= List of The Nature of Things episodes =

The Nature of Things (also, The Nature of Things with David Suzuki) is a Canadian television series of documentary programs. It debuted on CBC Television on November 6, 1960. Many of the programs document nature and the effect that humans have on it. The program "was one of the first mainstream programs to present scientific evidence on a number of environmental issues, including nuclear power and genetic engineering". The series is named after an epic poem by Roman philosopher Lucretius: "De rerum natura" – On the Nature of Things.

== Season 1: 1960–1961 ==
- Sundays at 5:30 pm
- Length 30 minutes

Title	Broadcast date	Episode
"Why Is It So"	November 6, 1960	1
Debut: National Research Council president Dr. E.W.R. Steacie, reminisces about the change in attitudes of science during the course of his career. In a clip from an upcoming show, Dr. Wilder Penfield of the Montreal Neurological Institute describes his work with the human brain. The host is Donald Ivey.
"The Roar of the Crowd"	November 13, 1960	2
Study of brain cells, how research has helped the understanding of learning and memory. Filmed at the Montreal Neurological Institute, with Dr. Wilder Penfield and Dr. Herbert Jasper.
"The Future of Science"	November 20, 1960	3
Professor Donald Ivey probes the attitudes and working habits of scientists.
"Schizophrenia"	November 27, 1960	4
"Engineering"	December 4, 1960	5
"Man as an Environment"	December 11, 1960	6
"Science Fiction"	December 18, 1960	7
"A special Christmas edition"	December 25, 1960	8
"The Aurora-Borealis"	January 1, 1961	9
"Man as an Environment – Human Body"	January 8, 1961	10
"Kept Alive"	January 15, 1961	11
"Physics and Games – Laws of Probability"	January 22, 1961	12
"The Face of the Moon"	January 29, 1961	13
"Hibernation"	February 5, 1961	14
"Man and His Environment"	February 12, 1961	15
"Eclipse"	February 19, 1961	16
"Animal Communication"	February 26, 1961	17
"The Speed of Light"	March 5, 1961	18
"Monotony"	March 12, 1961	19
Dr. John Zubec of the University of Manitoba explains his experiments and studies on boredom and its effects on the human mind.
"The Chemical Senses"	March 19, 1961	20
"The Mohole: Earth's Crust"	April 2, 1961	21
"Laws of Conservation"	April 16, 1961	22
"Photosynthesis"	April 23, 1961	23
"Physics of Clouds"	April 30, 1961	24
"The Sources of Science"	May 7, 1961	25

== Season 2: 1962 ==
- Thursdays at 8:00 pm
- Length 30 minutes

Title	Broadcast date	Episode
"Looking Ahead"	January 4, 1962	1
"Photography in Science"	January 11, 1962	2
"To Educate a Scientist"	January 18, 1962	3
"The Situation Is Fluid"	January 25, 1962	4
"Gallstones"	February 1, 1962	5
"The Upper Mantle Project"; alternate title: "Prisoners in the Penthouse"	February 8, 1962	6
Guest J. Tuzo Wilson, Professor of Physics, University of Toronto, and host Lister Sinclair look at a Canadian plan to survey the part of the Earth lying immediately under the crust to learn more about the Earth's formation, its landscapes and weather.
"The Physics of Music"	February 22, 1962	7
"Survival"	March 1, 1962	8
An appraisal of the probable effects of a large-scale nuclear blast over a North American city. Dr. Tom Stonier of the Rockefeller Institute of Government discusses what can be expected to happen to people and property as a result of such a blast.
"Man and the Moon"	March 8, 1962	9
"Hibernating Molecules"; alternate title: "A Prize for the Lowest"	March 15, 1962	10
Hosts Dr. Donald Ivey and Dr. Patterson Hume talk about conditions at extremely cold temperatures, when matter 'hibernates' and molecular action slows almost to a complete stop, and how this allows physicists to study the basic structure of matter.
"Monkey Curiosity"	March 29, 1962	11
"Spermatozoa"	April 5, 1962	12
Lord Rothschild of the University of Cambridge describes the results of his research in the field of spermatozoa.
"Animals With Feathers"	April 12, 1962	13
Dr. William Swinton, head of the Royal Ontario Museum's Life Sciences Department, and John Livingston, executive director of the National Audubon Society, trace the history of birds.
"Getting the Upper Hand"; alternate title: "Beetles and Bombs"	April 26, 1962	14
This program looks at failures and successes in attempts at Biological pest control. The stories include the spread of Dutch elm disease in Canada, and control of the screw-worm fly in Florida.
"Thinking about Math"; alternate title: "The Numbers Game"	May 3, 1962	15
Host Lister Sinclair discusses the thinking that goes into the science of mathematics. Using animated film and studio demonstrations, he explains Mathematical logic.
"The Plague"	May 10, 1962	16
"Instant Heat"	May 17, 1962	17
Co-hosted by Drs. Patterson Hume and Donald Ivey, of the University of Toronto. They show how electricity can be produced directly from heat, and vice versa, and discuss the difficulties of transforming thermal energy into electrical energy.
"A Science Newsreel"	May 24, 1962	18
"Learning"	June 7, 1962	19
"A Bang-Up Job"	June 21, 1962	20
"Out of Africa"	June 28, 1962	21
"Count on Me"	July 12, 1962	22
Computers are given the once-over by Drs. Donald Ivey and Patterson Hume.
"Blood in the Balance"	July 19, 1962	23
"Getting Us Typed"	July 26, 1962	24
Examines work of Dr. William Sheldon, who has spent 30 years gathering statistics about the human physique, classifying body types, and correlating this information to medical and psychiatric studies.

== Season 3: 1963 ==
- Sundays at 5:30 pm
- Length 30 minutes

Title	Broadcast date	Episode
"Looking Ahead"	January 6, 1963	1
Host Lister Sinclair explains how scientists approach their work and how The Nature of Things will present scientific items during its 26-week run.
"Brainwashing"	January 13, 1963	2
"Tubes to Transistors"	January 20, 1963	3
Hosts Dr. Patterson Hume and Dr. Donald Ivey of the University of Toronto talk about the electronics age brought about by the vacuum tube and the transistor.
"From Water to Land"; alternate title: "Lungs, Legs & Eggs"	January 27, 1963	4
The story of how vertebrates transitioned from water to land. Palaeontologist Dr. Alfred S. Romer of Harvard University explains the evolution of lungs, legs, and a new kind of egg found in aquatic creatures.
"Chemistry of Salt"	February 3, 1963	5
"Ear Operation"	February 10, 1963	6
"The Way the Ball Bounces"	February 17, 1963	7
Professors Donald Ivey and Patterson Hume demonstrate the principles behind the bounce in a rubber ball, and discuss elasticity by comparing rubber and steel.
"Lie Detectors"; alternate title: "I Kid You Not"	February 24, 1963	8
Host is Dr. John Rich, a psychiatrist with the University of Toronto and Queen's University. This program examines the autonomic nervous system, how it works, and what it can reveal.
"Smoking and Lung Cancer"	March 3, 1963	9
"Science Museums"	March 10, 1963	10
To commemorate the Canadian Centennial in 1967 it has been proposed that Canada build a national museum of science. The program includes filmed demonstrations of how science and technology can be made meaningful to the general public.
"Count on Me"	March 17, 1963	11
Drs. Patterson Hume and Donald Ivey of the University of Toronto explain the history and operation of what were once called calculating machines and are now known as computers. The program emphasizes how computers store information, produce it on demand, and use the offered information in the best possible way. (repeat from 07/12/1962)
"Tornadoes"	March 24, 1963	12
"The Descent of Man"	March 31, 1963	13
Recent fossil discoveries in Africa have shed new light on the ancestry and evolution of man. Guest Dr. L.S.B. Leakey, renowned British anthropologist and paleontologist, unearthed fossil remains in the Olduvai Gorge that have extended the time scale of human evolution from 500,000 to two million years or more. A deductive story in anthropology and paleontology is told as Dr. Leakey describes his finds and interprets their significance.
"Isaac Newton"; alternate title: "The Boy on the Seashore"	April 7, 1963	14
Series consultant Lister Sinclair pays tribute to Sir Isaac Newton. The program attempts to capture the spirit of the time through the words of Newton himself and those of his contemporaries.
"New Atoms for Old"	April 14, 1963	15
"Car Crashes"	April 21, 1963	16
"Bird Migration"	May 5, 1963	17
"Fact & Fiction"	May 12, 1963	18
"Code of Life"	May 19, 1963	19
"The Chemistry of Bread"; alternate title: "To Make A Long Story Short"	May 26, 1963	20
This program explores the chemistry of food and explains what properties food must have to fuel the body properly.
"The Infra-Red"; alternate title: "A Blush in the Dark"	June 2, 1963	21
Detection of heat waves by special infra-red receptors has many industrial, military, and other uses. Dr. Harry Pullen of the Radio Corporation of America research laboratories, Montreal, describes the properties of infra-red and demonstrates technological applications.
"Human Overpopulation"	June 9, 1963	22
Since the Industrial Revolution medical and other technological advances have offset natural controls, and the human species increased so rapidly that adequate future food supplies are in doubt. Sir Julian Huxley and Sir Charles Galton Darwin were interviewed about this aspect of human ecology.
"Mars"	June 16, 1963	23
"Spiders"	June 23, 1963	24
"Hypnosis"	June 30, 1963	25

== Season 4: 1964 ==
Title	Broadcast date	Episode
"Einstein, Man & Mathematician"	May 5, 1964	01
An examination of the personality and achievement of Albert Einstein. Dr. Jacob Bronowski of the Salk Institute for Biological Studies at La Jolla, California, one of the most distinguished and articulate interpreters of Einstein, shows the practicality and simplicity of Einstein's thinking. Einstein's ideas are demonstrated with the aid of models specially constructed for the show. Also includes film of Einstein's early days in Europe and a short film in which Einstein explains the relationship between matter and energy.
"About the Size of It"	May 12, 1964	02
"Standards for Comparison"	May 19, 1964	03
"Excursion Into Hell"	May 26, 1964	04
Centuries ago, people in warmer parts of the earth believed that a dread disease was contracted from unhealthy air generated in swamps. From this belief came the word "malaria," which means "bad air". The word is still used to describe a parasitic disease that remains one of the world's major public health problems. Efforts to find and isolate the causes of malaria make one of the greatest scientific detective stories of all time. Mosquitoes of the genus Anopheles were found to be implicated. But so far, their control is far from accomplished. Program features Dr. A. Murray Fallis, parasitologist with the Ontario Research Foundation and professor at the University of Toronto. Host is Lister Sinclair.
"Surgery for Parkinson's Disease"	June 2, 1964	05
"Science of Sports"	June 9, 1964	06
Athletic skills and physical capabilities can be precisely measured, so that there is truly a "science of sports". Host Lister Sinclair and Lloyd Percival, sports authority, observe athletes' capacities being tested in the studio and comment on films demonstrating techniques of various sports.
"Hypnosis"	June 16, 1964	repeat
Special guest Dr. Martin T. Orne of the psychiatry department at Harvard University Medical School discusses many aspects of hypnosis with series consultant Lister Sinclair.
"Lasers"	June 30, 1964	07
"Blood, Sea and Tears"	July 7, 1964	08
Dr. William Whitehead talks about the evolution of blood. The function of blood is an extension of the function of sea water in the simpler marine creatures. The salt water of prehistoric seas flows through all our bodies. In a sense, our blood is packaged sea water, and our tears, of course, are salty.
"Cartography"; alternate title: "The Vanishing Point"	July 14, 1964	09
Host and writer Lister Sinclair talks about map projection, and the problems of taking a spherical object, the earth, and representing it in two dimensional form. Many maps, both old and new, are used to show how the science of map-making has gradually developed. Sinclair also talks about projection, or perspective, in art.
"The World of Water"	July 21, 1964	10
"The Way the Ball Bounces"	July 28, 1964	repeat
"Immunology"	August 4, 1964	11

== Season 5: 1965 ==
- Sundays at 5:00 pm
- Length 30 minutes

Title	Broadcast date	Episode
"Good and Evil"	January 3, 1965	01
"Viruses"	January 10, 1965	02
"Survival"	January 17, 1965	03
The problem of survival in extreme climatic conditions is examined by Dr. William Whitehead.
"Eureka!"	January 24, 1965	04
Discussion and demonstration of "accidental" scientific discoveries.
"Flight"	January 31, 1965	05
Lister Sinclair looks at the artificial flight techniques of man and some of the principles of flying used by other species.
"The Quaking Earth"	February 7, 1965	06
"Pain"	February 21, 1965	07
"Lies, Damn Lies and Statistics"	February 28, 1965	08
Professors Patterson Hume and Donald Ivey dispute Mark Twain's claim that: "There are lies, damn lies and statistics"; or in other words, "you can prove anything with statistics."
"Einstein, Man & Mathematician"	March 7, 1965	repeat
Dr. Jacob Bronowski and Lister Sinclair examine the personality and the achievement of Albert Einstein, one of the greatest scientists in history. (repeat from 05/05/1964)
"Photography"	March 14, 1965	09
Dr. Walter Clark of the Eastman-Kodak Research Laboratory, and host Lester Sinclair explain what happens after you push the button of your camera.
"Bird Strikes on Aircraft"	March 21, 1965	10
At one time, collisions between aircraft and birds usually hurt only the birds. Now, with aircraft flying at supersonic speeds, the impact of collisions is greater. And birds ingested into the engines have caused a number of crashes. The Nature of Things looks at what is being done to eliminate bird strikes on aircraft.
"The Pacemakers"	March 28, 1965	11
For the first time ever on television, part of the remarkable "pacemaker" heart operation is shown being performed at the Toronto General Hospital.

== Season 6: 1965–1966 ==
Title	Broadcast date	Episode
"Animals and Man"	October 3, 1965	01
A series studying the animal kingdom, and man's place in it, through comparisons of anatomy, function, and behavior.
"Animals on Land"	October 10, 1965	02
How animals get from place to place, including burrowing, crawling, climbing trees, running, and jumping.
"Animals In The Water"	October 17, 1965	03
A study of fish, crocodiles, seals and whales.
"Animal Adaptation"	October 24, 1965	04
A look at how animals have developed special means of coping with the environments – the long neck of the giraffe, the coat of the polar bear.
"Animal Adaptation"	October 31, 1965	04
A look at the process of natural selection by which animals have developed special means of coping with their environments: the long neck of the giraffe, the coat of the polar bear, the digging claws of the mole.
"Animals and Food"	November 7, 1965	05
How animals locate, obtain, process and eat food using "anatomical tools": beaks, claws etc.
"Animals as Engineers"	November 14, 1965	06
Animals modify their environments in many ways: by building nests, damming streams, by breaking down forests.
"Animals as Engineers"	November 21, 1965	06
Program shows how animals modify their environments in many ways; by building nests, damming streams, and by breaking down forests.
"Animal Hands and Tools"	November 28, 1965	07
Man is known as the "toolmaker", although certain other animals do use tools.
"Animal Vision and Smell"	December 5, 1965	08
Different combinations of the senses are dominant in the activities of different animals: vision and smell in insects, smell and hearing in most mammals, vision and touch in the higher primates, including man.
"Animal Territory and Aggression"	December 12, 1965	09
A look at the various ways animals and man defend their homes and their young.
"Animal Social Behavior"	December 19, 1965	10
(Placeholder)
"(Placeholder)"	December 26, 1965	11
"Animal Learning"	January 2, 1966	12
How much of animal behavior is inherent, and how much is learned?
"(Placeholder)"	January 9, 1966	13
"(Placeholder)"	January 16, 1966	14
"Man and Animals"	January 23, 1966	15
Man, the animal species, as he might be described by an objective zoologist from another planet: what is he, his anatomy, his reproduction, his behavior and his ecology. A summary of the entire series.

== Season 7: 1966 ==
- Mondays at 7:30 pm
- Length 30 minutes

Title	Broadcast date	Episode
"The Sun"	June 20, 1966	1
The Sun and sun-worship through the ages.
"Natural History of the Niagara Gorge"; alternate title: "Natural History of Niagara"	June 27, 1966	2
"Air and Water Pollution"	July 4, 1966	3
"The Battle Against Biting Insects"; alternate title: "The Itch to Kill"	July 11, 1966	4
A look at some of the sophisticated methods of insect pest control: unbalancing the insects' nutrition, killing them by ultrasonic or other shock waves, sterilizing the males through ionizing radiation or light flashes; drowning the larvae in traps, or interfering with mating and egg-laying by light, colour or electricity.
"Air Conditioning – Natural and Man-Made"; alternate title: "Play It Cool"	July 18, 1966	5
"The Physics of Sailing"; alternate title: "The Science of Sailing"	July 25, 1966	6
"Epidemics"	August 1, 1966	7
"Summer Storms"	August 8, 1966	8
Meteorologists from McGill University explain the large-scale aspects of weather, with a focus on storms.
"Fishing and the Splake"	August 15, 1966	9
A program about fish, fishermen, and scientists. The splake is a cross breed fish between the speckled and the lake trout.
"The Value of our Parks"; alternate title: "Vanishing Wilderness"	August 22, 1966	10
"Forest and Fires"	August 29, 1966	11
"Galapagos: Darwin"	September 4, 1966	special
First episode of a five-part series on the Galapagos islands. This episode looks at the life and work of Charles Darwin, with emphasis on his historic five-year voyage as resident naturalist aboard the ship Beagle, his stopover at the Galapagos, and his lifetime spent evaluating the results of the trip.
"Water on the Level"	September 5, 1966	12
"Galapagos: The Islands"	September 11, 1966	special
"Galapagos: New Beings"	September 18, 1966	special
"Galapagos: Ways of Survival"	September 25, 1966	special
"Galapagos: Living Laboratory"	October 2, 1966	special
This final program in the series looks at some of the endangered species in the Galapagos islands, and at the impact of human settlement on the native creatures. The Galapagos are a living laboratory of incalculable value for the study of evolution.

== 1967 Canadian Wildlife Special ==
- Thursdays at 10:30 pm
- Length 30 minutes

Title	Broadcast date	Episode
"Canadian Wildlife: Retreat to the Rockies"	May 11, 1967	Special
"Retreat to the Rockies" with an especial look at bighorn sheep.
"Canadian Wildlife: A Celebration of Swans"	May 18, 1967	Special
A study of the rare and beautiful trumpeter swan, which was nearly extinct but has now returned to a reasonably healthy population of about 2,000 through efforts of federal and provincial conservation agencies.
"Canadian Wildlife: Arctic Summer"	May 25, 1967	Special
The authentic sights and sounds of wildlife activity in the Arctic during the summer. Animals seen include polar bears and seals.
"Canadian Wildlife: Wild Alberta"	June 1, 1967	Special
Wildlife in Alberta is the subject of tonight's episode. John Livingston narrates this final program in the special, four-part Centennial series about Canadian wildlife.

== Season 9: 1968–1969 ==
- Thursdays at 10:30 pm
- Length 30 minutes

Title	Broadcast date	Episode
"Thomas Edison"	September 26, 1968	1
First in a new series of 13 programs, "Machines and Man", focusing on the technological explosion and its impact on our fast-changing society. Thomas Edison wasn't merely a lone inventive genius; he also invented the modern research team that makes possible the technology shaping our world.
"Human Engineering"	October 3, 1968	2
The program ranges from heart operations to space flights.
"Materials"	October 10, 1968	3
A review of the history of man's oldest materials: wood, stone, iron, bronze and glass. An examination of modern materials and design.
"Structures"	November 7, 1968	4
A study of structures that defy gravity – Roman aqueducts; Milan's Gothic cathedral; and cantilever and suspension bridges.
"Communications"	November 14, 1968	5
Study of the problems of communications, with a look at the uses of speech, code, telegraph, TV, radio and laser.
"Canals and Tunnels"	November 21, 1968	6
The great engineers of the past – men like de Lesseps of Suez fame and Panama infamy, and Brindley whose canals were the arteries of the Industrial revolution, sacrificed the health and sometimes the lives of themselves and others, in order to build the first great canals and tunnels.
"Central Power"	November 28, 1968	7
Organization and harnessing of steam, water, nuclear energy, and tides. A look at the power failure that blacked out Eastern North America in November 1965.
"Man and Machines: The Greek Inventor"	December 5, 1968	8
A look at the development of the five basic mechanical devices: lever, wedge, wheel, pulley and screw, as defined by the Greek inventor, Alexander the Hero.
"Land and Water"	December 12, 1968	9
This program shows how man changes his environment by shaping the land he lives on, reclaiming lakes and rivers. The Netherlands is a prime example of what reclamation can accomplish, and the film shows some of the Dutch people's techniques and accomplishments.
"Man Aloft"	December 19, 1968	10
A study of old and modern flying machines.
"Portable Power"	December 26, 1968	11
From muscle power to nuclear reactors.
"Machines and Man: Transportation"	January 2, 1969	12
Are the problems of urban transportation insurmountable? This program examines the many cures being considered for the hardening of vehicular arteries: faster vehicles, mass transit methods, supersonic subways, bigger and better expressways, air transport, and better control and direction of traffic.
"Machines and Man: Systems Engineering"	January 9, 1969	13
Last in the 13-part series. A look at engineering in the systems of sailing ships and the U.S. space program.
"Audubon"	March 18, 1969	special
A study of the life and work of Jean Jacques Audubon, the great painter-naturalist who captured the beauty of American wildlife on canvas.

== Season 10: 1969–1970 ==
Title	Broadcast date	Episode
"Danger: Man At Work – In the Balance"	September 24, 1969	01
Part one of a six-part series on pollution. By means of film, interviews and comments by experts, the programs show how we are polluting soil, air and water; what is being done about the problem; and what our chances are for survival. With host John Livingston.
"Danger: Man At Work – The Urban Crisis"	October 1, 1969	02
The ways man has succeeded and failed in duplicating in his cities the checks and balances of the natural environment.
"Danger: Man At Work – Water"	October 8, 1969	03
The third program in this series about the problem of pollution. Narrator John Livingston shows how water is distributed throughout our environment, how it purifies itself, and how man has maltreated it.
"Danger: Man At Work – Air Pollution"	October 15, 1969	04
The thin layer of our atmosphere is renewed and kept in balance by two delicate cycles, dependent on living green plants. Pollution is destroying the green things which renew it.
"Danger: Man At Work – Pesticides"	October 22, 1969	05
This program investigates the long-term effects of pesticides such as DDT.
"Danger: Man At Work – The Global Crisis"	October 29, 1969	06
The final program in this series presents statements and observation of experts on the extent of pollution, what the future may be, and what can be done to stop pollution of the environment.
"The Ages of Man: A Day in the Life of a G.P."; alternate title: "The Family Doctor"	November 5, 1969	07
First of ten programs looking at Canada's achievements in medical research in the past decade. Cameras follow a young family physician (a general practitioner) through a busy day with patients at his office and at South Peel Hospital in Toronto. The film is also an examination of the direction medical training and health services are taking in Canada.
"The Ages of Man: A Breath of Life"	November 12, 1969	08
Program about genetic defects that can be inherited. Dr. D. N. Crozier of Toronto's Hospital for Sick Children is a guest.
"The Ages of Man: The Attack on Cancer"	November 26, 1969	09
This program centres on the exciting research into the effects of drugs on tumors in mice being conducted by the internationally renowned cancer research team at Toronto's Princess Margaret Hospital.
"The Ages of Man: Drugs"	December 10, 1969	10
A study of how medical researchers are using animals to determine the effect of drugs such as marijuana and LSD, and even liquor, on man.
"The Ages of Man: The Cell"	December 17, 1969	11
This program explains why it is essential to understand the complicated mechanism of the normal cell before we can really understand what happens when cancerous cells run out of control.
"The Ages of Man: Arthritis"	December 24, 1969	12
One quarter of all Canadians will be affected some time in their lives by arthritis. This program looks at a case of rheumatoid, the drug treatments available, and some of the therapeutic aids to assist a person suffering from the disease.
"The Ages of Man: Decade Science Review"; alternate title: "Science Decade"	December 31, 1969	13
This program is a brief review of the main achievements of science over the past ten years, and attempts to anticipate some of the advancements which may be expected in the seventies.
"The Ages of Man: Heart Disease"	January 7, 1970	14
A look at the coronary thrombosis which kills three out of ten adults; heart research in Canada.
"The Ages of Man: Transplants"	January 15, 1970	15
History and research in the field of organ transplants.
"The Ages of Man: A Definition of Death"	January 22, 1970	16
When is a man dead? Canadian physicians discuss the medical, ethical and legal questions involved with death, organ transplants and maintaining physical life after the death of the brain. (Last of the series).
"Wild Africa: As It Was"	February 25, 1970	special
The first of two programs depicting what remains of Africa's wildlife. This special features wild animals as they are protected and encouraged in Africa's national parks, including Queen Elizabeth National Park, Uganda, the Maasai Amboseli Game Reserve, Kenya, the Ngorongoro Crater Conservation Area and Tanzania's Serengeti National Park. Film segments include a female cheetah tracking down her antelope prey; never-before-filmed scenes of the Egyptian vulture using rocks to break open other birds' eggs; and the daytime routine of a lion family.
"A Sense of Time (Part 1)"	March 19, 1970	17
First in a three-part series visiting some of Canada's 700 museums in an attempt to show how people of all ages use them for self-discovery, a sense of communication with the past and a greater awareness of what has shaped today's world.
"Wild Africa: Something New"	March 25, 1970	special
Part two of a two-part special on Wild Africa. Today, wild Africa is in peril. Mushrooming human populations demand more and more of the ancient, easily violated landscape. Wild animals are on the retreat. Their last refuge is the magnificent system of national park and natural preserves. It is here that ecologists have established their field laboratories, to study the interrelationships of flora and fauna.
"A Sense of Time (Part 2)"	March 26, 1970	18
Second in a series of three programs on Canada's museums. This program presents views from adults – those who feel that the past has no relevance to their lives, and others who find themselves culturally enriched by the past. Includes a visit to the Royal Ontario Museum.
"A Sense of Time (Part 3)"	April 2, 1970	19
A look "backstage" at the Ontario Science Center, the Royal Ontario Museum and Old Fort Henry.
"Oceanography"	May 14, 1970	20
Recent advances in oceanography.
"Continental Drift"	May 21, 1970	21
The theory that the Earth's continents are moving is examined.
"Sense Substitution"	May 28, 1970	22
Research on new electronics and mechanical devices to help the blind and deaf realize true sensory perception.
"Physical Sciences: Stellar Evolution"	June 4, 1970	23
The latest observations of astronomers have turned up new kinds of stars; mysterious emanations from deep in space called pulsars and quasars.
"Physical Sciences: Making Waves"	June 11, 1970	24
Research into the physics of sound and hearing has caused increasing alarm among scientists and physicians about the effects of high noise levels upon people, and the destructive psychological and physical effects of constant noise pollution.
"Physical Sciences: Energy Conversion"	June 18, 1970	25
The physics of energy and the problem of producing large quantities of energy with little pollution form the basis of this program.
"Physical Sciences: Laser"	June 25, 1970	26
The qualities of laser and normal light are contrasted. Final program in the series.

== Season 11: 1970–1971 ==
Title	Broadcast date	Episode
"The Last Stand: Western Mountain Parks"	November 2, 1970	01
The first in a four-part series entitled The Last Stand. The series looks at a variety of areas in the world set aside as specially protected areas of wilderness and natural wildlife. The first program is about western mountain parks and the work being done by biologists and scientists to save mountain wildlife.
"The Last Stand: The Everglades of Florida"	November 9, 1970	02
The Everglades, unique in the world, are dependent entirely on water. But the beautiful birds and animals in the park are threatened by land development and a new airport, whose drainage policies are drying up the area.
"The Last Stand: Point Pelee"	November 16, 1970	03
The third in a four-part series entitled "The Last Stand." Point Pelee is a tiny peninsula in southwestern Ontario, jutting into Lake Erie, which contains a fresh water marsh full of wildlife of all kinds. It is also the last stronghold of the southern deciduous forest in Canada and contains southern species of plants and animals not found anywhere else in the country.
"The Last Stand: The Southwestern Desert"	November 23, 1970	04
The last in a four-part series entitled The Last Stand. This program looks at the Sonoran Desert in the U.S. Southwest and in Mexico. It contains an enormous variety of animal life and represents adaptation by both plant and animal life to a harsh environment where competition is keen and only the most successful can survive.
"A Sense of Time: The Age of the Universe"	December 7, 1970	05
The first in a three-part series entitled "A Sense of Time". This episode examines past and present ideas on the questions of how old is the universe.
"A Sense of Time: The Age of the Earth"	December 14, 1970	06
This program focuses on a new geophysical concept of our planet.
"A Sense of Time: The Age of Man"	December 21, 1970	07
Planet Earth has supported life for some three billion years; but Man, characterized by his powers of thought and other intelligent faculties, has shown the greatest development during his 500,000-years existence. Can he assume his role of responsibility to protect his life-giving biosphere?
"A Celebration of Swans"	December 28, 1970	repeat
Life cycle of a pair of rare trumpeter swans.
"A Breath of Life"	January 25, 1971	repeat
Every year, over 12,000 Canadians are born with serious inherited defects. This program focuses on treatment of one young victim of cystic fibrosis.
"The Great Lakes (Part I)"	February 1, 1971	08
Sociologists tell us that the Great Lakes are the basis for the civilization around them. If the lakes fail, so will we. The program explores the concept that we must cease to think of land and water as separate worlds, and instead treat them as a unity with an international plan for management.
"The Great Lakes (Conclusion)"	February 8, 1971	09
Immediate implementation of pollution control in our Great Lakes is urgently needed if we are to preserve our most vital waterway. But what are the implications of such action?
"Population Problems: Everybody's Baby (Part I)"	February 15, 1971	10
An exploration of the most difficult and serious issue threatening mankind today, the population crisis.
"Population Problems: Tomorrow's Child"	March 1, 1971	11
Featuring a national opinion poll on public attitudes in Canada towards population growth.
"The Living Arctic"	March 3, 1971	special
A two hour documentary on the Canadian North, its majestic wildlife and its increasing exploitation by man for natural resources.
"Psychiatry: Who Help Themselves"	March 15, 1971	12
Dealing with the McGill University Settlement Mental Health Unit project in Montreal.
"Psychiatry: Heavy Night"	March 22, 1971	13
Second in a series on the development and potential of psychiatry for the masses, focusing on informal youth clinics established in a low-income area of Montreal.
"Psychiatry: Street Fighting Mad"	March 29, 1971	14
A visit to Montreal's Allan Memorial Institute, where a disturbed teenager responds to treatment.
"Psychiatry: Human Potential"	April 5, 1971	15
A look at Vancouver-area encounter groups.

== Season 12: 1971–1972 ==
Title	Broadcast date	Episode
"Banting, Best and Insulin"	October 4, 1971	01
Season opener: The Nature of Things looks at the discovery of insulin by Dr. Frederick Banting and Dr. Charles Best and deals with the current Canadian research into diabetes.
"Cancer in Canada"	October 11, 1971	02
Chances of recovery by a cancer patient in Canada are examined. Guests: Dr. James Till, Toronto's Princess Margaret Hospital, and Dr. Robert Taylor of the National Cancer Institute.
"Population: Everybody's Baby"	October 18, 1971	repeat
A visual exploration of the most difficult and serious issue threatening mankind today: the population crisis.
"Parkinsonism"	October 25, 1971	03
A look at research which may bring hope to sufferers of a crippling disorder that affects those on the older side of the generation gap. Guests include Dr. Oleh Hornykiewicz, a pioneer in the discovery of the drug L-DOPA.
"The Rocky Mountains"	November 1, 1971	repeat
The beautiful, vast tracts of land in the western mountain parks of the west coast and the Rocky Mountains are gradually being destroyed by camp sites, roads and towns. As they are opened their animal life gradually disappears.
"The Last Stand: The Everglades of Florida"	November 15, 1971	repeat
An almost unique wildlife reserve is threatened by land developments and drainage policies.
"The Last Stand: Point Pelee"	November 22, 1971	repeat
Visit to Canada's last stronghold of the southern deciduous forest, a freshwater haven teeming with wildlife. But will it last?
"The Living Arctic"	November 29, 1971	repeat
The Nature of Things presents the first part of its highly acclaimed White Paper special on the vast Arctic regions of Canada.
"The Last Stand: The Southwestern Desert"	December 6, 1971	repeat
Last in a four-part series visits the U.S. Sonoran Desert, a prime example of plant and animal adaptation to a dry, harsh environment, where competition is keen and only the hardiest survive.
"The Fur Trade"; alternate title: "The Skin Trade"	December 13, 1971	04
A look at the endangered species of animals used in the fur trade, focusing on the Canadian market.
"Population: Everybody's Baby"	December 20, 1971	repeat
Overpopulation and how it developed.
"The Harp Seal"; alternate title: "The Ice Lovers"	January 3, 1972	05
The life history of the seal, currently the object of the great spring seal hunt; the physiology and behavior of this unusual Arctic animal, plus an examination of its 8,000-mile migration from Hudson Strait to the Gulf of St. Lawrence and back. Also a look at the seal's unique adaptation for deep diving, currently under study by biologists at the University of Guelph in Ontario.
"Grouse Country"	January 10, 1972	06
The world of the colorful bird family admired by hunters and birdwatchers alike.
"The Polar Bear"	January 17, 1972	07
Pictorial life history of the Arctic animals throughout the seasons.
"Lobsters and the Sea"	January 24, 1972	08
A glimpse into the world of an unusual and amusing ocean inhabitant.
"Vanishing Peoples: Yanomami"	January 31, 1972	09
Documentary look at the Yanomami, a fast-vanishing Indian tribe inhabiting the tropical rainforest of the Upper Orinoco River in southeastern Venezuela and Northern Brazil.
"Insulin (repeat from 10/04/1971)"	April 24, 1972	repeat
"Cancer in Canada"	May 1, 1972	repeat
Canada is recognized as a world leader in cancer research, with its pioneer work in radiation therapy, the cobalt bomb and chemotherapy. Tonight's program examines the chances for recovery a cancer patient now has in Canada.
"Parkinson's Disease"	May 8, 1972	repeat
Medical science does not yet know the exact causes of this disease but modern research into this crippling incapacitator of the middle-aged has resulted in improved treatment. This program offers a look at the disease and the treatment, with surgery and drugs, notably L-Dopa, giving many sufferers new hope.
"The Blue Holes of Andros"	May 15, 1972	10
A visit to a deep network of underwater caves found offshore from the island of Andros, with Dr. George Benjamin, a Canadian research chemist and the world's foremost authority on the Bahamas' "blue holes" (underwater caves).

== Season 13: 1972–1973 ==
Title	Broadcast date	Episode
"Vanishing Peoples: Lacandons, The Mayas of Mexico"	November 6, 1972	01
Season opener: The Lacandons, the last surviving descendants of the Mayas, live in the rain forest of southern Mexico and cling to ancient beliefs and traditions. Narration is by Mia Anderson and the voice of Chan K'in is by Chief Dan George.
"The Sexes, part 1 of 2"	November 20, 1972	02
Examines male and female roles in society and presents a scientific study of the known biological facts about sex differences in humans.
"The Sexes, part 2 of 2"	November 27, 1972	03
This program looks at hormonal changes during puberty, and the socially originated attitudes leading to differences between the sexes.
"Acupuncture"	December 4, 1972	04
An exploration of the traditional art of healing as practiced in China.
"The Polar Bear"	January 8, 1973	repeat
The first in a four-part series on Canadian wildlife looks at the polar bear. A pictorial "life history" seen through the seasons; also, the problems of Churchill, Manitoba, a booming town right in the path of a polar bear migration route.
"Grouse Country"	January 15, 1973	repeat
Mating rituals of the rock and willow ptarmigan; the blue, ruffed and spruce grouse and the greater prairie chicken; from the offshore islands of Newfoundland to the Alberta foothills.
"Lobsters and the Sea"	January 22, 1973	repeat
A fascinating glimpse into the world of the lobster; an unusual, amusing inhabitant of our oceans and seas.
"Ice Lovers"	January 29, 1973	repeat
A life history of the harp seal, examining the behavior and physiology of this unique Arctic mammal; plus a look at its unusual 800-mile migration each year from Hudson Strait to the Gulf of St. Lawrence.
"The Blue Holes of Andros"	February 13, 1973	repeat
An underwater tour of the mysterious world of the Andros Islands, in the Bahamas, where immense underwater caves have recently been discovered.
"Think Before You Eat"	March 5, 1973	05
A look at the eating habits of Canadians; food and nutrition, the so-called "Well-balanced diet" and problems of overeating are analyzed in this examination of the dangers of abundance.
"Stockholm '72: Politics For Survival"	March 12, 1973	06
A retrospective look at the summer 1972 World Conference on the Human Environment.
"Cities for People"	March 19, 1973	07
The Nature of Things presents Cities Are For People, originally scheduled for February 19. It deals with new thinking in urban planning to make cities more livable.
"Migration: Animals in Cycle"	March 26, 1973	08
A look at the migratory habits of birds and animals, with recent findings in animal studies reinforced with fascinating film footage of many species in their natural habitats.
"Old Enough"	April 2, 1973	09
This half-hour film depicts obvious absurdities, in a subjective interpretation of The Limits to Growth, a 1970 MIT computer study forecasting economic, social and political collapse by no later than 2020.
"Recycling: The Garbage Ouroboros"	April 9, 1973	10
A comprehensive examination of the form of pollution fast becoming public enemy number one in North America: garbage.
"Acupuncture"	April 16, 1973	repeat
This ancient and traditional art of healing has been widely practised in China for more than 5,000 years. Its recent rebirth as a successful treatment for many diseases, notably asthma, ulcers, hepatitis, depression, and some forms of deafness and paraplegia, are explored in this program.
"Vanishing Peoples: Yanomami"	May 7, 1973	repeat
A documentary on the Yanomami of South America, known as The Fierce People, a fast-vanishing tribe in the isolated, tropical rain-forest of the Upper Orinoco River in Venezuela and Brazil.

== Season 14: 1973–1974 ==
- Mondays at 10:00 pm
- Length 30 minutes

Title	Broadcast date	Episode
"Puffins, Predators and Pirates"	November 26, 1973	01
Season Premier: A biological study which reveals the plight of one of the world's last puffin colonies on Great Island off the eastern coast of Newfoundland.
"The Club of Rome"	December 3, 1973	02
Our world is littered with the ruins of civilizations which have collapsed. A group of thinkers called The Club of Rome, thinks that we may be on the verge of chaos – social and political unrest, pollution, food and energy shortages – which could eventually reduce our civilization to ruins. The group is trying to find answers which will prevent our society from ruining itself.
"Ellesmere Land"	December 10, 1973	03
Summer comes to the Fosheim Peninsula of Ellesmere Island in Canada's vast high Arctic: giant furry musk oxen, jaegers cruising the valley skies, fox eating the eggs of a black bellied plover, droves of Arctic hares.
"Anybody's Child"	December 17, 1973	04
Michael is one of four youngsters living in a house. Each child suffers from severe emotional disturbances or mental illness, and in some cases, had been written off by society as untreatable. As an alternative to institutional treatment they are being brought up in a warm family environment by two young child care workers.
"Grouse Country"	December 24, 1973	repeat
A look at grouse, one of the most plentiful birds in Canada; highly conspicuous, colorful and greatly admired by hunters and birdwatchers alike.
"Vanishing Peoples: Lacandons"	December 31, 1973	repeat
This special focuses on the Lacandons, direct descendants of the great Mayan civilizations. Isolated from modern society, the Lacandons have been able to preserve the Mayan philosophies which help them solve the problems of survival and fulfillment in the jungle.
"A Comet's Tale"	January 7, 1974	05
Czech astronomer Dr. Luboš Kohoutek, discoverer of the current heavenly phenomenon Comet Kohoutek 1973 f, is among the participants in this full-hour special. Roy Bonisteel is host of the program which examines comets from a scientific viewpoint, and heavenly signs and portents of doom from psychological and historical perspectives.
"The First Inch"	January 14, 1974	06
What goes on in the very top layer of soil is often too small to see with the naked eye. When photographed under a microscope, that first inch of soil reveals itself to be one of the most vital of the life cycles affecting man. The tiny, invisible hordes of bacteria, plant eaters, parasites and predators are the subject of this program.
"The Serious Business of Play"	January 21, 1974	07
Play is nature's method of learning about environment and about life for the young. This episode explores our world of play and its importance for survival.
"Out of the Mouths of Babes"	January 28, 1974	08
Little children learn languages, especially their own, with astonishing ease. Why this is so is the subject of this film.
"The Joy of Effort"	February 4, 1974	09
How the laws of physics are being applied to athletic endeavors, and coaches being taught how to use science rather than just "common sense" to help athletes get the most out of their bodies.
"The Cree of Paint Hills"	March 24, 1974	special
A special documentary of the Cree inhabitants of Paint Hills, on the eastern shore of James Bay in Quebec.
"James Bay"	March 28, 1974	special
A 200-mile voyage up the La Grande River, on the east coast of James Bay, showing the Indian settlement at Fort George.

== Season 15: 1974 ==
Title	Broadcast date	Episode
"The Mendi"	October 8, 1974	Special
It was not until 1930 that the outside world knew that there were people living in the highlands of Papua, New Guinea. In 1950 the first contact was made with a group of 55,000 Mendi, part of a million inhabitants of the New Guinea highlands, formerly not known to exist. The Australians have since built an airstrip, a hospital, schools, a hotel and other permanent buildings there, but the Mendi have kept their culture intact. A CBC film crew directed by Nancy Archibald has recorded some of the ancient culture and lifestyle of the Mendi and the results are presented in this special one-hour documentary.
"And God Created Great Whales"	October 9, 1974	01
A documentary showing the behaviour of killer whales in the wild, in the waters off Vancouver Island.
"Children's Hospital"	October 23, 1974	02
Story of a child's stay in Toronto's Hospital for Sick Children.
"The Heimaey Eruption: Iceland 1973"	October 30, 1974	03
A film on the volcanic eruption off the south coast of Iceland in 1973.
"Traveller From An Antique Land"	November 6, 1974	04
A scientific autopsy is carried out on an Egyptian mummy.
"Puffins, Predators and Pirates"	November 13, 1974	repeat
Documentary about the plight of puffins in Newfoundland.
"Mind and Hand"	November 20, 1974	05
What happens when a person makes a voluntary movement? Some say the human behavior is involuntary and is based on past experience. The whole question is explored on The Nature of Things.
"Ellesmere Land"	November 27, 1974	repeat
A documentary about summertime life on Fosheim Peninsula in Canada's Arctic.
"Frogs, Snakes and Turtles"	December 4, 1974	06
Frogs, snakes and turtles play vital roles as janitors and regulators of the environment.
"Discovery on Charlton Island"	December 11, 1974	07
An archeological party discovers evidence that an old Hudson's Bay site at the foot of James Bay had been burned down by the French in the 17th century.
"The First Inch"	December 18, 1974	repeat
What goes on in the very top layer of the Earth's soil is often too small to see with the naked eye. When photographed under a microscope, that first inch of soil reveals itself to be one of the most vital of the life cycles affecting man.

== Season 16: 1975 ==
Title	Broadcast date	Episode
"Out of the Mouths of Babes (Part 1 of 2)"	October 22, 1975	01
Season Debut: A two-part film about the ease in which little children learn languages.
"Ears to Hear"	October 29, 1975	02
Severely deaf children learn to speak like normal children with the aid of powerfully sensitive hearing aids and teaching techniques being used by dedicated teachers.
"Sable Island"	November 5, 1975	03
A look at Sable Island, about 100 miles off Nova Scotia, where the wildlife has had an unusual evolution because it is separated from the mainland.
"Water's Edge (Part 1)"	November 12, 1975	04
Unique life forms in a pond.
"Water's Edge (Part 2)"	November 19, 1975	05
Visible and microscopic life at the edge of a pond.
"Prairie Grasslands"	November 26, 1975	06
Documentary on prairie dogs and one colony in particular in South Dakota.
"The Heimaey Eruption"	December 3, 1975	repeat
A film on the volcanic eruption off the south coast of Iceland in 1973.
"The Arctic Islands: A Matter of Time"	December 7, 1975	special
An hour-long special capturing the beauty of the varied wildlife of the Arctic and pointing out the slim thread of natural features that determines wildlife survival.
"The Differences Are Inherited"	December 10, 1975	07
The fruit fly is used as the focus for a discussion of mutations, current genetic research and the relationship of this research to some of the problems suffered by humans.
"Shelter: A Question of Control"	December 17, 1975	08
The program shows how psychological experiments support those who believe that community and citizen control over their own environment is essential to the well being of city dwellers.
"And God Created Great Whales"	December 24, 1975	repeat
A half-hour documentary showing the behavior patterns of killer whales.

== Season 17: 1976–1977 ==
- Wednesdays at 8:00 pm
- Length 30 minutes

Title	Broadcast date	Episode
"Noah's Park"	December 22, 1976	01
Season Debut: The story of an attempt to restore the landscape and wildlife of a section of Israel's Negev desert to their state in biblical times.
"The Invisible Reef"	December 29, 1976	02
Through the use of micro-photography, viewers are afforded a look at the unique way in which a reef is formed through a complex system of natural recycling.
"Newborn"	January 5, 1977	03
A study of the capabilities that are innate to a newborn baby in the first week after birth.
"The Mind's Eye"	January 12, 1977	04
A look at the work of scientists who are exploring regions of the brain by examining its relationship to the visual system.
"Children of the Buffalo"	January 19, 1977	05
A study of the Todos tribe of India, their polyandrous marriage rituals and their unusual funeral rites. The Todos spend their lives tending the buffalo and everything they do revolves around this animal.
"The Gabra"	January 23, 1977	special
The Gabra is a tribe of 24,000 people who live in the harsh terrain on both sides of the Kenya-Ethiopia border. They may be the only non-Muslim, camel raising society left in the world. Their lifestyle is cruel, filled with age-old rituals and beliefs.
"The Last of Life"	January 26, 1977	06
A look into geriatric medicine and some aspects of research into the biology of aging.
"Sable Island"	February 2, 1977	repeat
The program focuses on a small island about 100 miles off Nova Scotia, where herds of wild horses live. Because they have been separated from the mainland for so long, the horses of Sable Island are considered a sub-species. The island is the breeding ground of the Ipswich sparrow and the birthplace of the rare grey seal.
"When The Wind Blows"	February 9, 1977	07
A look at the uses man has made of the wind, from sailboats to windmills to modern turbines for generating electricity.
"Funk Island"; alternate title: "The Funks"	February 16, 1977	08
Shows some of the species of seabirds to be found on Funk Island, situated 40 miles east of Newfoundland, which is a breeding ground of more than one million seabirds, and stresses the need for their protection against man.

== Season 18: 1977–1978 ==
Title	Broadcast date	Episode
"The People You Never See"	December 14, 1977	01
The Nature of Things begins its 18th season with a study of people afflicted with cerebral palsy, showing how some cope with their disability.
"The Evolution of Flight"	December 21, 1977	02
"The Geese of Wascana"	December 28, 1977	03
Visit to the marshes of Regina where Canada geese spend the winter on open water.
"Radiation: In Sickness and in Health"	January 4, 1978	04
"Radiation Part II: Nuclear Power"	January 11, 1978	05
A look at the advantages and dangers of nuclear energy, focusing special attention on the problem of waste disposal.
"The Cry of the Gull"	January 18, 1978	06
The Cry of the Gull examines the effect of chemical pollutants on Lake Ontario wildlife.
"Space Shuttle"	January 25, 1978	07
A look at the next development in space research: establishing a space colony supporting 10,000 people in an Earth-like environment.
"Twins: And Then There Were Two"	February 1, 1978	08
This is the first of a two-part report which looks at both the scientific and human side of twins. The possibility of telepathy between twins is discussed.
"Twins: Matching Genes"	February 8, 1978	09
Part two of a two-part study of twins and the research being conducted. This program shows how scientists use the phenomenon of twins to discover more about mankind in general, particularly in the field of genetics.
"When Men Play Gods"	February 22, 1978	10
The creation of new organisms using a technique called recombinant DNA.
"The Geese of Wascana"	March 1, 1978	repeat
A look at the Canada geese of Regina's Wascana Park.
"Patterns of Pain / The Gannets of Bonaventure"	March 8, 1978	11
Two films featured: Patterns of Pain explores the perception of pain in our nervous systems; The Gannets of Bonaventure looks at the largest breeding colony of gannets in North America, on Bonaventure Island; and informs of threats to the colony from pollution and tourist traffic.

== Season 19: 1978–1979 ==
Title	Broadcast date	Episode
"Roger Tory Peterson: Portrait of a Birdwatcher"	September 11, 1978	special
Roger Tory Peterson revolutionized the science of ornithology by devising a system of bird identification based on his observation that each bird displays a unique set of markings. This profile follows the artist-naturalist into the fields and marshes of North America and Antarctica as he leads tours and displays some of the photographic techniques he uses for his field guides.
"Evolution Update"	September 24, 1978	01
Season premiere: Anthropologist Richard Leakey discusses his work in Africa, and explains the latest techniques by which scientists measure time and age of subjects.
"Clockwork Atom"	October 1, 1978	02
The phenomenon of man's changing concepts of the world is explored in relation to his desire to measure time more accurately.
"This Will Do For Today"	October 8, 1978	03
A series of people of varying ages, professions and experiences express their innermost feelings on subjects ranging from dateless Saturday nights to fear of death.
"Island of Monkeys"	October 15, 1978	04
A study of individual development and group dynamics in a troop of rhesus monkeys in the natural observable environment of Cayo Santiago near Puerto Rico.
"The Dogon"	October 29, 1978	05
The cliff-dwelling Dogon farmers and their unique culture are studied in their homeland near the Niger River in Mali.
"Toward The Sun"	November 5, 1978	06
The current efforts in both the United States and Canada to harness the sun as a major resource of heat and power are examined.
"Portrait Of A Market: Sololá"	November 12, 1978	07
The activities of the economic and social center of Sololá, located on Lake Atitlán in Guatemala, are viewed.
"Sleep (part 1 of 2)"	November 26, 1978	08
Volunteers undergo an experiment at the Montefiore Sleep Lab in New York which monitors their sleeping-awakening cycles in an attempt to learn more about the body's biological time system.
"Dreams (part 2 of 2)"	December 3, 1978	09
Analysis of dreams is viewed at several institutions established expressly for that purpose, and those who participate in the experiments are shown as they make notations and give recollections of what they dreamed.
"Charlie"	December 17, 1978	10
Canadian paleontologist Charlie Sternberg and his work in cataloguing dinosaur fossils in the Albertan Badlands are profiled.
"The Search"	December 24, 1978	11
The Search follows World Health Organization medical teams on their campaign to vaccinate the against smallpox in Somalia, the world's last location where the disease survives.
"The Cajuns"	December 31, 1978	12
The descendants of Nova Scotia's Acadians and their lifestyle are profiled at their adopted home, the Bayou Lafourche in southern Louisiana.
"Coming and Going"	February 7, 1979	special
New ways of dealing with the terminally ill are examined in Coming and Going, a sensitive treatment of a serious problem. With the help of relatives and hospital staff, patients come to terms with their illness.

== Season 20: 1979–1980 ==
Title	Broadcast date	Episode
"Flying Circus of Physics / Immune System / Monarch Butterfly / Contact Lenses"	October 24, 1979	01
Season Premiere: Dr. David Suzuki visits an unusual professor who conducts a Flying Circus of Physics, reports on the latest immunological efforts to treat severely afflicted children, looks at the life cycle of the monarch butterfly and the many hazards it faces, and examines soft contact lenses made for extended periods of use.
"Hypnosis / India's Sacred Cows / Ultra Sound Scanner"	October 31, 1979	02
Dr. David Suzuki reports on the use of hypnosis as a medical application and the use of ultra-sound waves for X-rays, and presents the film "Sacred Cows," dealing with the importance of domestic cattle to the Indian economy.
"Madagascar: Island of the Moon"	November 7, 1979	03
The island geographically separated from the rest of the African continent and populated by numerous species of plant and animal life is examined.
"Puppets / One, Two, Three, Zero / New Wave Babies"	November 14, 1979	04
In Puppets, Elizabeth Crocker at the Izaak Walton Killam Hospital for Children, Halifax, is interviewed about her use of puppets to ease children into their hospital stay. The One, Two, Three, Zero segment examines possible methods of treatment for infertile couples who wish to have children. In New Wave Babies, scientists Dr. Patrick Steptoe and Dr. David Bevie are interviewed about methods used in the "test tube baby" procedure.
"Contact"	November 21, 1979	05
The techniques for helping autistic children developed by Barry and Suzi Kaufman to aid their own son are examined, as are their applications in a special program being conducted by a York University graduate.
"Deep Diving / Memory: Come to Think of It"	November 28, 1979	06
David Suzuki goes deep-sea diving to demonstrate the psychological changes divers experience. David also investigates the mysteries of memory – how it is acquired, and how it is lost.
"Arctic Oil"	December 5, 1979	07
North America's last great wilderness area, Lancaster Sound in Canada's high Arctic, is now the site of oil exploration, and a unique environment rich in animal and plant life is threatened. David Suzuki and a film crew from The Nature of Things visited Lancaster Sound to find out what the future holds for this region. The material gathered from that expedition, together with interviews with several of the native peoples and with others directly concerned with what is happening in the Canadian Arctic, are presented in this program.
"Clinical Trials / Folk Medicine / Magnetic Bacteria"	December 12, 1979	08
Clinical trials, folk medicine and magnetic bacteria are discussed by Dr. David Suzuki.
"Left Brain, Right Brain"	December 19, 1979	09
The latest techniques used in the field of neurosciences are researched to determine the functions of both halves of the human brain.
"Insects / Oyster Culture / Science Fairs"	December 26, 1979	10
The survival of insects over thousands of years, the cultivation of oysters in West Africa, and Canadian science fairs on the provincial and national levels are examined by Dr. David Suzuki.
"Memories From Eden"	January 2, 1980	11
Special environments which zoo officials have created for the welfare of certain animals and the enjoyment of visitors are highlighted.
"The Mendi"	January 9, 1980	repeat
A Stone Age tribe which left 50,000 members living off the land in Papua, New Guinea is examined.
"The Cree of Paint Hills"	January 16, 1980	repeat
A feature on the Cree Indians of the eastern James Bay region and the threats of modern society to their lifestyle. This is a last minute change from Paul Jacobs and the Nuclear Gang, the feature originally scheduled to appear at this time.
"The Lacandons"	January 23, 1980	repeat
A vanishing tribe of North American Indians in Mexico which is living according to the religious rites of past centuries is profiled.
"Paul Jacobs and the Nuclear Gang"	February 6, 1980	12
For more than twenty years a freelance American journalist named Paul Jacobs interviewed people exposed to nuclear fall-out from bomb tests in Nevada in an attempt to establish a link between such exposure and cancer. In this episode Jacobs' investigations are examined.
"Roger Tory Peterson: Portrait of a Birdwatcher"	February 13, 1980	repeat
The work of Peterson and his intense love of nature are examined in this documentary which shows him at work in his studio and at his Connecticut home.
"Crocodile City / Spanish Galleons / World's Largest Windmill / Cement"	February 20, 1980	13
This magazine edition includes four segments: a look at Lamanai (Crocodile City), built by the Maya of Belize between 400 and 300 BC, as it was being excavated by David Pendergast of the Royal Ontario Museum, assisted by other specialists and a work-force of direct descendants of the Maya; Spanish Galleons: A look at the recent discovery and exploration of Spanish treasure ships wrecked off the coast of Texas four centuries ago, and techniques used in identifying encrusted objects; World's Largest Windmill: Students and teachers of a Danish Folk School have built a windmill 75 meters high that produces 2,000 kilowatts of electricity, and Cement: A look at the properties of cement.
"High altitude Physiology / The Vision of Galileo / Dust Storms"	February 27, 1980	14
Technological developments involving man's survival at high altitudes; a look at the life of Galileo, Italian astronomer, mathematician and physicist, including recreation of some of his experiments; and an examination of the global meteorological effects of Sahara dust storms.
"Seal Psychology / Chiricahuas / Violins"	March 5, 1980	15
Seal Psychology: A study of the ability of seals to navigate and catch fish in waters where it is too dark for the seals to see. Chiricahuas: A look at the Chiricahua mountains and their wildlife in southeast Arizona. Violins: How violins are made, including an interview with a violin maker, and footage of students at the International School of Lute Making in Cremona, Italy.

== Season 21: 1980–1981 ==
- Wednesdays at 8:00 pm
- Length 1 hour

Title	Broadcast date	Episode
"Volcanoes / Hovercraft / Curve Balls / Windshear / Xerography"	October 8, 1980	01
Season Premiere: Volcanoes: A look at the geological formation and environmental impact of volcanoes, focusing on the 1980 eruptions of Mt. St. Helens in Washington. Hovercraft: New uses for air-cushioned vehicles, including the possible future use of hovercraft over muskeg terrain. Curve Balls: A demonstration of how baseball pitchers throw curve balls, and the effects which a baseball has when it spins through the air. Windshear: Richard Malcolm, a physicist specializing in aircraft safety, discusses the problems created by different types of turbulence and the recent aircraft design changes to ameliorate the problems. Xerography: A presentation of how a photocopier works.
"Cystic Fibrosis / Whooping Crane / Cold-Water Survival"	October 15, 1980	02
A report on cystic fibrosis, a genetic respiratory ailment that afflicts young people; the International Crane Foundation's work to save endangered species of birds is documented; and hypothermia, which involves the impact of very cold water on the human body, is examined.
"Skin – The Bare Necessity / Manatees / Ludhiana"	October 22, 1980	03
Three films are featured: Skin – The Bare Necessity, dealing with the human skin; Manatees, concerning a unique vegetarian creature which lives in coastal waters, and Ludhiana, a profile of an Indian city which serves as the home base for 12,000 different business enterprises.
"Tar Wars"	October 29, 1980	04
The geology and relative impact of the Athabasca Tar Sands are examined, along with the problems involved in the extraction of oil from the deeper deposits.
"Going Without Gas / Surface Tension / Science Fair"	November 5, 1980	05
Going Without Gas: A look at recent developments in designing cars that run on fuels other than petroleum, such as methanol, ethanol, electricity, hydrocarbons and hydrogen. Surface Tension: Observing the molecular properties of surface tension and how soap uses these properties to remove grease. Science Fair: A look at the 1979 Metropolitan Toronto Science Fair, featuring the contestants (ages 12-18), the displays, the judging and the awards presentation.
"China Now – Its Roots in the Past (Part 1 of 2)"	November 12, 1980	06
The lifestyle and culture of modern China are highlighted in a study of the educational system and medical techniques of the country; visits to the seaport of Qingdao and the ancient cities of Hangzhou and Yangzhou are featured.
"China Now – The Four Modernizations (Part 2 of 2)"	November 19, 1980	07
The professional and recreational activities of the Chinese people are examined in a tour of their homes, factories and parks, as well as the palaces which were formerly the homes of emperors.
"Success Story / Sickle Cell Anemia"	November 26, 1980	08
A magazine edition: Success Story: a film by nature photographer John Carey about the insect world and the ability of insects to survive hostile forces of man and nature. Sickle Cell Anemia: A look at what is known about the causes of sickle cell anemia, how it affects its victims and what progress is being made to alleviate and cure the condition.
"Freak Waves / Invisible Astronomy / Hildebrand"	December 3, 1980	09
Freak Waves: A report on work at the Canadian National Research Council into wave formations that can engulf oil rigs or large vessels, even when weather conditions are relatively fair. Invisible Astronomy: Host David Suzuki visits the Algonquin Park Observatory and the Arecibo Observatory in Puerto Rico as he reports on the use of radio astronomy and the search for extraterrestrial intelligent life. Hildebrand: A visit with chemist and educator Joel Hildebrand of the University of California.
"Prenatal Diagnosis / Hearing in Chinchillas"	December 10, 1980	10
Prenatal Diagnosis: Presents new techniques to examine the fetus while still in the womb to determine its sex and detect possible defects. Hearing in Chinchillas: A look at the similarities between the human ear and the ear of a chinchilla, and a study of how noise can permanently damage hearing in both. Chinchillas are subjected to loud tones and their inner ear membranes are examined for damage in an electron microscope.
"Hypnosis / India's Sacred Cows / Ultra Sound Scanner"	December 31, 1980	repeat
"AAAS Report / One of the Family / Oyster Culture"	January 7, 1981	11
AAAS Report: Scientists gathering in Toronto for a meeting of the American Association for the Advancement of Science are interviewed about the role of the scientific community in the nuclear arms race. One of the Family: A Toronto family whose youngest member was born with cerebral palsy is profiled, focusing on their reactions to his birth and his development with the help of doctors and therapists. Oyster Culture: A look at a Japanese oyster harvesting operation and at oyster farms in Sierra Leone, West Africa, and Sabah, Malaysia.
"Birds' Eggs / Newfoundland Oil / John Polanyi"	January 14, 1981	12
Birds' Eggs: A look at the many ways that egg shells protect and aid embryonic development of birds. Newfoundland Oil: The technical difficulties and possible environmental and social impact of oil drilling off the coast of Newfoundland are examined. John Polanyi: An interview with the University of Toronto molecular scientist who discusses his work, his influences, the responsibilities of a scientist and the centrality of science in the modern world.
"Poisoned Playgrounds / Charlie"	January 28, 1981	13
The actions taken by Ontario parents when insecticide spraying at a school proved hazardous to their children's health are examined, and in a repeat showing of the film "Charlie", the work of Canadian paleontologist Charlie Sternberg is highlighted.
"High Altitude Physiology / The Vision of Galileo / Dust Storms"	February 4, 1981	repeat
The effects of high altitudes on man's physiology, the vision of Galileo, and the causes and results of dust storms are examined.
"The Moving Still"	February 11, 1981	14
A look at the history of scientific photography from its beginnings in 1837 to the present-day use of high-speed cameras.
"Sri Lanka: Island of Serendib"	February 18, 1981	15
A documentary on Sri Lanka, its wildlife and culture and the changes taking place as technological development erodes traditional ways of life.
"Seal Psychology / Chiricahuas / Violins"	February 25, 1981	repeat
Seal psychology, the Chiricahua mountains, and the making of violins are among the topics covered.
"Tar Wars"	March 4, 1981	repeat
The geology and relative impact of the Athabasca Tar Sands are examined, along with the problems involved in the extraction of oil from the deeper deposits.
"Blackfly / Desalination / Memory – Come to think of it / Dr. Karl Illmensee"	March 11, 1981	16
Blackfly: A look at the life cycle of the blackfly, and its effects in northern Canada and Africa. Desalination: A practical method of desalination using reverse osmosis is presented. Memory – Come to think of it (repeat): A look at recent research into the brain's memory capacities. Dr. Karl Illmensee: A look at the work being done by Dr. Karl Illmensee at the University of Geneva to study the possibility of causing cancerous cells to revert to normal cells.
"The Foxes' Earth"	March 25, 1981	17
For centuries the people of the village of Huasicancha in Peru lived under the domination of others, from the last of the Inca rulers to the Spanish conquerors and subsequent regimes. How the people finally rose up to reclaim the poor land they farmed at a subsistence level is told in this documentary.
"The Last of Life / The Cajuns"	April 1, 1981	repeat
The Last of Life: A look at geriatric medicine and some aspects of research into the biology of aging. The Cajuns: The descendants of Nova Scotia's Acadians and their lifestyle are profiled at their adopted home, the Bayou Lafourche in southern Louisiana.

== Season 22: 1981–1982 ==
- Wednesdays at 8:00 pm
- Length 1 hour

Title	Broadcast date	Episode
"Reconnective Surgery / Shark Vision / Reclaiming the Desert / The Battery"	October 14, 1981	01
Season Premiere: David Suzuki examines reconnective surgery and the vision capabilities of sharks, visits an irrigation project in India and explains the functions of batteries. The micro-surgery segment was taped in China and features Dr. Chen Chung Wei of the 6th People's Hospital in Shanghai. Dr. Chen is credited with pioneering the techniques now being practiced at Toronto's General hospital.
"Rabies / Island of Coral / Microwave Ovens"	October 21, 1981	02
Steps being taken to combat rabies in Ontario, an Island of Coral which provides a home for some of the world's most unique creatures, and the advantages and hazards of microwave ovens.
"Edge of the Cold (Part 1 of 2)"	October 28, 1981	03
David Parer's Australian examination of the wildlife on Macquarie Island, narrated by Sir Edmund Hillary. The Australian Broadcasting Corporation produced four half-hour films about the Macquarie Islands. This episode of The Nature of Things compiles two of them. The other two episodes are broadcast in "Edge of the Cold part 2" on 8 December 1982.
"Waterproof Frog / The Piano / In the Sub-Nuclear Kitchen / The Record"	November 4, 1981	04
Waterproof Frog: A look at the unique frog Phyllomedusa which lives in the arid Gran Chaco region of central South America. The frog protects itself against water loss by coating its body with a waxy secretion. The Piano: A program about the history and science of the piano. In the Sub-Nuclear Kitchen: A brief look at particle physics and the huge particle accelerator at the European Organization for Nuclear Research (CERN) in Geneva. The Record: A history of the phonograph record.
"A Magic Way of Going"	November 11, 1981	05
A study of the genetic and biological development of thoroughbred horses, tracing the history of the animal from the time that horses were small creatures to the sleek, larger size animals they are today.
"Twins – And Then There Were Two"	November 18, 1981	06
This is a special edition based on two half hour programs that first aired in 1978. Producer Heather Cook has revised and updated the original programs to include the latest research data in studies that have been continuing over long periods at various medical centres and universities in North America. The program explains how cells divide to produce twins and the differences between fraternal twins and identical twins.
"A Natural Turn of Events / Kidney Transplant / Kelp"	December 9, 1981	07
A Natural Turn of Events: Construction in Toronto has led to the creation of a long spit of land – the Leslie Street Spit – which is turning into a prime nesting location for many kinds of birds, and also for migrating monarch butterflies. Kidney Transplant: Kidney dialysis and transplants, with Dr. Michael Robinette of the Toronto General Hospital. Kelp: A look at kelp harvesting in China, and the products that can be made from it.
"Microscope: Making It Big / Desert Doctors / Polar Bear Pass"	January 6, 1982	08
Microscope: Making It Big: A look at the history and present development of the microscope. Desert Doctors: A look at the mobile hospitals used to treat people inexpensively in India's Rajisthan Desert. Polar Bear Pass: A look at Polar Bear Pass, an important oasis of arctic wildlife on Canada's Bathurst Island.
"Tipping The Scales"	January 13, 1982	09
The various factors which influence human weight are examined through reports on eating habits, diets, and basic metabolism. Rescheduled from 12/02/1981.
"An Island Shall a Monster Make / Philip Morrison on Nuclear War"	January 20, 1982	10
A magazine edition highlights the giant lizards on the island of Mona near Puerto Rico, and physics professor Philip Morrison's work on the atomic bomb as a team member on the Manhattan Project.
"Aspirin / Windy Bay / Fluorescent Light"	January 27, 1982	11
Aspirin: An examination of how the common drug aspirin may have widespread application in combating heart and circulatory system diseases. This depends on its action, only recently appreciated, of inhibiting blood clotting. Windy Bay: A look at Windy Bay, on Lyell Island in the Queen Charlotte Islands, one of the last areas of virgin rainforest on the Canadian west coast. Windy Bay is now threatened by clearcut logging even though it has been suggested as a priority site for international conservation. Fluorescent Light: How fluorescent lights work and how they are manufactured.
"Hanuman Langurs: Monkeys of India / A Helping Hand / Formation Flight"	February 3, 1982	12
Hanuman Langurs: Monkeys of India: A look at the social organization and adaptation to human settlements of Hanuman langurs, social monkeys who are named for the monkey god Hanuman. A Helping Hand: A look at myoelectric prostheses, artificial limbs which, while being powered by batteries, are actually controlled by amplified muscle electricity. Formation Flight: Examining the reasons why large birds tend to fly in formation.
"Jute Plastic / The Life of the Honeybee / Dr. Joel Hildebrand"	February 24, 1982	13
Jute Plastic: The harvesting and processing of Bangladesh's jute fibre. Jute sheets coated with polyester resin and laminated together form a strong cheap material which may win an international market for jute. The Life of the Honeybee: A documentary following the life cycle of the honey bee and the social organization of the hive. Dr. Joel Hildebrand: David Suzuki travels to the University of California at Berkeley to attend the celebration of the 100th birthday of Dr. Joel Hildebrand, who is active in science after teaching chemistry for many years.
"Mind's Eye / Tide Mill / Colour It Snake"	March 10, 1982	14
Mind's Eye: A report on recent research into how the brain constructs vision from the information supplied by the eyes. Tide Mill: A look at a grist mill at Ealing in England which for two centuries has run on tidal power. Colour It Snake: A discussion of the ways in which the basic pigments in snake scales are arranged to produce colour patterns fitting various survival needs.
"The Asteroid and the Dinosaur"	March 24, 1982	15
An examination of the theory advanced by physicist Luis Alvarez and others that an asteroid impact was responsible for the sudden total extinction of the dinosaurs over sixty million years ago.
"Waves / The Harp Seal / Blackfly"	March 31, 1982	16
Waves: An update of the program "Freak Waves" originally broadcast in December 1980. A further look at research being done into wave formations that can destroy oil rigs on the open sea. The Harp Seal (repeat): The development of the harp seal is traced, from birth through nursing to its eventual migration northward. Blackfly (repeat): A look at disease and other problems caused by blackflies.

== Season 23: 1982–1983 ==
- Wednesdays at 8:00 pm
- Length 1 hour

Title	Broadcast date	Episode
"Gutenberg Revisited / Diving Birds / Tulips"	October 20, 1982	01
Season Premier: Gutenberg Revisited: A look at new developments in microelectronic information processing, focusing on the Telidon system, a Canadian invention offering two-way interactive television. Diving Birds: A look at adaptations in aquatic birds such as ducks and geese which allow them to make long dives under water. Tulips: An overview of the tulip industry in Holland.
"Northern Games / Geothermal Energy / Ships of the Desert / Coriolis Effect"	October 27, 1982	02
Northern Games: A look at the traditional games of the Inuit as they are practised 800 km north of the Arctic Circle, by youth in competition from communities across the North. Geothermal Energy: A look at how geothermal energy has been adapted to supply human needs on Iceland. Ships of the Desert: An exploration of the dromedary camel, adapted for life in the desert. Coriolis Effect: A brief explanation of the coriolis effect – what it is, how it is demonstrable, and its effect on weather.
"Bring Back My Bonnie"	November 3, 1982	03
A look at recovery after strokes. In previous years, strokes were frequently fatal, and brain damage was seen as permanent. Now, all this is changing. It has been found that with therapy many stroke victims can recover some or even most of the functions they have lost.
"Long Point"	November 10, 1982	04
Long point marsh is a sandspit on the northern shore of Lake Erie. Discovered in 1670 by French explorers, this wildlife area has kept many of its original features and is now an important habitat for many species of animals and migrating birds.
"Living in a Sunhouse / Brittle Bones / DIAL"	November 17, 1982	05
Featured: Solar techniques to improve the thermal efficiency of a house; treatment methods for fragile bones (osteoporosis); and a laser system called DIAL (Differential Absorption Lidar) that measures levels of environmental pollution.
"The Superachievers (Japan part 1 of 2)"	November 24, 1982	06
The landmarks of Japanese science and technology since the end of World War II are highlighted in the first of two related programs. The ancient craft of Samurai swordmaking and computer based steel production are also examined.
"The Nation Family (Japan part 2 of 2)"	December 1, 1982	07
The everyday life of Japanese workers is traced through their values, their leisure activities and the mechanization of their factories.
"Edge of the Cold (Part 2 of 2)"	December 8, 1982	08
The Australian Broadcasting Corporation produced four half-hour films about the Macquarie Islands. This episode of The Nature of Things compiles two of them. The first was originally entitled 'Man the Hunter, Man the Keeper.' The second was originally entitled 'The Dominant Male.' The program looks at the delicate ecological balance which must be maintained for the populations of elephant seals and seabirds on the Macquarie Islands. Narrated by Sir Edmund Hillary. The other two episodes were compiled into a Nature of Things broadcast of 28 October 1981.
"Tipping the Scales"	December 15, 1982	repeat
The various factors which influence human weight are examined through reports on eating habits, diets, and basic metabolism.
"To Be or Not to Be"	December 22, 1982	09
Numerous questions raised by new genetic testing techniques designed to identify fetal disorders are addressed. The evolving techniques of fetal diagnosis such as amniocentesis, ultrasound and fetoscopy are also considered. This is a revised version of 'Prenatal Diagnosis' which was originally broadcast on December 10, 1980.
"The Fragile Mountain"	December 29, 1982	10
An examination of the measures being taken by a Himalayan mountain community that is trying to avoid a flood disaster, such as that which devastated northern India in 1978.
"Newborn"	January 12, 1983	repeat
A look at the first moments of an infant's life and its adaptation to the outside world.
"Decade of Delay / RH Laboratory / Hawaii Telescope"	January 19, 1983	11
Decade of Delay: A look at what can be done to make cars safer, and an inquiry into why it is not being done. RH Laboratory: A visit to the special Rh. laboratory in Winnipeg, which was the world pioneer in combating Rh disease, an infant condition that results from the presence or absence of the rhesus factor in individual blood cells. Hawaii Telescope: A look at the telescope and observatory erected by a joint venture of Canada and France on Mauna Kea volcano in Hawaii.
"Water: Friend or Foe?"	January 26, 1983	12
Holland's Delta Project, a task involving difficult measures to reclaim land from the sea, is detailed.
"The Gentle Giants / Ancient Diseases / Water Weeds"	February 2, 1983	13
The Gentle Giants: A film on the gray whales who live off the pacific coast of North America. Ancient Diseases: A look at paleopathology and what can be learned about the past of man and the history of diseases through the autopsy of ancient human remains. Water Weeds: A look at an experimental project in Listowel, Ontario, using cattails to purify sewage. The cattails thrive in sewage where they also filter out some industrial contaminants as well as deal with organic compounds.
"Hanuman Langurs: Monkeys of India / A Helping Hand / Formation Flight"	February 9, 1983	repeat
Hanuman Langurs: Monkeys of India: A look at the social organization and adaptation to human settlements of Hanuman langurs, social monkeys who are named for the monkey god Hanuman. A Helping Hand: A look at myoelectric prostheses, artificial limbs which, while being powered by batteries, are actually controlled by amplified muscle electricity. Formation Flight: Examining the reasons why large birds tend to fly in formation.
"Jute Plastic / The Life of the Honeybee / Dr. Joel Hildebrand"	February 16, 1983	repeat
The harvesting and processing of Bangladesh's jute fiber, the life cycle of a honeybee colony, and the work of Berkeley professor Dr. Joel Hildebrand are highlighted.
"An Island Shall a Monster Make / Philip Morrison on Nuclear War"	February 23, 1983	repeat
A magazine edition highlights the giant lizards on the island of Mona near Puerto Rico, physics professor Philip Morrison's work on the atomic bomb as a team member on the Manhattan Project, and water in its frozen state.
"Magnet Earth"	March 2, 1983	14
A one-hour film from the BBC series Horizon exploring the effects of the Earth's magnetic field on animals and, to a lesser extent, humans.
"Waterproof Frog / The Piano / In the Sub-Nuclear Kitchen / The Record"	March 9, 1983	repeat
Waterproof Frog: A look at the unique frog Phyllomedusa which lives in the arid Gran Chaco region of central South America. The frog protects itself against water loss by coating its body with a waxy secretion. The Piano: A program about the history and science of the piano. In the Sub-Nuclear Kitchen: A brief look at particle physics and the huge particle accelerator at the European Centre for Nuclear Research (CERN) in Geneva. The Record: A history of the phonograph record.
"Sri Lanka, Temple of the Elephant"; alternate title: "Sri Lanka: Island of Serendib"	March 16, 1983	repeat
The island paradise of Sri Lanka is visited in a comprehensive study that examines the dangers its wildlife faces from cultural and technological changes.
"On The Track of the Wild Otter"	March 30, 1983	15
The social life of one of nature's shyest creatures is examined in a year-round study of its behavior.

== Season 24: 1983–1984 ==
- Wednesdays at 8:00 pm
- Length 1 hour

Title	Broadcast date	Episode
"Swimming / Diabetes: Beating the Needle / Glass Eyes"	October 5, 1983	01
Season Premiere: Dr. David Suzuki profiles veteran Canadian swimmer Dan Thompson, the lifestyles of diabetics and the manufacturing of glass eyes.
"Cobra: India's Good Snake / Blue Babies / High Flight"	October 12, 1983	02
Cobra: India's Good Snake: Ignorance and superstition surround the cobra, threatening the members of this species which is helpful to man. Blue Babies: David Suzuki talks with cardiologist Peter Olley of the Hospital for Sick Children in Toronto concerning the pharmaceutical and medical treatment of infants born with a congenital heart defect. High Flight: Research is beginning to uncover the reasons why birds can fly at high altitudes that would cause brain damage in humans.
"Animal Imposters"	October 19, 1983	03
The clever methods of various creatures either to hunt or to avoid being hunted are examined in locations including Central America and Australia.
"Spas: Magic or Medicine?"	October 26, 1983	04
England, Japan, France and Toronto are among the locations for a study of treatments at spas for health conditions.
"The Cathedral Engineers / Neem: A Natural Insecticide / Bluebird Trails"	November 2, 1983	05
The Cathedral Engineers: Shot on location in France and New York City, the program looks at the history and philosophy of European gothic cathedrals. Neem: A Natural Insecticide: Products of the neem, one of the world's most useful trees, are used to make everything from soap to insecticide. Bluebird Trails: Pushed out of prime nesting sites by the introduction of the English sparrow and starling in 1900, the North American bluebird is making a comeback thanks to specially constructed bluebird boxes built across eastern North America.
"Salmon on the Line"	November 9, 1983	06
This hour-long program documents the reasons for the decline of some species of pacific salmon. The life cycles, spawning, and migration of various types of pacific salmon are studied.
"Bishnois and the Antelope / Cyclosporin / Freezing Water"	November 16, 1983	07
Bishnois and the Antelope: a Hindu sect known as the Bishnois live on the edge of the Rajasthan desert in northwestern India. Strict vegetarians, they have an awareness of ecology which makes them protectors of their environment. Cyclosporin: A new anti-rejection drug cyclosporin is being used to treat transplant patients. Freezing Water: A look at what happens when water is frozen.
"Footsteps on the Moon / Salamanders / Iron Age Village"	November 23, 1983	08
The moon's role in man's history, the anatomy of salamanders, and the discovery of an iron-age village are highlighted.
"A Natural Turn of Events / Kidney Transplant / Kelp"	November 30, 1983	repeat
A Natural Turn of Events: Construction in Toronto has led to the creation of a long spit of land – the Leslie Street Spit – which is turning into a prime nesting location for many kinds of birds, and also for migrating monarch butterflies. Kidney Transplant: Kidney dialysis and transplants, with Dr. Michael Robinette of the Toronto General Hospital. Kelp: A look at kelp harvesting in China, and the products that can be made from it.
"Snappers / Inside Out / Samurai Armour"	December 7, 1983	09
Featured: the snapping turtle is profiled; a look at technology which enables doctors to examine the interior of the body without surgical intervention, and a visit to a Japanese craftsman's workshop where Samurai armour is made.
"Flight Simulators / Beating The Blues"	December 21, 1983	10
A visit to a Montreal company that produces sophisticated devices to train air pilots, and a report on the effects of severe depression and methods of treatment.
"Making it Big / Tulips / Diving Birds"	December 28, 1983	repeat
This episode looks at the invention of the microscope, a report on Holland's tulip industry, and diving birds.
"Maps: From Quill to Computer / Mountain Gophers / Japanese Silk Weaving"	January 4, 1984	11
Maps: From Quill to Computer: The history of mapmaking, from early clay tablets to state-of-the-art renditions. Mountain Gophers: a look at the Columbian ground squirrel found in the area of the Rocky Mountains, their mating and territorial habits and methods of communication with each other. Japanese Silk Weaving: A look at the production of silk, from cocoon to fabric.
"A Magic Way of Going"	January 11, 1984	repeat
The genetic and biological development of thoroughbred horses is traced in a program filmed in Canada, the United Kingdom, Ireland, Maryland and Kentucky.
"The Superachievers (Japan part 1 of 2)"	January 18, 1984	repeat
The landmarks of Japanese science and technology since the end of World War II are highlighted in the first of two related programs. The ancient craft of Samurai swordmaking and computer based steel production are also examined.
"The Nation Family (Japan part 2 of 2)"	January 25, 1984	repeat
The everyday life of Japanese workers is traced through their values, their leisure activities and the mechanization of their factories.
"Long Point Marsh"	February 1, 1984	repeat
An examination of the 32-kilometer-long sandspit on the north shore of Lake Erie, which serves as home base for numerous small creatures and is now under the jurisdiction of the Canadian Wildlife Service.
"Bring Back My Bonnie"	February 8, 1984	repeat
This documentary details the treatment and rehabilitation of stroke victims at Sunnybrook and Riverdale Hospitals, the Toronto Rehabilitation Centre and the homes of several victims struggling to recover.
"Decade of Delay / RH Laboratory / Hawaii Telescope"	February 15, 1984	repeat
Decade of Delay: A look at what can be done to make cars safer, and an inquiry into why it is not being done. RH Laboratory: A visit to the special Rh. laboratory in Winnipeg, which was the world pioneer in combating Rh disease, an infant condition that results from the presence or absence of the rhesus factor in individual blood cells. Hawaii Telescope: A look at the telescope and observatory erected by a joint venture of Canada and France on Mauna Kea volcano in Hawaii.
"The Gentle Giants / Ancient Diseases / Water Weeds"	February 22, 1984	repeat
A magazine edition features a West German film about gray whales, a profile of scientists studying million-year-old human remains, and an experiment involving sewage treatment in Listowel, Ontario.
"Water: Friend or Foe?"	February 29, 1984	repeat
Holland's Delta Project, a task involving difficult measures to reclaim land from the sea, is detailed.
"Edge of the Cold"	March 7, 1984	repeat
David Parer's Australian examination of the wildlife on Macquarie Island, narrated by Sir Edmund Hillary.

== Season 25: 1984–1985 ==
- Wednesdays at 8:00 pm
- Length 1 hour

Title	Broadcast date	Episode
"Pain in the Back / Mobile Computers / The Birdmappers: Bird Atlas"	October 10, 1984	01
Season Premiere: Treating chronic back pain; mobile data terminals for emergency personnel; and individuals tracking birds in Ontario and observing their behaviour so that a bird atlas can be published.
"Kunde Hospital / Computer Choreology / Periscope Camera"	October 17, 1984	02
A visit to Kunde Hospital, built in a remote Himalayan village by New Zealand explorer Sir Edmund Hillary; a look at the use of computers for dance notation which record a dancer's movement; and a camera that can perform complex film tracking shots through miniature sets.
"Prairie Waters"	October 24, 1984	03
An exploration of Manitoba's Delta Marsh and its animal, bird and plant life.
"The Miracle of Life"	October 31, 1984	04
Host David Suzuki presents film footage of the reproductive process of mitosis, the first division of an egg that initiates the process of reproducing life. The story follows the development of the human fetus from conception until it enters the outside world.
"Chinese Wall Paintings / Erie Ice / Fly Fishing"	November 7, 1984	05
Chinese Wall Paintings: Observing the detailed and time-consuming work involved in restoring two large 14th-century wall paintings owned by the Royal Ontario Museum. Erie Ice: A look at the formation of ice ridges that can force themselves down into the lake bottom, carving huge gouges when they shift. Fly Fishing: A look at the sport of fly fishing, examining the life cycle of the brook trout and the mayfly and showing how detailed knowledge of the river ecosystem is necessary for successful angling.
"Sexual Encounters of the Floral Kind"	November 14, 1984	06
A look at how various species of plant life lure insects and animals to effect the pollination process.
"Drought in Africa / Where the Bay Becomes the Sea / Insect Communication"	November 28, 1984	07
Drought in Africa: A brief look at the drought conditions in Ethiopia and the need for solutions at the village level. Where the Bay Becomes the Sea: A documentary about the fragile and complex marine ecosystem in the Bay of Fundy. The film traces relationships within the food chain – from tiny plankton to birds and seals and finally to whales and humans. Insect Communication: A look at the hearing and sound-producing mechanisms of insects, used for attracting a mate, defining territory, and defending against bats.
"Making Moves / Orchids / Juggling"	December 12, 1984	08
Making Moves: Research into the technological advances that allow victims of spinal cord injuries to regain motor skills. Orchids: A look at some of the varieties of wild orchids and Canadian orchids, and interviews with orchid experts. Juggling: Examining the science of juggling, including some impressive demonstrations of juggling.
"Salmon on the Line"	December 19, 1984	repeat
David Suzuki takes a look at how the once-plentiful Pacific salmon is now threatened with extinction.
"Voices in the Wind"	December 26, 1984	09
A historical look at the evolution of the pipe organ.
"Dinosaurs: Remains to be Seen"	January 9, 1985	10
The program looks at the work of various experts in the fields of paleontology, geology, biology, and art as they study the evidence and history of dinosaurs and their environment.
"CPR: Reversing Sudden Death / Catching the Wind / Environmental Sculpture"	January 16, 1985	11
CPR: Reversing Sudden Death: a British Columbia campaign to teach cardiopulmonary resuscitation to the general population. Catching the Wind: An examination of the skill and scientific expertise required for world-class sailing. Environmental Sculpture: In his studio in Oakville, sculptor Joseph Patriska creates art which urges government and industry to commit to a cleaner environment.
"The Great Lakes: Troubled Waters"	January 23, 1985	12
David Suzuki takes a look at the potential hazards of pollution and mismanagement of one of the world's greatest sources of fresh water – the Great Lakes.
"A Planet for the Taking Overview / Blue Babies / High Flight"	January 30, 1985	13
Preview of the new series, A Planet for the Taking; pharmaceutical and medical treatment of infants born with a congenital heart defect; and the anatomy of the bird's lung and the biochemistry of its brain that makes high flight possible.

== Season 26: 1985–1986 ==
- Wednesdays at 8:00 pm
- Length 1 hour

Title	Broadcast date	Episode
"My Goal Is To Live / The Return of the Sea Otter"	October 9, 1985	01
Season Premiere: Another visit with cystic fibrosis victim Susan McKellar, and the return of the sea otter.
"Air Craft"	October 16, 1985	02
A look at the machines designed to enable man to fly, from the Wright Brothers to today's revolutionary designs.
"Muscle Fibre / How Fish Swim"	October 23, 1985	03
Muscle Fibre: An examination of the mechanics of muscle contraction, looking at the roles of slow and fast types of muscle fibres. How Fish Swim: An examination of the biomechanics of fish locomotion, looking at the physical differences between different types of fish.
"Open Heart"	October 30, 1985	04
A profile of pioneering heart surgeon Dr. William Bigelow, focusing on the development of early heart surgery procedures.
"Plant Communication / Jaipur Foot"	November 6, 1985	05
Plant Communication: A look at the chemical defence mechanisms of plants and how they are triggered. Jaipur Foot: An artificial foot designed to fit in with rural India's environment and culture.
"Doctors of Tomorrow / Walking / The Vortex"	November 13, 1985	06
Doctors of Tomorrow: A unconventional form of medical education at McMaster University, in a program of self-directed learning, with no classes, lectures, or exams. Walking: An examination of the continual pendulum-like exchange of potential and kinetic energy that makes walking the most efficient form of human locomotion. The Vortex: A description of how whirlpools are formed and the consequences of this primary pattern of movement on the surrounding environment.
"Dinosaurs: Remains to be Seen"	November 20, 1985	repeat
Evidence from fossilized footprints, bones and pollen are used to create a facsimile of the world of the dinosaur.
"Ducks in Danger"	November 27, 1985	07
David Suzuki investigates how the duck population is being threatened by toxic water, poor hunting regulations and blocked legislation.
"The New Face of Leprosy"	December 4, 1985	08
A progress report on leprosy includes programs designed to educate people in recognizing early symptoms of this disease that still afflicts people worldwide.
"How Alcohol Affects the Body / Ancient Life-forms / The Physics of Archery"	December 11, 1985	??
"Islands at the Edge"	January 29, 1986	??
The wilderness refuge of British Columbia's Queen Charlotte Islands is threatened by logging operations intent on harvesting the Sitka spruce.
"Microscopic Plants and Oxygen"	February 26, 1986	??
"Acid Rains"	March 12, 1986	??

== Season 27: 1986–1987 ==
Title	Broadcast date	Episode
"Season Premier"	October 8, 1986	01
David Suzuki is the host of this award-winning science show which begins its 27th season. What will the car of the future be like? Faster? Sleeker? Will it be built by humans – or machines? Will it continue to pollute and kill? Join David Suzuki for an eye-opening ride through the fact and fantasy of the machine we love. And hate.
"Restless Sky; Rotation; Handcraft in History"	October 15, 1986	02
Clouds, and the atmospheric forces that create weather; an illustration of the principle of rotation; traditional methods and modern techniques employed in making paper in Nepal.
"The Niagara Escarpment: A Rock Video"	October 22, 1986	03
A look at the dangerous and beautiful Niagara Escarpment, a limestone spine that runs northward from Niagara Falls through the densely populated province of Ontario.
"(Placeholder)"	October 29, 1986	04
Bereaved Argentinian women whose persistence and courage have enlisted help from American geneticists and forensic scientists in identifying the victims of their former government's persecution; ultrasonic sound and kidney stones; ambitious curbside recycling programs.
"(Placeholder)"	November 5, 1986	05
A look at the therapeutic use of plants over the years to cure illnesses and maintain good health, and how the deteriorating number of plant species in the world may prove to be a medical, as well as environmental, loss to humanity.
"(Placeholder)"	November 12, 1986	06
A look at how some animals, including the snapping shrimp and possibly the whale, use sound waves to stun their prey.
"Women of Kerala / Vortex"	November 26, 1986	07
Describes a program in Kerala, a state in southern India, where a combination of contraception, voluntary sterilization, increased education, a lowered rate of infant mortality, and the extension of health care to impoverished rural areas has produced a dramatic decrease in the birth rate. Also, scientific and technical research focused on the vortex.
"Air Craft"	December 3, 1986	repeat
A look at flying machines, from the Wright Brothers to today's revolutionary designs.
"The Familiar Face of Love"	December 10, 1986	08
An exploration into the psychological and social forces which form our ideas and feelings about the opposite sex.
"Caribou Drowning in Labrador / Teflon Knee Ligaments"	December 17, 1986	09
An investigation into the drowning of 10,000 caribou in Limestone Falls, Labrador, in 1984, and a knee operation using a newly developed artificial ligament made of flexible Teflon.
"(Placeholder)"	January 7, 1987	10
The language behind the gestures of a symphony conductor; and Canada's oldest residential environment education program, the Toronto Island Public and Nature Science School.
"(Placeholder)"	January 14, 1987	11
A visit to a classroom where an innovative approach is taken in teaching math, and children are encouraged to invent their own math problems to solve by creating games and puzzles.
"(Placeholder)"	February 4, 1987	12
The chemistry of fire; and a look at two species of cormorants noted for their fishing abilities.
"(Placeholder)"	February 18, 1987	13
A simple solution of sugar, salt and water is saving millions of children's lives in Third World countries from diarrhea and subsequent dehydration, which causes more deaths than famine.
"(Placeholder)"	March 11, 1987	14
This journey into the human immune system focuses on various aspects of the AIDS virus, from its origin in history to the psycho-social impact on its victims and society.

== Season 28: 1987–1988 ==
Title	Broadcast date	Episode
"(Placeholder)"	October 7, 1987	repeat
Season premiere: David Suzuki reports on the origins and history of AIDS as well as the psycho-social impact on its victims.
"Home of the Birds"	October 14, 1987	01
Declining populations of seabirds on the Gulf of St. Lawrence.
"(Placeholder)"	October 21, 1987	02
Modern uses of radar, and the philosophy and science of dowsing for water.
"The Anatomy of Eloquence / Fossils in shale"	October 28, 1987	03
The physiology of speech production, and fossils in shale.
"(Placeholder)"	November 4, 1987	04
Los Angeles County's toxic waste strike force, and how fish swim.
"(Placeholder)"	November 11, 1987	repeat
Caribou migration patterns, and teflon knees.
"(Placeholder)"	November 18, 1987	05
The fate of the Franklin expedition through the Arctic.
"Nuclear Power: The Hot Debate"	November 25, 1987	06
The long-term effects of fall-out from Chernobyl are still being debated. The pros and cons of nuclear power have been hotly debated for the past decade, but the shock waves of the accidents at Three Mile Island and Chernobyl have brought that debate to a boil. This episode looks at that debate. How safe are reactors and waste disposal? What about uranium mining, weapons proliferation, and the economics? How safe is nuclear energy and what are the alternatives?
"(Placeholder)"	December 2, 1987	07
A year in the life of a bald eagle, and history of balloons and airships.
"Serving Time / Arctic wildlife"	December 16, 1987	08
Zoos as a refuge for endangered species, and the wildlife of the Arctic.
"The Living Arctic"	December 23, 1987	repeat
Wildlife in the Arctic.
"Spas: Magic Or Medicine"	December 30, 1987	repeat

== Season 29: 1988–1989 ==
Title	Broadcast date	Episode
"The Knowing Nose"	October 5, 1988	01
29th Season Premiere: An exploration of the sense of smell in both animals and humans.
"Trouble In The Forest"	October 12, 1988	02
An examination of forest dieback considers the possible effects of air pollution and acid rain.
"(Placeholder)"	October 19, 1988	repeat
Imaging radar produces three-dimensional pictures of Earth's biosphere, and the philosophy and science of dowsing for water.
"(Placeholder)"	October 26, 1988	03
Multicelled human organisms evolve from matter created 14.5 billion years before.
"(Placeholder)"	November 2, 1988	04
Analyzing facial musculature, and a Hindu hospital for birds.
"(Placeholder)"	November 9, 1988	05
A Jamaican bat cave; gardening and ecological principles.
"The USSR – The Changing of the Guard"	November 16, 1988	repeat
Science and technology restructure society.
"Blowpipes and Bulldozers"	January 11, 1989	06
Swiss artist Bruno Manser works to save the Penan tribe of the Malaysian forest.
"Back Pain / Structural Colours"	January 18, 1989	07
"Roger Tory Peterson: Portrait of a Bird Watcher Update"	February 22, 1989	08
"Edge of Ice"	March 2, 1989	09
"The New Face of Leprosy"	May 17, 1989	10
"AIDS: A Report"	July 19, 1989	11

== Season 30: 1989–1990 ==
Title	Broadcast date	Episode
"(placeholder)"	September 27, 1989	01
Season premiere: History of rubber. Includes its cultivation from wild trees.
"(placeholder)"	December 6, 1989	??
The conservation of rare breeds of farm animals, and the feeding behaviour of the phalarope, an unusual shorebird.
"A look at how various forms of wildlife survive in the Arctic regions. (Part 2 of 2)"	December 27, 1989	??
"The Familiar Face of Love"	February 14, 1990	repeat
The psychological and social forces which shape people's feelings and ideas about the opposite sex.
"Psychologist John Kennedy, from the University of Toronto, examines the ability of blind people to create and interpret visual images."	February 28, 1990	??
"Turning to Dust"	March 14, 1990	??
Host David Suzuki and narrator Angela Fusco present this program on the deterioration of paper in old books around the world. At least one-third of the world's books are turning into particles and dust as they become embrittled. This program describes various methods of book preservation, including re-binding, photocopying, de-acidification and creating micro-fiche copies.
"The Arctic National Wildlife Refuge, a wilderness against the Canada/U.S. border that is the calving grounds of caribou, is threatened by the U.S. Department of the Interior's plans to develop the land for oil"	June 20, 1990	??
"Profiling the declining seabird population on the small islands east of Quebec City"	July 18, 1990	??
"The reasons behind the impending extinction of the black rhino are explored"	August 1, 1990	??
"Through the Looking Glass"	September 5, 1990	??
Dip into the show's archives; see the world and life the way it was 30 years ago.

== Season 31: 1990–1991 ==
Title	Broadcast date	Episode
"The Green Quiz"	October 3, 1990	01
Season premiere: This special quiz from The Nature of Things tests viewer's knowledge of the environment, touching on topics ranging from global warming and the population explosion to compost boxes and toxic chemicals in the home.
"Crying Wolf"	October 10, 1990	02
Hunting, trapping, poisoning, and aerial gunning of Canada's gray wolf population: the controversial issue of wolf control in Canada.
"(Placeholder)"	October 17, 1990	03
Ghana prospers by recycling car parts, and Herschel Island, off the Yukon coast, shelters life during the brief Arctic summer.
"Blowpipes and Bulldozers"	October 24, 1990	repeat
Swiss artist Bruno Manser discusses his life with the nomadic Penan tribe of Malaysia.
"The Insect World"	November 7, 1990	04
Cornell University professor Tom Eisner reveals secrets of the insect world.
"The Vietnamese People's Struggle"	November 28, 1990	05
"Voices in the Forest"	February 3, 1991	Special
David Suzuki and The Nature of Things take on the powerful forest industry, examining environmentally questionable forestry practices.
"Running for Their Lives"	April 12, 1991	06

== Season 32: 1991–1992 ==
Title	Broadcast date	Episode
"The Debate on Animal Research Issues"	October 2, 1991	01
Season premiere: Animal research.
"(Placeholder)"	October 9, 1991	02
The Canadian grizzly.
"Air Crash"	October 16, 1991	03
Investigators determine plane-crash causes.
"The Insect World"	October 23, 1991	repeat
Cornell University professor Tom Eisner reveals secrets of the insect world.
"The Insect World"	November 6, 1991	repeat
Professor Tom Eisner of Cornell examines the insect world.
"The Life of the Wild Dog"	December 4, 1991	??
"Lasers: Brighter Than the Sun"	January 15, 1992	??
"Journey to the Source"	February 5, 1992	??
Three communities threatened by the dumping of toxic wastes are profiled.
"Connecting Flights: Shorebird Migration"	March 18, 1992	??

== Season 33: 1992–1993 ==
Title	Broadcast date	Episode
"The Last Survivors"	November 4, 1992	01
"Living With Stress"	November 11, 1992	02
"If Caribou Could Vote"	November 18, 1992	03
"The Elements"	November 25, 1992	04
"Back Street Bandits/Milkweed"	February 16, 1992	05
"End of the Line"	December 16, 1992	06
"Toys"	December 23, 1992	07
"In the Company of Moose"	January 6, 1993	08
"The Mystery of the Mind"	January 20, 1993	09
"Monkey Business"	January 27, 1993	10
"Diabetes: Blood Sugar, Sweat and Tears"	February 3, 1993	11
"Baboons"	February 16, 1993	12
"Coral Reefs: Rain Forests of the Sea"	February 24, 1993	13
"Pumping Hormones"	March 24, 1993	14
"The Hidden World of the Bog"	March 31, 1993	15
Looks at bogs, the mysterious foggy wetlands with a reputation for being dangerous and expendible, which in fact contain a rich and intriguing diversity of plants and animals.
"A Climate for Change"	May 30, 1993	16

== Season 34: 1993–1994 ==
Title	Broadcast date	Episode
"Vitamins: Hype or Hope"	October 6, 1993	01
Season premiere: Examines vitamins and possible vitamin therapies in the future.
"End of the Line"	October 13, 1993	02
David Suzuki updates a report on overfishing and other man-made threats to the oceans.
"The Pyramid Builders"	October 20, 1993	03
Stonemasons and laborers try to construct a pyramid exactly the way it was done 4,000 years ago.
"The Living City"	October 27, 1993	04
Alternatives to sprawling suburbs.
"(Placeholder)"	November 3, 1993	repeat
An elephant-seal pup learns to swim, dive, sleep under water and recognize food.
"The Shoreline Doesn't Stop Here Anymore"	November 10, 1993	05
Beachfront property owners try to stop the process of erosion.
"Living Color"	November 17, 1993	06
Color: how it is perceived and how it affects everyday life.
"No Spare Parts"	November 24, 1993	repeat
Small workshops use recycled automobile parts and traditional crafting skills to produce machinery of great benefit to the local people.
"What's in a Neem?"	December 1, 1993	07
The Nature of Things devotes a full hour to discussing the current and possible uses of this tropical tree.
"Ancient Futures: Learning from Ladakh"	December 15, 1993	08
Ladakh is a desert land high in the western Himalayas that is now experiencing rapid modernisation and "development" that is degrading both the environment and the culture. Ancient Futures examines the root causes of environmental and social problems and compels the viewer to re-examine what is meant by "progress".
"Seasons of the Sea"	December 22, 1993	repeat
Life cycles of creatures in California's undersea forests of giant kelp.
"The Invaders"	January 5, 1994	??
"Greening Business"	January 19, 1994	??
"Crater of the Rain God"	January 26, 1994	??
"Allergies: Nothing to Sneeze At"	February 2, 1994	??
"Wolves of the Sea"	February 9, 1994	??
"Tiger Crisis"	February 16, 1994	??
"Tiger Crisis"	February 23, 1994	??
"Songbirds"	March 2, 1994	??
"Tuberculosis: The Forgotten Plague"	March 9, 1994	??
"Memory: The Past Imperfect"	March 20, 1994	??

== Season 35: 1994–1995 ==
Title	Broadcast date	Episode
"Easy Targets"	October 6, 1994	01
Season premiere: An in-depth look at the child abuse, its victims, its perpetrators and its prevention.
"Balancing Act/Kids Go Wild"	October 13, 1994	02
"Falcons by the Sea/Milkweed"	October 19, 1994	03
"Shadows in a Desert Sea"	October 20, 1994	04
A profile of life within the Sea of Cortez; a stretch of water between the Baja Peninsula and the coast of Mexico.
"Through the Looking Glass (is this a repeat from 09/05/1990 ?)"	October 22, 1994	05
"Lives in Limbo"	October 27, 1994	06
The Nature of Things examines chronic fatigue syndrome and talks with the world's leading experts, doctors, researchers and victims about this illness which causes a life of misery for those afflicted.

== Season 36: 1995–1996 ==
Title	Broadcast date	Episode
"Where The Heron Finds Its Home"	October 12, 1995	01
North America's great blue heron is being discovered by biologists to be a sensitive indicator of the state of our wetlands. If herons are abundant, the wetlands they inhabit form a healthy ecosystem.
"Alternative Medicine: Teaching New Doctors Old Tricks"	October 19, 1995	02
Interviews with doctors regarding alternative medicine. Topics include acupuncture, homeopathy, ayurveda, and aboriginal medicine.
"Back to Basics"	January 4, 1996	??
Back to Basics focuses on back pain in the workplace, and provides some of the latest information on the value of exercise in the prevention, management and treatment of back pain.
"Why Sex?"	February 1, 1996	??
A look at scientific explanations for that mysterious and unparalleled force known as 'sex'.
"Martin Gardner: Mathemagician"	March 26, 1996	??

== Season 37: 1996–1997 ==
Title	Broadcast date	Episode
"Skin Deep: The Science of Race"	October 3, 1996	01
"The Three Gorges Dam"	October 10, 1996	02
"Roger Tory Peterson; Portrait of a Birdwatcher"	October 17, 1996	repeat
"Vanishing Wetlands"	October 24, 1996	03
We now understand the importance of wetlands to our watersheds, but this has not always been the case. Vanishing Wetlands describes how almost all of the wetlands in Europe and North America have been drained and filled to make way for industrial development and agriculture. The viewer learns about the water cycle and how wetlands reduce the severity of floods by storing excess water during flooding events, how wetlands act as filters and allow sediment to settle before reaching waterways, how a wetland is utilized by both aquatic and terrestrial species, and the importance of wetlands to migratory birds.
"Paul Ehrlich and the Population Bomb"	October 31, 1996	04
"Alternative Medicine: Teaching New Doctors Old Tricks"	November 7, 1996	repeat
"Pelicans and Cormorants: Prairie Scapegoats"	November 14, 1996	05
"The Child Who Couldn't Play"	November 21, 1996	repeat
"Asthma: Air of Mystery"	December 5, 1996	06
"Learning to Love the Creepy Crawlies"	December 12, 1996	repeat
"Bald Eagle: Searching for Home"	December 19, 1996	07
In many places bald eagles return to find their habitat occupied and their food supply gone. This program explains how commercial fishing, logging and urban sprawl have destroyed salmon stocks, which in turn affects bald eagles who feed on the fish.
"John Livingston: The Natural History of a Point of View"	January 16, 1997	repeat
John Livingston makes observations critical toward what he terms a "human-centered orthodoxy," and the idea that we have conceptually separated ourselves from nature. He discusses the general elements of various issues relating to conservation, environment, nature, and development, making the program readily understandable and potentially appropriate to a wide variety of audiences.
"Echo of the Elephants: The Next Generation"	January 23, 1997	repeat
"Dealing With Drugs Update"	January 30, 1997	repeat
"The Great Buffalo Delta"	February 6, 1997	repeat
"The Friendly Atom: An Industrial History"	February 13, 1997	08
"Yellowstone to Yukon: The Wild Heart of North America"	February 20, 1997	09
A journey is taken through the untamed grandeur of the Rocky Mountains... all the way from Yellowstone National Park to Canada's Yukon Territory. An effort to create a wildlife corridor through this length of the Rockies is presented.
"The Trouble With Malaria"	February 27, 1997	10
The Nature of Things looks at the way in which changes in the environment put people at greater risk of contracting disease, and how misuse of infection-fighting drugs helps the malaria organism to build its own resistance.
"Hormone Imposters"	March 27, 1997	11
Hormone Imposters looks at the way chemicals in our everyday lives are infiltrating our bodies, mimicking our hormones. By doing this, they trigger unwanted activities and block other crucial biological events from taking place.

== Season 38: 1998 ==
Title	Broadcast date	Episode
"Secret Fears"	January 8, 1998	01
Season Opener: The Nature of Things hears firsthand from patients who are fighting to rule their fears, rather than be ruled by them.
"Lost in the Suburbs"	January 15, 1998	02
An examination of the social, economic and environmental implications of sprawl – low-density development that spreads out from the edge of cities and towns and consumes farmland, forest and wetlands.
"Wildlife for Sale – Dead or Alive!"	January 22, 1998	03
"Not So Sweet"	January 29, 1998	04
"Little Brother Fights Back"	February 5, 1998	05
"Labrador: The Way of the Caribou"	February 26, 1998	06
"Hot Flash on Menopause"	March 5, 1998	07
"Fisheries: Beyond the Crisis"	March 12, 1998	08
Having fished the oceans beyond their limit, one fishery after another collapses. The Nature of Things poses the crucial question: how can we manage fisheries in a sustainable manner?
"(Placeholder)"	March 19, 1998	09
"The Friendly Atom: An Industrial History"	March 26, 1998	10
A look at how the nuclear power industry continues to re-invent itself despite the fact that no new construction of a nuclear reactor has begun in North America since the 1970s.
"Out of the Shadows"	April 9, 1998	11
This program is about reconstructive surgery and looks at children with extreme facial deformities, the difficulties they encounter and the new breakthroughs in medical technology available to them.
"A Look On Obesity"	April 16, 1998	12

== Season 39: 1998–1999 ==
Title	Broadcast date	Episode
"Up Close and Personal: The Ecology of David Suzuki"	October 8, 1998	01
"High Society: Reefer Madness 2"	October 15, 1998	02
"Grasslands"	November 5, 1998	03
"Good Wood"	November 26, 1998	04
"Look Who's Talking...How Animals Communicate"	December 3, 1998	05
"Chimps on Death Row"	January 21, 1999	06
"Man and Dog: An Evolving Partnership"	January 28, 1999	07
"Weighing the Options: Elective Scoliosis Surgery"	February 11, 1999	08
"Escape From Earth"	February 18, 1999	09
A look at how close we are to being able to send humans to planets in a distant solar system. Astronauts, including Canada's Chris Hadfield, talk about their own experiences in space. And host David Suzuki delivers some of his commentaries in a state of weightlessness. A two-hour special.
"How to Live to 100 "	February 25, 1999	10
"Dead Heat"	March 4, 1999	11
"The Pill"	March 11, 1999	12
"Turning Down the Heat"	April 8, 1999	13
"Wonders of the World"	April 15, 1999	14

== Season 40: 1999–2000 ==
Title	Broadcast date	Episode
"Phallacies"	October 4, 1999	01
Season Opener: Myths and misconceptions are often born from the concealment of facts. This program brings the penis front and center for an unfettered study of the male organ's place in history, art, religion, and contemporary life.
"How To Live To 100"	October 11, 1999	repeat
"The Hidden Killer: Portrait of an Epidemic"	October 18, 1999	02
A documentary reconstructing a health emergency in Arizona; the killer was discovered to be the mouse-borne Hantavirus.
"Parkinson's: Lynda's Story"	October 25, 1999	03
"Lost"	November 8, 1999	04
"Designing for Dignity: Engineering Body Parts"	November 22, 1999	05
"Race for the Future"	November 29, 1999	06
"Race for the Future, Part 2"	December 6, 1999	07
"The Sleep Famine"	January 24, 2000	08
"Do Parents Matter?"	February 7, 2000	09
"Silent Sentinels"	February 21, 2000	10
Mass bleaching of coral has swept the world's tropical oceans, in places leaving hundreds of miles of coral coastline severely damaged. This program examines the issues associated with damage to corals: rising temperatures, and acidification due to increasing amounts of carbon dioxide in the atmosphere.
"Wild Goose Chase"	February 28, 2000	11
Wild Goose Chase explores the ways in which city-dwelling Canada geese and arctic-nesting lesser snow geese have turned the modern, human-altered landscape to their advantage.
"Humans: Who are We, Part 1 – The Birth of The Human Mind"	March 13, 2000	12
"Humans: Who Are We?, Part 2 – The Human Invasion"	March 20, 2000	13
"Weather: Dragons of Chaos"	March 27, 2000	14
"Horses of Suffield"	June 25, 2000	repeat
This documentary explores the fate of the endangered wild Suffield horses of Alberta. Located near a military base close to Medicine Hat, these animals were originally domesticated but returned to the wild over generations.

== Season 41: 2000–2001 ==
Title	Broadcast date	Episode
"Nuclear Dynamite"	October 5, 2000	01
Scientists in the United States and the Soviet Union planned to harness the power of the nuclear bomb to launch huge spaceships, dig an instant harbor in Alaska, blast out oil and gas deposits, cut through mountain ranges, and dig a new Panama canal. More than 150 nuclear blasts were carried out before this extraordinary atomic dream was destroyed by the emergence of the environmental movements in both countries.
"Breath of Life"	October 12, 2000	02
"Spare Parts"	October 19, 2000	03
"Lost Worlds: Wild South America"	November 23, 2000	04
"Lost Worlds: Wild South America: Monkey Jungles"	November 30, 2000	05
"Lost Worlds: Wild South America: Amazon Jungle"	December 7, 2000	06
"Lost Worlds: Wild South America: The Mighty Amazon"	December 14, 2000	07
"Lost Worlds: Wild South America: The Andes"	January 3, 2001	08
An in-depth examination of the Andes, the world's longest mountain chain that reaches from the tropics to Antarctica.
"Amanda's Choice"	January 10, 2001	09
Amanda's Choice is about a teen who has early-onset Alzheimer's in her family and who has to decide whether to get tested for it herself.
"The Secret Life of the Crash Test Dummy"	January 17, 2001	10
The history of the crash test dummy is traced back 50 years to its invention for the US Air Force. The dummy has saved thousands of lives. But has the time come to retire this selfless hero of countless car and airplane crashes?
"Lost Worlds: Wild South America: Penguin Shores"	January 24, 2001	11
"Lost Worlds: Wild South America: Great Plains"	January 31, 2001	12
"Coastal Forest/Salmon Forest"	February 7, 2001	13
"Fish Farming/The Price of Salmon"	February 14, 2001	14
"Surgeons of the Future"	February 21, 2001	15
"Changing Ground/Maisin People In Papua New Guinea"	February 28, 2001	16
"Toxic Legacies"	March 14, 2001	17
The documentary follows an anthropologist studying communities of children who exhibit significant and disturbing neurological differences, and looks at pesticide use as the possible cause.
"Hospital at the End of the Earth"	March 21, 2001	18
"Worst Case Scenario"	April 4, 2001	19

== Season 42: 2001–2002 ==
Title	Broadcast date	Episode
"Me, My Brain And I Unmasking The Mystery Of The Conscious Mind"	October 2, 2001	01
"Warnings From The Wild"	October 9, 2001	02
"Touch: The Forgotten Sense"	October 16, 2001	03
"Psychopaths"	October 23, 2001	04
"Drug Deals: The Brave New World of Prescription Drugs"	November 13, 2001	05
An in-depth investigation into the influence of pharmaceutical companies on all aspects of drug research, approval and prescription.
"Bioterror"	November 20, 2001	06
"Race Against Time"	November 27, 2001	07
"Return Of The Peregrine"	December 4, 2001	08
"Living Forever"	January 8, 2002	09
"Genetically Modified Foods"	January 15, 2002	10
"Self-Experimenters"	January 22, 2002	11
"Morphine On Trial"	March 5, 2002	12
"Cyberman: Canada's Original Cyborg"	March 12, 2002	13
A Toronto-based inventor, university teacher and cyborg introduces wearable computer technology which has made him "all human with machine-extended parts."
"Wired For Life"	March 19, 2002	14
"Intuition"	March 26, 2002	15
"Beluga Speaking Across Time"	April 9, 2002	16
"Hot Flash On Menopause"	July 23, 2002	17

== Season 43: 2002–2003 ==
Title	Broadcast date	Episode
"Up Close and Toxic"	October 17, 2002	01
Season Premiere: Up Close and Toxic examines the alarming levels of pollutants inside our homes and suggests ways to reduce them.
"Flight of the Whooping Crane"	October 24, 2002	02
The film documents an effort to teach the endangered whooping crane new migration routes to help save the species. The film chronicles the first ultra-light led migration in the fall of 2001.
"A Madman's Journal"	October 31, 2002	03
"Years From Here: the Maisin visit the Stó:lo"	November 7, 2002	04
"Biomimicry: Learning From Nature: Part I"	November 14, 2002	05
"Biomimicry: Learning From Nature: Part II"	November 21, 2002	06
"Through the Lens: A Look Back at the Nature of Things"	November 26, 2002	07
"Recovering Krystal"	January 2, 2003	08
A 14-year-old drug addict and runaway is ordered by the courts to attend an alcohol and drug treatment program. What makes this teen's story distinctive is that her rehabilitation requires that her parents attend counseling as well.
"A Disease Called Pain"	January 9, 2003	09
"Jo'burg: A View From The Summit"	January 16, 2003	10
Jo'burg; A View From the Summit marks the final episode of The Nature of Things 2002/2003 season. The Nature of Things will continue to be repeated on Sundays at 3 pm (EST) on CBC.
"The Investigation of Swissair 111"	April 3, 2003	??
"The Man Who Talks with Wolves"	May 25, 2003	??
"Hypnosis, A Window into the Mind"	June 1, 2003	??
Hypnosis is being re-evaluated and is seen by many as a technique that has a useful place in a diverse range of medical, psychological and investigative pursuits.
"Great Natural Wonders of the World"	June 8, 2003	??
A journey across the seven continents in search of the world's most impressive and inspiring wild landscapes and natural marvels.
"The Navigators (Part I)"	June 15, 2003	??
Nicolas Baudin and Matthew Flinders' exploration and colonization of Terra Australis.
"The Navigators (Part II)"	June 22, 2003	??
"S.A.R.S.-The True Story"	June 29, 2003	??
"Hotel Heliconia"	August 17, 2003	??
"Sea of Snakes"	August 24, 2003	??
"Almost Home: A Sayisi Dene Journey"	August 31, 2003	??
The Sayisi Dene people of Tadoule Lake in northern Manitoba are a people with a nomadic history of following and hunting the caribou. In 1956, the federal government forced them to give up their ways and move to Churchill, Manitoba. What followed was many years of hardship, more re-location, and eventually a return to their homeland.
"Moving Sands"	September 14, 2003	??
The unlikely epic of 43 km of sand and 500 years of history: Sable Island, off the shores of Nova Scotia.
"Easter Island: Eyes of the Moai"	September 21, 2003	??
Easter Island is the most remote inhabited place on our planet. For 1,500 years, this isolation has acted as both a shelter for – and a curse upon – the island's indigenous Rapa Nui people.

== Season 44: 2003–2004 ==
Title	Broadcast date	Episode
"The Ghosts of Lomako (Season Premier)"	October 22, 2003	01
The Ghosts Of Lomako follows Belgian primatologist Jef Dupain as he returns to his research camp in Upper Congo, to observe the conditions affecting the bonobo, a great ape and endangered species.
"The Shark Tracker"	October 29, 2003	02
"The Man Who Studies Murder Part I"	November 5, 2003	03
"The Man Who Studies Murder Part II"	November 12, 2003	04
"The Crossing"	November 19, 2003	05
"Canada's Amazon: A Boreal Forest Journey"	November 26, 2003	06
"The Weight of the World"	December 3, 2003	07
"Farm Inc. Part I"	January 7, 2004	08
"Corporate Agriculture: The Hollow Men"	January 7, 2004	08
"Farm Inc. Part II"	January 14, 2004	09
"Alternative Agriculture: Food For Life"	January 14, 2004	09
"The Value of Life: AIDS in Africa Revisited"	January 21, 2004	10
"Arctic Mission: The Great Adventure"	January 28, 2004	11
"Arctic Mission: Lords of the Arctic"	February 4, 2004	12
"Arctic Mission: People of the Ice"	February 11, 2004	13
"Arctic Mission: Washed Away"	February 18, 2004	14
"Arctic Mission: Climate on the Edge"	February 25, 2004	15
"Minor Keys"	March 3, 2004	16
"When Every Moment Counts"	March 10, 2004	17
"Walking With Ghosts"	March 17, 2004	18
"When is Enough, Enough?"	March 31, 2004	19
"Wild Australasia: Ep. 1 – Wild Australasia"	July 4, 2004	Special
This first program of the series is a sweeping introduction to the natural wonders of Australia and reveals why its natural history has become so distinctive and strange.
"Wild Australasia: Ep. 2 – Desert Heart"	July 11, 2004	Special
Australia is the driest inhabited continent on earth, but its huge desert centre is no barren wasteland – it's full of stunning landscapes and surprising wildlife.
"Wild Australasia: Ep. 3 – Southern Seas"	July 18, 2004	Special
The seas Down Under stretch from the dazzling topics to the wild, southern ocean and are full of surprises.
"Wild Australasia: Ep. 4 – Gum Tree Country"	July 25, 2004	Special
"The Bush" is the classic Australian landscape – and these weird and magical gum tree woodlands are home to the most famous Aussie animals.
"Wild Australasia: Ep. 5 – Island Arks"	August 1, 2004	Special
The seas Down Under contain a string of exotic islands, from tropical New Guinea to icy New Zealand, each with its own stunning landscapes and unique wildlife.
"Wild Australasia: Ep. 6 – New World"	August 8, 2004	Special
Australia is famously full of the weirdest animals, living undisturbed for almost 50 million years. But they are no longer alone here: people have also come to live in this land.
"Dope: Scientists and Sleuths Battle for the Soul of Sport"	August 10, 2004	Special
Drug detection experts are determined to ensure Athens Olympics 2004 is run clean, by probing to expose drug-designing chemists, dealers, crooked coaches and athletes who are prepared to do anything to win.

== Season 45: 2004–2005 ==
Title	Broadcast date	Episode
"Sex, Lies and Secrecy: Dissecting Hysterectomy"	September 16, 2004	01
Three-quarters of a million hysterectomies are performed annually in North America. In close to 80% of these the ovaries are removed at the time of surgery, which robs women of a natural and healthy hormonal balance, and which can result in subsequent problems. This documentary looks at the choices being made and possible less-invasive alternatives.
"Terrible Lizards of Oz"	September 23, 2004	02
"Selling Sickness"	September 30, 2004	03
"Arktika: The Russian Dream That Failed"	October 7, 2004	04
"Shipbreakers"	October 14, 2004	05
Shipbreakers takes audiences to a remote stretch of beach on the Arabian Sea where obsolete ships are disassembled into smouldering scrap metal and toxic waste.
"Clot Busters"	October 21, 2004	06
"Killed By Care: Making Medicine Safe"	October 28, 2004	07
"Tale of a Tiny Bird"	November 4, 2004	08
Magic and understanding blossom when an imaginative young girl meets the King of the Songbirds. Traveling with him, to his kingdom among the dunes of Courland on the Baltic, she is granted unprecedented access to the private lives of tiny birds. She also gets a chance to observe scientists, who have devoted their lives to studying birds and their epic migratory journeys.
"Apocalypse Cow: The Mad Cow Story (Part 1)"	November 18, 2004	09
"Apocalypse Cow: The Mad Cow Story (Part 2)"	November 25, 2004	10
"Bhopal: The Search for Justice"	December 9, 2004	11
Bhopal: The Search for Justice looks at the 1984 chemical leak in Bhopal, India, which killed fifteen thousand people at the time and continues to have severe health effects on people who were in contact with the chemical cloud when the leak occurred.
"Forbidden Forest"	January 6, 2005	12
Two men concerned about forestry policies on New Brunswick lands urge company officials and the New Brunswick government to practice responsible forestry, and they propose a new, community-based forestry policy – one that is environmentally sustainable and that produces more jobs than the highly capital-intensive, mechanized techniques being used.
"Passion & Fury: The Emotional Brain: Anger"	March 22, 2005	special
Uncover the startling discoveries researchers make when they scan the brains of sociopaths and learn about the scientific studies that may answer the question: does biology dictate destiny? See how these studies are being put to use in helping young people cope with anger at an early age.
"Passion & Fury: The Emotional Brain: Love"	March 29, 2005	special
Anthropologists dissect this emotion to its core: lust, romantic love and attachment. How we are aroused is explored: smell and tone of voice play into attraction and compatibility. Peel back the layers of the most profound expression of our humanity.
"Passion & Fury: The Emotional Brain: Fear"	May 11, 2005	special
What triggers fear, our physiological reactions, and what purpose it serves are studied. Scientists investigate how our brain assesses the need for fight or flight.
"Passion & Fury: The Emotional Brain: Happiness"	May 18, 2005	special
Drawing a distinction between the lasting state of happiness and the pursuit of instant pleasure, the program explores the evolutionary role of happiness, and asks what happens in the brain, and possibly in our genes, that make some people happy and others sad.
"Fighting Fire with Fire"	May 26, 2005	13
Fighting Fire with Fire raises questions about conventional methods of fighting fire, and whether decades of suppressing fire have simply made matters worse.
"Being Caribou: Part 1"	June 2, 2005	14
Hoping to raise awareness of the threat to the survival of the Porcupine caribou herd presented by the proposed exploitation of the oil and gas reserves in the Arctic National Wildlife Refuge, a husband-and-wife-team follow the herd of 120,000 caribou on foot across 1,500 kilometers of rugged Arctic tundra.
"Being Caribou: Part 2"	June 9, 2005	15
"Whale Mission: The Last Giants"	June 23, 2005	16
Climb aboard the sailboat Sedna IV with Jean Lemire, and navigate due north in the waters of the perilous Atlantic Ocean to reach the distant Cape Farewell, where the captain and his crew hope to find the whales.
"Whale Mission: Keepers of Memory"	June 30, 2005	17
"Origins of Human Aggression: The Other Story"	July 7, 2005	18
Examines the complex factors that affect the socialization of aggressive behavior among humans. Biological, environmental and psychological components are addressed, and guidelines for the prevention of human violence are provided.
"Five Seasons"	July 14, 2005	19
The Numurindi people from Australia's South East Arnemland have developed a culture where all things past and present, including the weather, are interrelated. This relationship extends to the animal kingdom and plant life, as well as previous generations. Five Seasons explores this delicate relationship through the eyes of the Numurindi people who enjoy the benefits of the modern world, yet are still guided by the seasons and the traditions of the past.

== Season 46: 2005–2006 ==
Title	Broadcast date	Episode
"Tarantula: Australia's King of Spiders"	August 31, 2005	01
46th Season Premiere: A close-up look at a very large spider – the tarantula.
"Nature Bites Back: The Case of the Sea Otter"	September 14, 2005	02
"Earth Energy"	October 19, 2005	03
"Change of Heart"	October 26, 2005	04
"Change of Heart" follows the team at the Cardiac Transplant Program at Toronto General Hospital, through weeks of intense work as they try to achieve the best outcomes for four remarkable patients in a race against time.
"The Secret Life of Babies"	November 2, 2005	05
Ever wonder what babies think and do while they're waiting around to be born? Or young infants, who can't speak but still express a huge range of emotions? The Nature of Things presents a two-hour special that examines the amazing powers of the fetus and infant.
"Tsepong: A Clinic Called Hope"	November 9, 2005	06
Tsepong: A Clinic Called Hope looks at the situation of HIV/AIDS in Africa, and the complexity of making widespread treatment viable.
"Port Hope: A Question of Power"	November 16, 2005	07
Port Hope, Ontario has all the hallmarks of an ideal small Ontario town, with one of the loveliest main streets in Canada. But Port Hope also has one big problem – thousands of tonnes of radioactive waste. And now the industry that created the problem wants to introduce a new potential risk in town: the proposed production of an enriched uranium fuel. Port Hope: A Question of Power follows a community for more than a year as it struggles to find answers to questions concerning the health and safety implications of the proposed project.
"Everyday Einstein"	June 18, 2006	08
"Homo Sapiens: The Rise of Our Species (Pt.1)"	June 25, 2006	09
"Homo Sapiens: The Rise of Our Species (Pt. 2)"	July 2, 2006	10
"Ghosts of Futures Past: Tom Berger in the North"	July 9, 2006	11
"Blue Buddha: Lost secrets of Tibetan Medicine"	July 16, 2006	12
"Beetalker: The Secret World of Bees"	July 23, 2006	13
"Cuba: The Accidental Revolution (Pt. 1)"	July 30, 2006	14
"Cuba: The Accidental Revolution (Pt. 2)"	August 6, 2006	15
"When Less is More"	August 13, 2006	16

== 2006–2007: Specials ==
Title	Broadcast date	Episode
"Stephen Lewis: The Man Who Couldn't Sleep"	December 6, 2006	Special
Stephen Lewis criss-crosses Africa in a relentless effort to motivate response to the HIV/AIDS epidemic there.
"Wild Caribbean: Hurricane Hell"	June 10, 2007	Special
"Build Green"	June 17, 2007	??
David Suzuki sets out across Canada to discover the latest in green housing. It is shown that a small investment can translate into three pluses: a rock-solid house, eco-friendliness and saving big bucks.
"Wild Caribbean: Reefs and Wrecks"	June 24, 2007	Special
"Wild Caribbean: Treasure Island"	July 22, 2007	Special
"Wild Caribbean: Secret Shores"	July 29, 2007	Special
"Cuttlefish – The Brainy Bunch"	August 12, 2007	??
Cuttlefish have one of the largest brain to body ratios of all invertebrates. But does this mean they are intelligent? Cuttlefish – The Brainy Bunch explores the unusual capabilities and intelligence of cuttlefish.
"Mystery of the Giant Sloths Cave"	August 19, 2007	??
The Mystery of the Giant Sloths Cave retells the discovery of an exceptional palaeological deposit that will revolutionize our knowledge of giant sloths. A gargantuan sloths skeleton is discovered that is perfectly preserved.
"Geologic Journey: The Great Lakes (Part 1 of 5)"	September 9, 2007	Special
"Geologic Journey: The Rockies (Part 2 of 5)"	September 16, 2007	Special
"Geologic Journey: The Canadian Shield (Part 3 of 5)"	September 23, 2007	Special
"Geologic Journey: The Appalachians (Part 4 of 5)"	September 30, 2007	Special
"Geologic Journey: The Atlantic Coast (Part 5 of 5)"	October 7, 2007	Special

== Season 47: 2007–2008 ==
Title	Broadcast date	Episode
"The Bear Man of Kamchatka"	October 11, 2007	01
Charlie Russell proves that it is possible to live peacefully with one of the world's most feared and misunderstood creatures. (50 minute abbreviated version of The Edge of Eden: Living with Grizzlies)
"Living Forever: The Longevity Revolution"	October 18, 2007	02
"Weather Report"	October 25, 2007	03
"Game Over: Conservation in Kenya"	November 1, 2007	04
"The Man with the Golden Cells"	November 8, 2007	05
"The Nature of Things Magazine"	November 15, 2007	06
"Climate Change I: An Uncertain Future"	November 22, 2007	07
"Climate Change II: Hot Times in the City"	November 29, 2007	08
"The Nature of Things Magazine"	December 6, 2007	09
"The Edge of Eden – Living with Grizzlies"	January 6, 2008	special
The Edge of Eden: Living with Grizzlies (previously broadcast in abbreviated form as The Bear Man of Kamchatka) tracks Canadian bear expert Charlie Russell as he rescues two orphaned cubs destined for death in a squalid Russian zoo. Charlie becomes their surrogate mother and shows them the lay of the land in their new home territory; what plants to eat, how to catch fish and how to escape from predatory male bears. In a world where "might makes right" and aggression becomes the only way to deal with conflicts, Charlie Russell is proving that it is possible to live peacefully with one of the world's most feared and misunderstood creatures.
"The Science of the Senses: Hearing"	January 10, 2008	10
"The Science of the Senses: Touch"	January 17, 2008	11
"The Science of the Senses: Smell/Taste"	January 24, 2008	12
"The Science of the Senses: Sight"	January 31, 2008	13
"Wild China: Heart of the Dragon"	June 22, 2008	special
The first episode in the Wild China series investigates how China's 1.3 billion people interact with their vast and various wildlife and landscapes.
"Wild China: Shangi-La"	June 28, 2008	special
Wild China: Shangi-La explores the mysteries of China's southwest jungles, examining how these remote forests exist.
"Wild China: The Tibetan Plateau"	June 29, 2008	special
The third episode journeys to one of the most remote places in the world, and looks at the Tibetan plateau.
"Wild China: Land of the Panda"	July 5, 2008	special
Land of the Panda explores The Great Wall, the Temple of Heaven and Beijing's new Olympic Stadium, and examines the significant development China has undergone over the past 50 years.
"Wild China: Beyond the Great Wall"	July 12, 2008	special
Beyond the Great Wall travels to China's north, and looks at how this area has shaped some of the country's most interesting people and wildlife.
"Wild China: Tides of Change"	July 13, 2008	special
Tides of Change concludes the series by visiting China's coast; an area of contrasts from modern cities to wild wetlands.
"Antarctic Mission: Islands at the Edge"	July 20, 2008	special
Islands at the Edge follows the SEDNA IV as it sails across the Polar Front, one of the last great wildlife refuges on the planet.
"Antarctic Mission: Window on a Changing Climate"	July 27, 2008	special
Window on a Changing Climate looks at the impact of climate change by examining its effects on colonies of Adelie penguins.
"Antarctic Mission: The Great Ocean of Ice"	August 3, 2008	special
The Great Ocean of Ice looks beneath the surface into the cold world that is home to some of the most unusual creatures on the planet.
"Antarctic Mission: The Last Continent"	August 30, 2008	special
The Last Continent introduces the crew of the SEDNA IV as they set off to observe the consequences of climate change on Antarctica.

== Season 48: 2008–2009 ==
Title	Broadcast date	Episode
"The Hobbit Enigma"	October 16, 2008	01
Season Premiere: Is it a new species of ancient pre-human, or just an abnormally small member of our own species? Scientists study a tiny, misshapen prehistoric skeleton in The Hobbit Enigma.
"Rodney's Robot Revolution"	October 23, 2008	02
Engineer and inventor Rodney Brooks pursues the design a robot that can think for itself.
"The Adventurers: The Last Nomads"	October 30, 2008	03
"The Adventurers: The Everlasting Oasis"	November 6, 2008	04
"The Adventurers: A Story Told in Stone"	November 13, 2008	05
"The Suzuki Diaries: Europe"	November 16, 2008	06
"The Adventurers: The Lost People of Baja"	November 20, 2008	07
"The Brain that Changes Itself"	November 27, 2008	08
"Gone Sideways"	January 8, 2009	09
"Black Wave: The Legacy of the Exxon Valdez"	January 15, 2009	10
"Supercar: Building the Car of the Future"	January 29, 2009	11
"Living City: A Critical Guide"	February 5, 2009	12
"Inuit Odyssey"	February 12, 2009	13
"American Savannah"	February 19, 2009	14
"Arctic Meltdown: A Changing World"	June 20, 2009	special
Arctic Meltdown: A Changing World examines how Arctic nations are racing to claim control over the Arctic's resources and shipping routes.
"Arctic Meltdown: The Arctic Passages"	June 27, 2009	special
Arctic Meltdown: The Arctic Passages explores the Northwest Passage and how these dangerous waters are suddenly becoming accessible to businesses and shipping.
"Arctic Meltdown: Adapting to Change"	July 4, 2009	special
Arctic Meltdown: Adapting to Change tracks two different Arctics – one that is the storybook land of ice, snow and polar bears and the other that is covered with petroleum plants and pipelines carrying fossil fuels.

== Season 49: 2009–2010 ==
Title	Broadcast date	Episode
"A Murder of Crows"	October 11, 2009	01
Season opener: A Murder of Crows explores what is known and being discovered about crows, which have been found through research and observation to be very intelligent.
"Mini Monsters of Amazonia"	October 18, 2009	02
"Broken Tail's Last Journey"	October 25, 2009	03
"Darwin's Brave New World: Origins"	November 1, 2009	04
"Darwin's Brave New World: Evolutions"	November 8, 2009	05
"Darwin's Brave New World: Publish and Be Damned"	November 15, 2009	06
"Suzuki Diaries: Coastal Canada"	November 22, 2009	07
"To Bee or Not to Bee"	January 7, 2010	08
"Bugs, Bones & Botany: The Science of Crime"	January 21, 2010	09
"The Downside of High"	January 28, 2010	10
"Bat & Man"	February 4, 2010	11
"My Nuclear Neighbour"	February 11, 2010	12
"Uakari: Secrets of the Red Monkey"	February 18, 2010	13
"One Ocean: Birth of an Ocean"	March 4, 2010	14
"One Ocean: Footprints in the Sand"	March 11, 2010	15
"One Ocean: Mysteries of the Deep"	March 18, 2010	16
"One Ocean: The Changing Sea"	March 25, 2010	17
"Masters of Space"	April 1, 2010	18
Masters of Space explores the emerging competition between major industrial nations to control space, and looks at the topic of space as a "new arena for war".

== Season 50: 2010–2011 ==
Title	Broadcast date	Episode
"Aliens of the Deep Sea"	September 23, 2010	01
"Changing Your Mind"	September 30, 2010	02
"For the Love of Elephants"	October 14, 2010	03
For the Love of Elephants takes viewers inside the emotional world of baby orphaned African elephants and their compassionate keepers.
"Geologic Journey 2: Tectonic Europe (July 8, 1997)"	October 21, 2010	04
"Geologic Journey 2: Along the African Rift (September 2, 1997)"	October 28, 2010	05
"Geologic Journey 2: The Western Pacific Rim (November 4, 1997)"	November 4, 2010	06
"Geologic Journey 2: The Pacific Rim: Americas (January 13, 1998)"	November 18, 2010	07
"Geologic Journey 2: The Collision Zone: Asia (March 17, 1998)"	November 25, 2010	08
"When North Goes South"	December 2, 2010	09
"Code Breakers"	January 13, 2011	10
"Tipping Point: The Age of the Oil Sands"	January 27, 2011	11
"The Last Grizzly"	February 3, 2011	12
"Return of the Prairie Bandit"	February 10, 2011	13
The film charts the progress made by wildlife biologist Travis Livieri (of Prairie Wildlife Research) who is spearheading the black-footed ferret revival in North America.
"Raccoon Nation"	February 24, 2011	14
"The Real Avatar"	March 3, 2011	15
"Force of Nature: The David Suzuki Movie"	March 13, 2011	16
"Save My Lake"	March 17, 2011	17
"50 Years of the Nature of Things"	March 24, 2011	18

== Season 51: 2011–2012 ==
Title	Broadcast date	Episode
"The Nano Revolution: Welcome to Nano City"	October 13, 2011	01
51st Season Premiere: Welcome to Nano City explores nanotechnology's effect on communications integration, security and privacy. Will nanotechnology take us to a safer, more connected future – or an Orwellian police state?
"The Nano Revolution: More Than Human"	October 20, 2011	02
More Than Human delves into the medical and health revolution promised by nanotechnology. Nano-devices can help automate routine laboratory tests or deliver active treatment directly to affected cells, which could have wide-ranging effects on the treatment of disease.
"The Nano Revolution: Will Nano Save the Planet?"	October 27, 2011	03
Scientists believe that nanotechnology could be the key to overcoming some of the great challenges facing the Earth, such as fossil fuels and their impact on climate, the predicted depletion of oil resources, and our continued supply of clean water.
"Jungle Prescription"	November 10, 2011	04
"Emperor's Lost Harbour"	November 17, 2011	05
"Myth or Science"	November 24, 2011	06
"Waking the Green Tiger"	December 1, 2011	07
"Autism Enigma"	December 8, 2011	08
"Programmed to be Fat?"	January 12, 2012	09
"Surviving :) The Teenage Brain"	January 19, 2012	10
"Mysteries of the Animal Mind"	January 26, 2012	11
"The American Tiger"	February 2, 2012	12
"MS Wars: Hope, Science and the Internet"	February 9, 2012	13
"Suzuki Diaries: Future City"	February 16, 2012	14
"Journey to the Disaster Zone"	February 23, 2012	15
"The Perfect Runner"	March 15, 2012	16
An anthropologist explores how humans evolved to become nature's best endurance runners.
"Smarty Plants"	March 22, 2012	17
Explores secret communications of plants.
"Polar Bears: A Summer Odyssey"	April 8, 2012	18
The film shows how polar bears are adapting to changing conditions in their environment or, in some cases, failing to adapt. Episode won the Canadian Screen Award for Best Science or Nature Documentary Program at the 1st Canadian Screen Awards.

== Season 52: 2012–2013 ==
Title	Broadcast date	Episode
"The Buffalo Wolves"	October 18, 2012	01
"Babies: Born to be Good?"	October 25, 2012	02
Examines the sense of morality born into babies and the question of whether human nature is moral.
"Nuts About Squirrels"	November 8, 2012	03
"Planet Hunters"	November 15, 2012	04
Astronomers have developed new ways to find planets and planet candidates circling distant stars.
"The Norse: An Arctic Mystery"	November 22, 2012	05
Patricia Sutherland, an archaeologist for the Canadian Museum of Civilization, makes a case that Norse traders conducted a thriving trade in fur and walrus ivory with the native Dorset peoples on Baffin Island a millennium ago.
"Lights Out!"	December 6, 2012	06
An examination of how artificial light at night is increasingly seen as dangerous to our health.
"David Suzuki's Andean Adventure"	January 10, 2013	07
"Zapped: The Buzz About Mosquitoes"	January 17, 2013	08
"Shattered Ground"	February 7, 2013	09
Explains the science behind fracking (hydraulic fracturing) – and depicts the lives of individuals and communities impacted by its consequences.
"Meet the Coywolf"	February 14, 2013	10
Scientists are beginning to think that Nova Scotia coyotes are evolving into a new species.
"The Fruit Hunters: Evolution of Desire (Part 1 of 2)"	February 21, 2013	11
"The Fruit Hunters: Defenders of Diversity (Part 2 of 2)"	February 28, 2013	12
"Billion Dollar Caribou"	March 21, 2013	13
"The Beaver Whisperers"	March 28, 2013	14
"The Beetles Are Coming"	April 4, 2013	15
The mountain pine beetle is heading east and there's a good chance nothing can stop it from causing extensive damage to the entire Canadian boreal forest.
"The Man Who Tweeted Earth"	April 25, 2013	16

== Season 53: 2013–2014 ==
Title	Broadcast date	Episode
"Carpe Diem: A Fishy Tale"	October 3, 2013	01
Accidentally released into the Mississippi River 30 years ago, the Asian carp have been heading north ever since. It out-eats other species and tilts the food chain in its favour, making it difficult for native species to survive. Can the Asian carp be stopped from entering the Great Lakes?
"Ticked Off: The Mystery Of Lyme Disease"	October 10, 2013	02
"Myth or Science 2: The Quest for Perfection"	October 17, 2013	03
Examines the effects of exercise on aging, the efficiency of high intensity interval training and how the brain can be trained to develop more willpower.
"Brain Magic: The Power of Placebo"	October 24, 2013	04
"Invasion of the Brain Snatchers"	October 31, 2013	05
"Untangling Alzheimer's"	November 14, 2013	06
"A Dog's Life"	November 21, 2013	07
Looks at interesting current canine behavioural science and debunks a lot of the long-held beliefs about "man's best friend."
"Survival of the Fabulous"	November 28, 2013	08
"Where Am I?"	December 5, 2013	09
"The Great Butterfly Hunt"	January 2, 2014	10
"How To Be A Wild Elephant"	January 9, 2014	11
"Secrets in the Bones – The Hunt for the Black Death Killer"	January 16, 2014	12
"Trek of the Titans"	January 30, 2014	13
Secretive leatherback turtles migrate to coast of Nova Scotia several months a year.
"The Allergy Fix"	February 27, 2014	14
Researchers working in Canada, Europe and the United States are on the verge of finding effective treatments for allergies to peanuts, milk and other foods.
"Wild Canada: The Eternal Frontier – A New World"	March 13, 2014	15
"Wild Canada: The Wild West"	March 20, 2014	16
"Wild Canada: The Heartland"	March 27, 2014	17
"Wild Canada: Ice Edge"	April 3, 2014	18
"Making Wild Canada"	April 10, 2014	19
The Wild Canada series has sparked a tide of viewer interest in how the footage was shot, so this making-of episode is presented.

== Season 54: 2014–2015 ==
Title	Broadcast date	Episode
"Stonehenge Uncovered"	October 9, 2014	01
2014-2015 Season Premiere: The most extensive archaeological study ever made of the wider area around Stonehenge reveals new monuments and other structures hidden beneath the World Heritage site that surrounds the Stone Circle.
"Gorilla Doctors"	October 16, 2014	02
A group of veterinarians work to bring the endangered mountain gorilla back from the brink of extinction, one gorilla at a time.
"Dreams of the Future"	October 23, 2014	03
Dr. Jennifer Gardy explores current scientific research that will impact us all in the future, looking at technologies from 3D printing body parts to driverless cars and tree cloning.
"The Cholesterol Question"	October 30, 2014	04
How much do we really know about cholesterol? Have our attempts to lock this culprit up been misguided?
"Decoding Desire"	November 6, 2014	05
Scientists are increasingly looking at animals to reveal more about our own sexual behaviour. Explore how sexual diversity and the experience of pleasure itself may be the key to species survival.
"Chasing Snowflakes"	November 13, 2014	06
In a variety of ways, researchers are bringing snow science into the 21st century.
"The Secret Life of Pigeons"	November 20, 2014	07
The filmmaker postulates that pigeons aren't an urban nuisance but an important cog in city life, to be studied, fancied, raced, and even honoured for their contributions to humanity.
"Two of a Kind"	November 27, 2014	08
A look at how twins are solving medical mysteries as researchers examine the differences between them.
"Myth or Science 3: You Are What You Eat"	January 8, 2015	09
Health claims are put to the test, with evocative experiments that illustrate the results of more large-scale scientific studies about health.
"The Lion in Your Living Room"	January 15, 2015	10
Explores intriguing theories of how the domesticated cat has evolved.
"Mystery of the Monsoon"	January 29, 2015	11
A cinematic exploration of the force of the monsoon and its unpredictability.
"The Kung Fu Meerkats"	February 5, 2015	12
The Kung Fu Meerkats looks at the longest running animal behaviour study ever; a study in which young volunteer graduates and field scientists are trying to unravel the mysteries of meerkat behaviour.
"The Great Human Odyssey: Rise of a Species"	February 12, 2015	13
The filmmaker travels to southern Africa – the so-called cradle of civilization – to visit with a tribe of Kalahari bushmen whose lifestyle and hunting-gathering techniques are virtually identical to those employed by their ancestors thousands of years ago.
"The Great Human Odyssey: The Adaptable Ape"	February 19, 2015	14
This episode of The Great Human Odyssey looks at how humans migrated out of Africa, and onward to other lands.
"The Great Human Odyssey: Journey's End"	February 26, 2015	15
The final installment investigates humanity's most audacious prehistoric trick: crossing the oceans to settle every major island and continent on Earth except Antarctica.
"The Antibiotic Hunters"	March 5, 2015	16
Medical experts around the world are alarmed by the rapid rise of antibiotic-resistant bacteria. This program looks at the causes of antibiotic resistance, and the efforts of researchers seeking to find new antibiotic substances by looking in a variety of exotic places.
"Safe Haven for Chimps"	March 12, 2015	17
Safe Haven for Chimps travels to the American deep south to Chimp Haven sanctuary to meet a special group of chimps, following a landmark decision in the U.S. to retire 300 federally-owned chimpanzees.
"SongbirdSOS"	March 19, 2015	18
A documentary about songbird mass depletion and the compassionate people who are working to turn the tide.
"Spirit Bear Family"	March 26, 2015	19
Spirit Bear Family features two black cubs of the year and their white mother, an especially feisty bear that isn't afraid to take on larger and more dangerous males.
"Jellyfish Rule!"	April 2, 2015	20
A story about one of the planet's most successful animals. Jellyfish thrive in waters where virtually nothing else can, and their numbers are increasing in marine ecosystems around the globe. The proliferation of jellyfish raises an alarm about the condition of the oceans. Troublesome species featured in the program include Mnemiopsis, Cannonball jellyfish, and Nomura's jellyfish.
"Franklin's Lost Ships"	April 9, 2015	21
In 1845 Sir John Franklin set off to find the Northwest Passage through the Canadian Arctic. Franklin, his 2 ships and 129 men were never heard from again. Franklin's Lost Ships takes a look at the discovery of the expedition's flagship Erebus.

== Season 55: 2015–2016 ==
Title	Broadcast date	Episode
"Moose: A Year in the Life of a Twig Eater"	October 15, 2015	01
Shadow a momma moose who has one short year to teach her calf everything it needs to know to survive in the predator-packed forest of Jasper National Park. Winner of the Canadian Screen Award for Science or Nature Documentary Program at the 5th Canadian Screen Awards in 2017.
"The Curious Case of Vitamins and Me"	October 22, 2015	02
The Curious Case of Vitamins and Me seeks to cut through the clutter and often-bogus claims that make the topics of nutrition, vitamins and supplements so confusing for even the most health-conscious of consumers.
"It Takes Guts"	October 29, 2015	03
It Takes Guts explores the links between digestive microbes, diet and weight, and meets researchers who are applying what they've learned in the lab to their everyday lives.
"Giraffes: The Forgotten Giants"	November 5, 2015	04
The science of understanding these complicated, shy creatures and ensuring their survival.
"Sonic Magic: The Wonder and Science of Sound"	November 12, 2015	05
Explore the science of sound.
"Puffin Patrol"	November 19, 2015	06
Puffins spend eight months alone at sea and then come back to land, to hang out and have a good time.
"Manufacturing the Wild"	November 26, 2015	07
Looks at efforts to recreate wild places and habitat for wildlife in locations where the landscape has been heavily altered by humans.
"Ocean Magic at Night"	January 7, 2016	08
Documents a "vertical migration", the movement of billions of ocean animals, including fish, krill, jellyfish, and more, that swim upward more than half a kilometer from the depths of the ocean to feed on plankton near the surface each night.
"Myth or Science 4: In the Eye of the Storm"	January 14, 2016	09
Learn about weather and the extraordinary science that drives these fascinating phenomena.
"Wasted"	January 21, 2016	10
The personal story of a North Vancouver addictions therapist who himself battled alcoholism until he was homeless, and a search of evidence-based addiction treatments.
"Call of the Baby Beluga"	January 28, 2016	11
The film chronicles what happened when humans learned about the intricate social lives and customs of the endangered community of St. Lawrence whales and started to use their new knowledge and empathy to help them.
"Eagles Next Door"	February 4, 2016	12
A breeding pair of bald eagles in the suburbs of Vancouver, Canada, is followed over the course of a year, and adaptations the eagles have made to be successful in the city are observed.
"Trapped in a Human Zoo"	February 11, 2016	13
Based on the diaries of Abraham Ulrikab, this is the story of the journey of eight Inuit who came from Labrador to Europe in 1880, lured by promises of adventures and wealth, only to realize they had been trapped in a world of human zoos. Thirty-five thousand indigenous people from around the world were recruited for these zoos.
"Wolverine: Ghost of the Northern Forest"	February 25, 2016	14
Wolverine: Ghost of the Northern Forest recounts the fascinating story of Canadian wildlife filmmaker Andrew Manske's relentless, five-year quest to find and film the legendary and elusive wolverine.
"The Equalizer"	March 3, 2016	15
Investigate how modern science and technology help athletes achieve new peaks of human performance.
"While You Were Sleeping (The Science of Sleep)"	March 10, 2016	16
Dr. Jennifer Gardy discusses the world of sleep.
"My Brain Made Me Do It"	March 17, 2016	17
A study of how the biology of the brain influences criminal behaviour.
"Suzuki@80"	March 24, 2016	18
On David Suzuki's 80th birthday, The Nature of Things looks at his work as a scientist, environmental activist and television host.
"Pets, Vets and Debts"	March 31, 2016	19
Keeping pets healthy has grown into a billion dollar industry.

== Season 56: 2016–2017 ==
- Thursdays at 8:00 pm
- Length 1 hour

Title	Broadcast date	Episode
"Pompeii's People"	October 6, 2016	01
The city of Pompeii was buried under the ash of Mount Vesuvius in 79 AD, and then rediscovered 1,500 years later in the 18th century. Frozen in time by the ash, Pompeii presents a fascinating window into ancient Roman life, unlike anywhere else on earth.
"Conversations with Dolphins"	October 13, 2016	02
We know that dolphins are intelligent animals, but just how intelligent are they, and how is dolphin intelligence expressed? This film brings us to the research sites of some of the most internationally renowned dolphin specialists, and alongside experts studying dolphins in the wild.
"Running on Empty"	October 20, 2016	03
As California siphons off massive amounts of water from its few remaining wetlands, its sluggish rivers and its aquifers, it faces a water supply that is dropping to an unprecedented low level. Suddenly, hard questions are being asked. Where did all the water go? Whose fault is it? And what needs to change to save California from its overconsumption of the available water resources?
"The Brain's Way of Healing"	October 27, 2016	04
The Brain's Way of Healing is about how science and medicine are looking at the brain in different ways and discovering that ailments and diseases can be dealt with by awakening the brain's own healing capacities.
"Destination: Mars"	November 3, 2016	05
The race to Mars is happening now. Billions are being spent. New generations rockets are being tested. Questions are being asked. How will we get there? How might we settle there? How would we try to transform Mars? Should we?
"Vital Bonds"	November 17, 2016	06
A look inside the evolving science of transplants, where breakthrough discoveries are tackling the organ shortage and transforming the future of medicine.
"Think Like An Animal"	November 24, 2016	07
How smart are animals? Traditionally, we've answered that question by comparing them to us. A psychology professor presents a different approach, in which intelligence is all about what an animal needs to know in order to survive in its world, not ours. Think Like an Animal provides a glimpse into the inner lives of animals and challenges conventional wisdom, raising important questions about how we humans think about and treat our fellow creatures.
"I Got Rhythm: The Science of Song"	December 1, 2016	08
Exploring the science in music and humans. Scientists and archaeologists study human need for music and various effects that music has on people.
"The Secret Life of Owls"	January 12, 2017	09
Learn about owls in this visit with owl experts and owls in the wild and in captivity.
"PTSD: Beyond Trauma"	January 19, 2017	10
PTSD: Beyond Trauma follows researchers and people living with PTSD as they look for answers. Unfolding discoveries raise key questions about the fault-lines of fear and memory, and the roles geography and early development may play in predicting personal responses to trauma.
"Myth or Science: The Secrets of Our Senses"	January 26, 2017	11
Dr. Jennifer Gardy returns to CBC's The Nature of Things with the fifth in the very popular Myth or Science series. In this episode Gardy meets an unusual group of scientists who are rewriting our understanding of how the senses really work. Unique and sometimes bizarre experiments are used to trick our brain into revealing the secrets of our senses.
"The Great Wild Indoors"	February 9, 2017	12
A team of young entomologists are doing a curious kind of fieldwork: entering homes on every continent to do an inventory of the mini-fauna they find. The indoor biome is a world of insects and arachnids as rich, as surprising and as beautiful as any other ecosystem.
"Body Language Decoded"	February 16, 2017	13
Body Language Decoded explores the science behind one of the oldest forms of human communication, and reveals how researchers are unraveling its secrets in unexpected – and often surprising – ways.
"Cracking Cancer"	February 23, 2017	14
Cracking Cancer follows a group of patients, all with incurable cancer, through a highly experimental clinical trial at the BC Cancer Agency. The trial compares patients' normal DNA with that of their tumours, to find the genetic mutations causing their cancer. The research team then searches to find which drug, of all available drugs, might block that growth factor. The results have been quite promising.
"Dad and the Dandelions"	March 2, 2017	15
A filmmaker searches for the origin of the cancer which took the life of his father. Among the possibilities, he looks at the use of lawn pesticides on golf courses as a possible factor leading to cancers, and explores environmentally friendly alternatives for golf course maintenance.
"White Wolves: Ghosts of the Arctic"	March 9, 2017	16
Ghosts of the Arctic follows a family of wolves as they struggle to raise their pups in Canada's northern arctic wilderness.
"ADHD: Not Just For Kids"	March 16, 2017	17
ADHD: Not Just For Kids aims to dispel the myths and stigmas about attention deficit hyperactivity disorder, a condition that many people, kids and adults alike, often live with for years, unrecognized or misdiagnosed.
"Fox Tales"	March 23, 2017	18
Fox Tales presents new research that closely examines the first hours, days, and weeks of a red fox pup's life.

== Season 57: 2017–2018 ==
- Sundays
- Length 1 hour

Title	Broadcast date	Episode
"The Wild Canadian Year: Spring"	September 24, 2017	1
"The Wild Canadian Year: Summer"	October 1, 2017	2
"The Wild Canadian Year: Fall"	October 8, 2017	3
"The Wild Canadian Year: Winter"	October 15, 2017	4
"Making the Wild Canadian Year"	October 22, 2017	5
"Lost Secrets of the Pyramid"	October 29, 2017	6
"Into the Fire"	November 5, 2017	7
"Secrets from the Ice"	November 19, 2017	8
"What Trees Talk About"	November 26, 2017	9
"Jumbo: The Life of an Elephant Superstar"	January 7, 2018	10
"Ice Bridge"	January 14, 2018	11
"Mommy, Wildest"	January 21, 2018	12
"Champions vs. Legends"	January 28, 2018	13
"The Science of Magic"	March 18, 2018	14
"Myth or Science: The Power of Poo"	April 1, 2018	15
"The Kingdom: How Fungi Made Our World"	April 8, 2018	16

== Season 58: 2018–2019 ==
- Sundays
- Length 1 hour

Title	Broadcast date	Episode
"Equus: Story of the Horse — Origins"	September 23, 2018	1
"Equus: Story of the Horse — First Riders"	September 30, 2018	2
"Equus: Story of the Horse - Chasing the Wind"	October 7, 2018	3
"A Day In The Life of Earth"	October 14, 2018	4
"The Real T.rex"	October 21, 2018	5
"The Memory Mirage"	October 28, 2018	6
"Spying on Animals"	November 4, 2018	7
"The Genetic Revolution"	November 11, 2018	8
"Stay-at-Home Animal Dads"	December 2, 2018	9
"Food for Thought"	December 30, 2018	10
"The Wonder of the Northern Lights"	January 13, 2019	11
"The Power of Play"	January 20, 2019	12
"The Nature of Invention"	January 27, 2019	13
"Something in the Air"	February 17, 2019	14
"Laughing and Crying"	March 3, 2019	15
"Ageing in the Wild"	March 10, 2019	16
"Turtle Beach"	March 17, 2019	17
"Remarkable Rabbits"	April 7, 2019	18

== Season 59: 2019–2020 ==
- Fridays
- Length 1 hour

Title	Broadcast date	Episode
"She Walks with Apes"	September 20, 2019	1
"Grasslands: A Hidden Wilderness"	September 27, 2019	2
"Takaya: Lone Wolf"	October 4, 2019	3
"Living Colour"	October 11, 2019	4
"First Animals"	October 25, 2019	5
"Be Afraid: The Science of Fear"	November 1, 2019	6
"Under Thin Ice"	November 8, 2019	7
"Seals of Sable"	November 15, 2019	8
"Dinosaur Cold Case"	January 10, 2020	9
"Pass the Salt"	January 17, 2020	10
"Nature's Cleanup Crew"	January 31, 2020	11
"Kingdom of the Tide"	February 7, 2020	12
"Accidental Wilderness: The Leslie Street Spit"	February 14, 2020	13
"Listening to Orcas"	February 21, 2020	14
"Aging Well Suzuki Style"	February 28, 2020	15
"Reef Rescue"	March 6, 2020	16
"A Bee's Diary"	March 13, 2020	17

== Season 60: 2020–2021 ==
- Fridays
- Length 1 hour

Title	Broadcast date	Episode
"Rebellion"	November 6, 2020	1
"Kids vs. Screens"	November 13, 2020	2
"Wild Australia: After the Fires"	November 20, 2020	3
"The Covid Cruise"	November 27, 2020	4
"Searching for Cleopatra"	January 8, 2021	5
"Wild Canadian Weather: Cold"	January 15, 2021	6
"Wild Canadian Weather: Rain"	January 22, 2021	7
"Wild Canadian Weather: Wind"	January 29, 2021	8
"Wild Canadian Weather: Sun"	February 5, 2021	9
"Making Wild Canadian Weather"	February 12, 2021	10
"The Real Neanderthal"	February 19, 2021	11
"Kingdom of the Polar Bears: Part 1"	February 26, 2021	12
"Kingdom of the Polar Bears: Part 2"	March 5, 2021	13
"The Last Walrus"	March 12, 2021	14

== Season 61: 2021–2022 ==
- Fridays
- Length 1 hour

Title	Broadcast date	Episode
"Inside The Great Vaccine Race"	November 5, 2021	1
"Nature's Big Year"	November 12, 2021	2
"The Machine That Feels"	November 19, 2021	3
"The New Human"	November 26, 2021	4
"Chef Secrets: The Science of Cooking"	January 6, 2022	5
"Curb Your Carbon"	January 13, 2022	6
"In Your Face"	January 20, 2022	7
"Ice and Fire: Tracking Canada's Climate Crisis"	January 27, 2022	8
"Why We Dance"	February 24, 2022	9
"Carbon: The Unauthorized Biography"	March 3, 2022	10
"How the Wild Things Sleep"	March 10, 2022	11
"The Teenager and the Lost Maya City"	March 17, 2022	12
"The Musical Animal"	March 24, 2022	13
"The Science of Success"	March 31, 2022	14

== Season 62: 2023 ==
- Fridays
- Length 1 hour

Title	Broadcast date	Episode
"Last of the Right Whales"	January 5, 2023	1
"Rat City"	January 12, 2023	2
"Science & Cannabis"	January 19, 2023	3
"Secret Agents of the Underground Railroad"	February 2, 2023	4
"Walking with Ancients"	February 9, 2023	5
"Apocalypse Plan B"	February 16, 2023	6
"True Survivors"	February 23, 2023	7
"Grizzly Rewild"	March 2, 2023	8
"Bug Sex"	March 9, 2023	9
"War for the Woods"	March 16, 2023	10
"The Secrets of Friendship"	March 23, 2023	11
"Woodpeckers: The Hole Story"	March 30, 2023	12
"Suzuki Signs Off"	April 6, 2023	13

== Season 63: 2024 ==
- Thursdays
- Length 1 hour

Title	Broadcast date	Episode
"A User's Guide to the Voice"	January 4, 2024	1
"The Mystery of the Walking Whale"	January 11, 2024	2
"Butt Seriously"	January 18, 2024	3
"Jawsome: Canada's Great White Sharks"	January 25, 2024	4
"I am the Magpie River"	February 1, 2024	5
"Love Hurts: The Science of Heartbreak"	February 8, 2024	6
"Hairy Tales"	March 7, 2024	7
"Little Sapiens"	March 14, 2024	8
"Fluid: Life Beyond the Binary"	March 28, 2024	9
"Secrets of the Jurassic Dinosaurs"	April 4, 2024	10
"Lost World of the Hanging Gardens"	April 11, 2024	11

== Season 64: 2025 ==
- Thursdays
- Length 1 hour

Title	Broadcast date	Episode
"Teenager"	January 2, 2025	1
"Sweat!"	January 9, 2025	2
"Foodspiracy"	January 16, 2025	3
"Shared Planet: Cities"	January 23, 2025	4
"Shared Planet: Open Spaces"	January 30, 2025	5
"Shared Planet: Waters"	February 6, 2025	6
"Shared Planet: Forests"	February 13, 2025	7
"The Secret Knowledge of Animals"	February 20, 2025	8
"Singing Back the Buffalo"	March 6, 2025	9
"Dances with Cranes"	March 13, 2025	10
"Plastic People: The Hidden Crisis of Microplastics"	March 20, 2025	11
"Animal Pride"	May 28, 2025	12
"Dad Bods"	June 5, 2025	13

== See also ==
- List of Equinox episodes
