= Valerie Otero =

American physics educator

Valerie K. Otero is an American physics educator known for her work incorporating trained undergraduate learning assistants into university physics education and studying the effects of doing this on the preparation of future physics teachers. She is a professor of physics education research at the University of Colorado Boulder, executive director of the university's Learning Assistant Program, and co-director of its Center for STEM Learning.

== Education and career ==
Otero grew up in Albuquerque, New Mexico, the daughter of Hispanic grocers without a college education. She majored in physics at the University of New Mexico, graduating in 1991. She earned a master's degree in geophysics from the University of California, San Diego (UCSD) in 1995, and completed her Ph.D. in 2001 in physics education research jointly through UCSD and San Diego State University.

She joined the University of Colorado Boulder as an assistant professor of science education in 2001, was promoted to associate professor in 2008, and promoted to full professor in 2014. She became the co-founder and director of the Colorado Learning Assistant Program in 2003, chair of the Department of Math and Science in the university's School of Education in 2010, executive director of the International Learning Assistant Alliance in 2010, and co-founder and co-director of the Center for STEM Learning in 2013.

== Recognition ==
Otero was a recipient of the 2019 Excellence in Physics Education Award of the American Physical Society (APS). She was named a Fellow of the American Physical Society in 2021, after a nomination from the APS Forum on Education, "for the creation and broad dissemination of innovative physics curricular materials, pioneering contributions to physics teacher education and professional development, and for the development, implementation, and wide dissemination of the Learning Assistant Model across diverse institutions".

She and her colleague Noah Finkelstein were the joint recipients of the 2023 Svend Pedersen Lecture Award of Stockholm University.
