= Noah Finkelstein =

- Born: July 1968 (age 58)
- Education: Yale University (B.S.); Princeton University (PhD)
- Awards: NSF CAREER Award (2005); Boulder Faculty Assembly Award for Excellence in Teaching (2007); Diversity in Excellence Award (2009, 2011); Graduate School Award for Mentoring (2010); Outreach Award (2011, 2012, 2015); President's Teaching Scholar (2012); ΣΠΣ Outstanding Physics Professor (2014); Timmerhaus Teaching Ambassador (2014); Fellow, Am. Assoc. for Advancement of Science (2021)
- Scientific career
- Fields: Physics
- Workplaces: University of California, San Diego; High Tech High Charter School; Center for Astrophysics | Harvard & Smithsonian; University of Colorado Boulder

Noah David Finkelstein (born July 1968) is a professor of physics at the University of Colorado Boulder. He is a founding co-director of the Colorado Center for STEM Learning, a President’s Teaching Scholar, and the inaugural Timmerhaus Teaching Ambassador. His research focuses on physics education and on developing models of context, the scope of which involves students, departments, and institutional scales of transformation. In 2010, Finkelstein testified to the United States House Committee on Science, Space and Technology on how to strengthen undergraduate and postgraduate STEM education.

== Education ==
Finkelstein graduated at Yale University with a magna cum laude degree in mathematics in 1990. He obtained a Ph.D. in applied physics from the Department of Mechanical and Aerospace Engineering at Princeton University in 1998.

== Career ==
Finkelstein was a postdoctoral fellow in physics education research under Professor Michael Cole at the University of California, San Diego, and under Professor Andrea diSessa at the University of California, Berkeley (1998–2001). He was a research fellow at the Laboratory of Comparative Human Cognition, a lecturer in physics and in teacher education (1999–2002), and a physics teacher at High Tech High School (2002–2003). Finkelstein served as a research consultant at the Center for Astrophysics | Harvard & Smithsonian (2002–2004). In 2003, Finkelstein joined the University of Colorado Boulder as an assistant professor of physics. He was promoted to associate professor in 2008 and to full professor in 2012. Finkelstein is a technical advisor at the Association of American Universities Education Initiative, a founding board member of the PER Topical Group, and a trustee of the Higher Learning Commission. He was elected fellow of American Physical Society in 2011 and the American Association for the Advancement of Science in 2021. His primary focus is in physics education research.

== Personal life ==
Finkelstein’s mother Edith B. Gelles is a senior scholar of gender studies at Stanford University. His father is professor emeritus of mathematics at UC Irvine, and his brother Adam is a professor of computer science at Princeton University.

== See also ==
- American Association of Physics Teachers
- American Physical Society
- Learning Assistant Model
- PhET Interactive Simulations
- Physics education
