= Steven Pollock =

American professor of physics

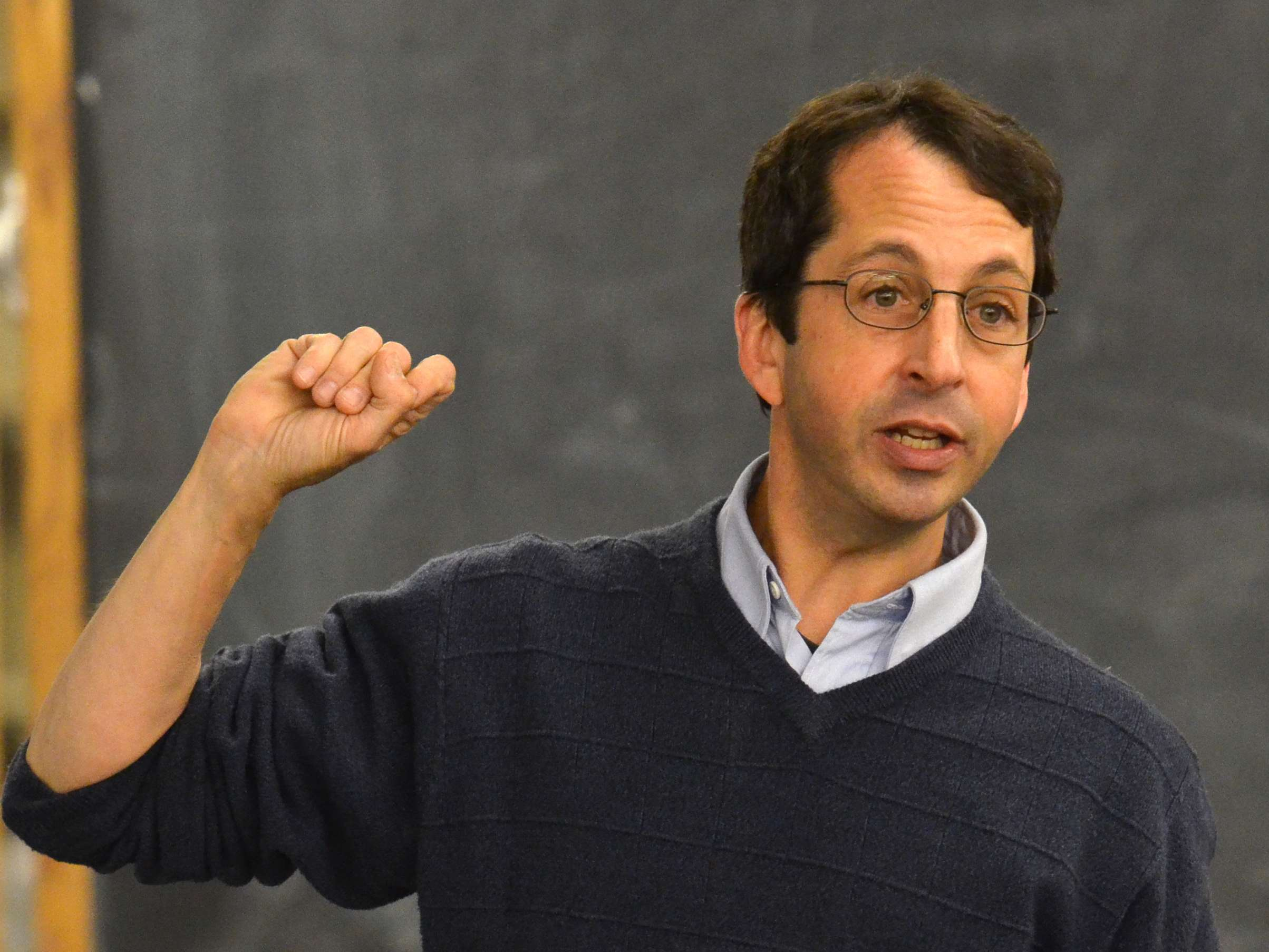
- Steven Pollock in 2013
- Education: Massachusetts Institute of Technology; Stanford University
- Awards: Alfred P. Sloan Research Fellow (1994); Junior Faculty Development Award (1994); Boulder Faculty Assembly Teaching Excellence (1998); Pew-Carnegie National Teaching Scholar (2001); Best Should Teach Award (2006); President's Teaching Scholar (2008); Chancellor’s Award for Excellence in STEM Education, Innovation and Research (2009); U.S. Professor of the Year (2013)
- Scientific career
- Fields: Physics
- Workplaces: Nationaal instituut voor subatomaire fysica, Amsterdam; University of Washington; University of Colorado Boulder
- Doctoral advisor: John Dirk Walecka

Steven J. Pollock is an American professor of physics and a President's Teaching Scholar at the University of Colorado Boulder, where he has taught since 1993. His specialisations are in physics education research and in nuclear theory. He is the 2013 U.S. Professor of the Year.

== Early life and education ==
Pollock sat for an Sc.B. in physics at the Massachusetts Institute of Technology in 1982 and for an M.S. and Ph.D. in physics at Stanford University respectively in 1984 and 1987 for his thesis, entitled Electroweak Interactions in the Nuclear Domain, under Professor John Dirk Walecka.

== Career ==
He was a postdoctoral fellow in nuclear physics at the Nationaal instituut voor subatomaire fysica (NIKHEF), Amsterdam, from 1988 to 1990, and at the University of Washington's Institute for Nuclear Theory from 1990 to 1992. In 1993 he became a senior scientist at NIKHEF before joining the University of Colorado at Boulder as an assistant professor, where he was promoted to associate professor in 2000 and to full professor in 2009. In the early aughts (2000s) he shifted his primary focus to physics education research. In 2003 he co-founded the learning assistant programme.

=== Research ===
Pollock investigates and develops curricular and pedagogical reforms and assessments in upper-division physics courses. He investigates impacts of established reforms in large lecture introductory courses, including the use of "Tutorials in introductory physics", with graduate TA training, and use of undergraduate learning assistants. He has advised four graduate students and eight postdoctoral fellows in nuclear physics and in physics education research.

== Bibliography ==
=== Books ===
- Particle Physics for Non-physicists: a Tour of the Microcosmos (2003). The Teaching Company. ISBN 1565856244.
- Physics 1 (2001). Thinkwell. ASIN 1605380261.
- Great Ideas of Classical Physics (2006). The Teaching Company. ISBN 1598032550.

== See also ==
- American Association of Physics Teachers
- Carnegie Foundation for the Advancement of Teaching
- Learning Assistant Model
- Nuclear physics
- Physics education research
- Science education
