= Physics education =

Set of methods to teach physics

An Atwood's machine is a machine consisting of a pulley and two masses that is commonly used in physics classrooms to demonstrate Newton's laws of motion.

Physics education or physics teaching refers to the education methods currently used to teach physics. The occupation is called physics educator or physics teacher. Physics education research refers to an area of pedagogical research that seeks to improve those methods. Historically, physics has been taught at the high school and college level primarily by the lecture method together with laboratory exercises aimed at verifying concepts taught in the lectures. These concepts are better understood when lectures are accompanied with demonstration, hand-on experiments, and questions that require students to ponder what will happen in an experiment and why. Students who participate in active learning for example with hands-on experiments learn through self-discovery. By trial and error they learn to change their preconceptions about phenomena in physics and discover the underlying concepts. Physics education is part of the broader area of science education.

== History ==
In Ancient Greece, Aristotle wrote what is considered now as the first textbook of physics. Aristotle's ideas were taught unchanged until the Late Middle Ages, when scientists started making discoveries that didn't fit them. For example, Copernicus' discovery contradicted Aristotle's idea of an Earth-centric universe. Aristotle's ideas about motion weren't displaced until the end of the 17th century, when Newton published his ideas.

Today's physics students often think of physics concepts in Aristotelian terms, despite being taught only Newtonian concepts.

== Teaching strategies ==
Teaching strategies are the various techniques used to facilitate the education of students with different learning styles. The different teaching strategies are intended to help students develop critical thinking and engage with the material. The choice of teaching strategy depends on the concept being taught, and indeed on the interest of the students.

Methods/Approaches for teaching physics

- Lecture: Lecturing is one of the more traditional ways of teaching science. Owing to the convenience of this method, and the fact that most teachers are taught by it, it remains popular in spite of certain limitations (compared to other methods, it does little to develop critical thinking and scientific attitude among students). This method is teacher centric.
- Recitation: Also known as the Socratic method. In this method, the student plays a greater role than they would in a lecture. The teacher asks questions with the aim of prompting the thoughts of the students. This method can be very effective in developing higher order thinking in pupils. To apply this strategy, the students should be partially informed about the content. The efficacy of the recitation method depends largely on the quality of the questions. This method is student centric.
- Demonstration: In this method, the teacher performs certain experiments, which students observe and ask questions about. After the demonstration, the teacher can explain the experiment further and test the students' understanding via questions. This method is an important one, as science is not an entirely theoretical subject.
- Lecture-cum-Demonstration: As its name suggests, this is a combination of two of the above methods: lecture and demonstration. The teacher performs the experiment and explains it simultaneously. By this method, the teacher can provide more information in less time. As with the demonstration method, the students only observe; they do not get any practical experience of their own. It is not possible to teach all topics by this method.
- Laboratory Activities: Laboratories have students conduct physics experiments and collect data by interacting with physics equipment. Generally, students follow instructions in a lab manual. These instructions often take students through an experiment step-by-step. Typical learning objectives include reinforcing the course content through real-world interaction (similar to demonstrations) and thinking like experimental physicists. Lately, there has been some effort to shift lab activities toward the latter objective by separating from the course content, having students make their own decisions, and calling to question the notion of a "correct" experimental result. Unlike the demonstration method, the laboratory method gives students practical experience performing experiments like professional scientists. However, it often requires a significant amount of time and resources to work properly.
- Problem-based learning: A group of 8-10 students and a tutor meet together to study a "case" or trigger problem. One student acts as a chair and one as a scribe to record the session. Students interact to understand the terminology and issues of the problem, discussing possible solutions and a set of learning objectives. The group breaks up for private study then return to share results. The approach has been used in many UK medical schools. The technique fosters independence, engagement, development of communication skill, and integration of new knowledge with real world issues. However, the technique requires more staff per student, staff willing to facilitate rather than lecture, and well designed and documented trigger scenarios. The technique has been shown to be effective in teaching physics.

== Research ==
Number of Publications on Students' Ideas on the Bibliography by Duit (2005)
Fragment	Publication
Mechanics (force)*	792
Electricity (electrical circuit)	444
Optics	234
Particle model	226
Thermal physics (heat/temp.)	192
Energy	176
Astronomy (Earth in space)	121
Quantum physics	77
Nonlinear systems (chaos)	35
Sound	28
Magnetism	25
Relativity	8
* Predominant concept in brackets. Adapted from Duit, R., H. Niedderer and H. Schecker (see ref.).

Physics education research is the study of how physics is taught and how students learn physics. It a subfield of educational research.

== Worldwide ==
- Physics education in Hong Kong
- Physics education in the United Kingdom

== See also ==
- American Association of Physics Teachers
- Balsa wood bridge
- Concept inventory
- Egg drop competition
- Feynman lectures
- Harvard Project Physics
- Learning Assistant Model
- List of physics concepts in primary and secondary education curricula
- Mousetrap car
- Physical Science Study Committee
- Physics First
- SAT Subject Test in Physics
- Physics Outreach
- Science education
- Teaching quantum mechanics
- Mathematics education
- Engineering education
- Discipline-based education research
