= Build a better mousetrap, and the world will beat a path to your door =

Phrase about innovation

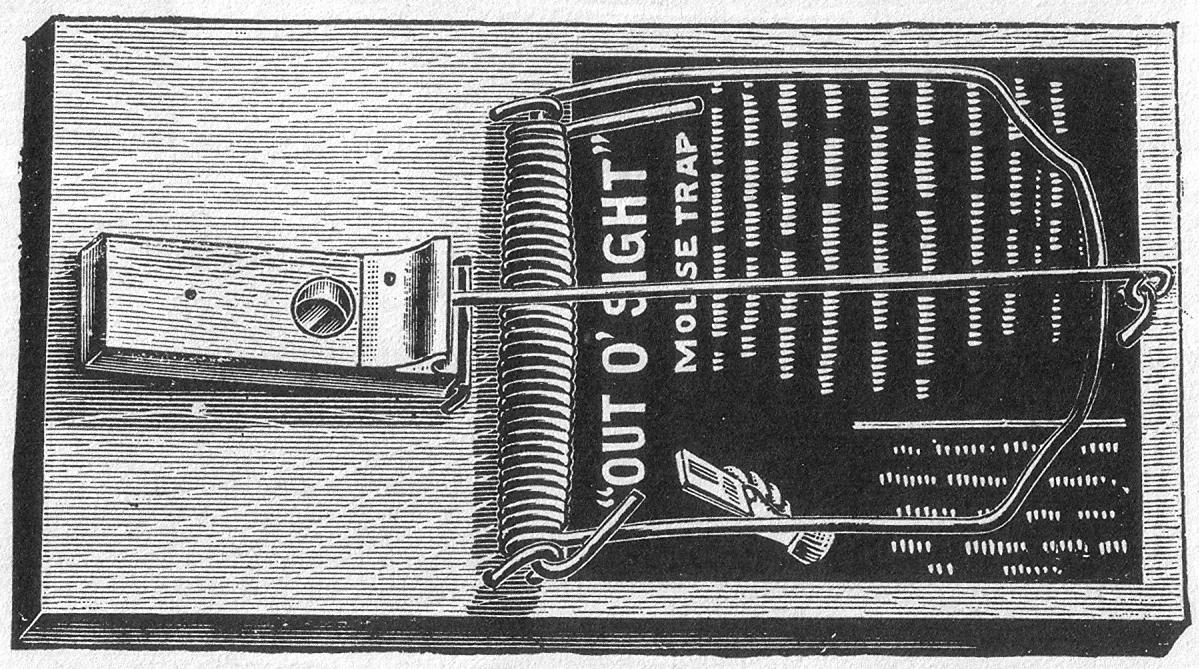
A spring-loaded mousetrap as patented and advertised several years after the phrase became popular

"Build a better mousetrap, and the world will beat a path to your door" is a metaphor about the power of innovation. It originated, in a somewhat different form, with Ralph Waldo Emerson. The epigram as known today, which specifies "mousetrap", probably also originated with Emerson, although the evidence for this is indirect.

== Origin ==
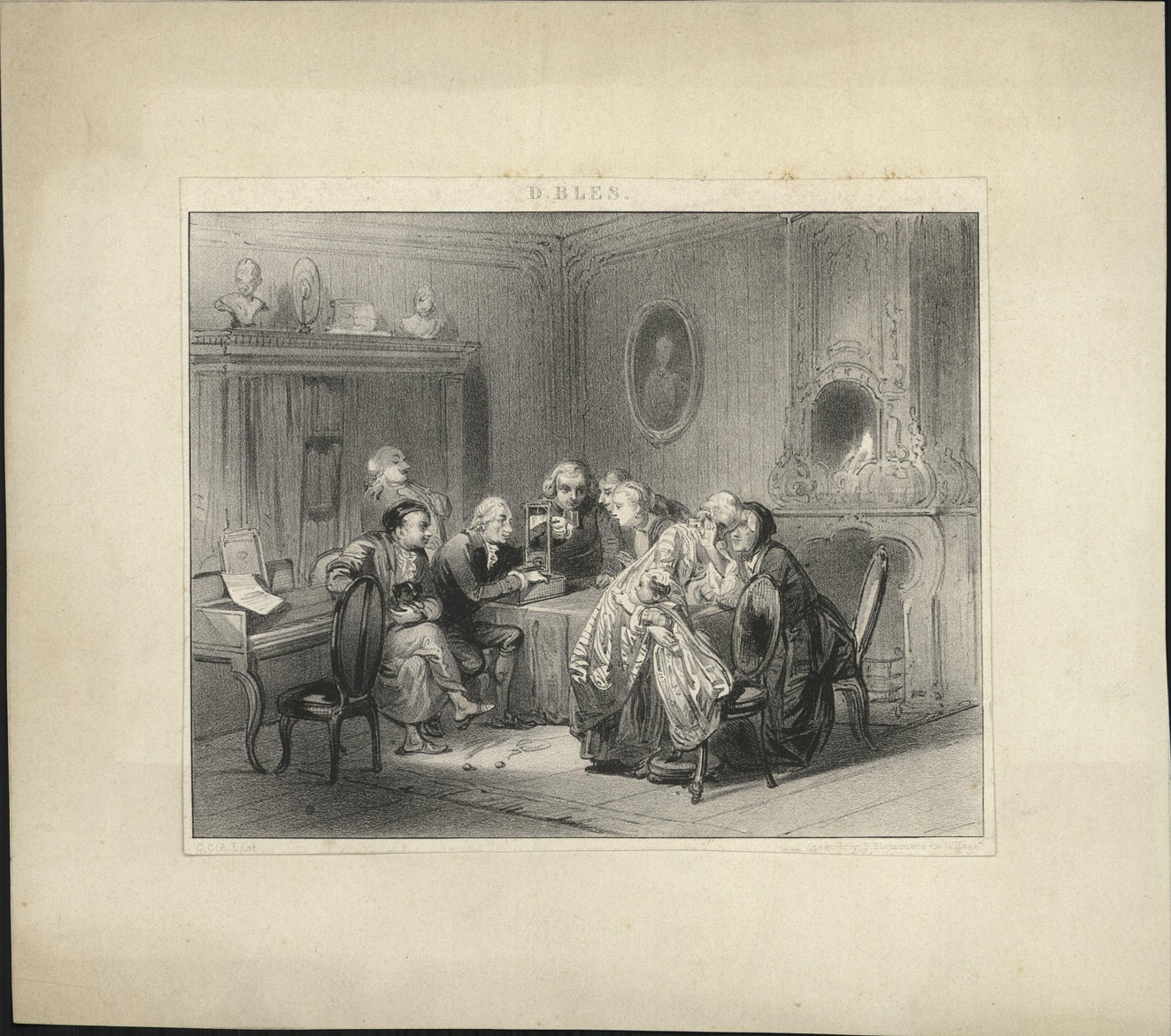
Image of a guillotine-style mousetrap seller in the mid-19th century

In February 1855, Emerson wrote in his journal, under the heading "Common Fame":

If a man has good corn or wood, or boards, or pigs, to sell, or can make better chairs or knives, crucibles or church organs, than anybody else, you will find a broad hard-beaten road to his house, though it be in the woods.

In May 1882, a month after his death, the following quotation was attributed (with no date or source) to Emerson by The Cincinnati Enquirer under the heading "The Value of Good Work":

If a man can write a better book, preach a better sermon or make a better mouse-trap than his neighbors, though he builds his house in the woods, the world will make a beaten path to his door.

Researchers believe it likely that Emerson used a modified version of the theme from his journal in a lecture given at some point after 1855, with the word "mouse-trap" inserted in place of one of the other example products.

== Meaning ==
The phrase has become an axiom for the power of successful innovation. Statistics suggest that it is frequently taken literally, with more than 4,400 patents issued by the United States Patent and Trademark Office for new mousetraps, with thousands more unsuccessful applicants, making them the "most frequently invented device in U.S. history". The popular modern snap-trap version of the mousetrap was invented by William C. Hooker in 1894 and improved by John Mast in 1899, during the period that the "better-mousetrap" epigram was becoming popular.
