= Physics education in Hong Kong =

Physics education in Hong Kong is carried out both at secondary schools and universities.

== Secondary schools ==
In Hong Kong, physics is a subject for public examination. Local students take the Hong Kong Diploma of Secondary Education (HKDSE) in form 6.

Compared with the other syllabi including GCSE, GCE etc. which cover a wider variety of topics, the Hong Kong syllabus is conceptually deeper, and includes more challenging calculations. It covers fewer topics than A-level due to the insufficient teaching hours available at Hong Kong secondary schools. These topics include temperature, heat, internal energy, change of state, gases, position, motion, force, projectile motion, work, energy, power, momentum, uniform circular motion, gravitation, wave, light, sound, electrostatics, circuits, electromagnetism, radiation, radioactivity, atomic model, nuclear energy, universe, astronomy, stars, Rutherford model, photoelectric effect, Bohr model, particles, nanoscopic scale, building, transportation, renewable energy sources, eye, ear, non-ionizing radiation and ionizing radiation etc.

Some schools allow students to choose physics as an elective only from Form 4, while others provide a compulsory curriculum of physics in Form 3 before offering it as an elective in Form 4, while some offer it as an elective since Form 3. Most schools use English as the medium of instruction for physics, although some use Chinese.

In addition classroom and laboratory lessons, schools in Hong Kong organise activities outside school to motivate students to study physics.

== Universities ==
Pure Physics major programmes are provided in the Chinese University of Hong Kong (CUHK), Hong Kong University of Science and Technology (HKUST) and University of Hong Kong (HKU). Their topics include engineering physics, mechanics, thermodynamics, fluids, wave, optics, modern physics, laboratory, heat, electromagnetism, quantitative methods, computational physics, astronomy, astrophysics, classical mechanics, quantum mechanics, quantum information, statistical physics, theoretical physics, computer simulation, soft matter, practical electronics, contemporary physics, instrumentation, statistical mechanics, solid state physics, meteorology, nanoscience, optical physics, theory of relativity and particle physics etc.

There are different approaches in delivering physics lectures for universities in Hong Kong. In CUHK, topics such as quantitative methods and computer simulation are taught in the Department of Physics, enabling students to gain a deeper understanding of the physics, which can be applied to solve various different problems, whereas in HKUST, quantitative methods and computer simulation are used in courses delivered by Department of Mathematics and Department of Computer Science respectively which allows students to diversify their learning with knowledge from different fields.

CUHK offers an Enrichment Stream in Theoretical Physics while HKUST offers an International Research Enrichment Track. These programmes cover additional topics including astrophysics, particle physics, computational physics, and quantum physics. They provide in-depth study of theoretical problem-solving and physical concepts, which allows graduates to gain a high level of the understanding of physics. However, the working opportunity for graduates with a theoretical physics background in Hong Kong is too narrow. Most graduates pursue further studies overseas or become teachers.

Moreover, Applied Physics major programmes are also offered at universities in Hong Kong.
