= Physics education research =

Type of education research

Physics education research (PER) is a form of discipline-based education research specifically related to the study of the teaching and learning of physics, often with the aim of improving the effectiveness of student learning. PER draws from other disciplines, such as sociology, cognitive science, education and linguistics, and complements them by reflecting the disciplinary knowledge and practices of physics. Approximately eighty-five institutions in the United States conduct research in science and physics education.

== Goals ==
Number of Publications on Students' Ideas on the Bibliography by Duit (2005)
Fragment	Publication
Mechanics (force)*	792
Electricity (electrical circuit)	444
Optics	234
Particle model	226
Thermal physics (heat/temp.)	192
Energy	176
Astronomy (Earth in space)	121
Quantum physics	77
Nonlinear systems (chaos)	35
Sound	28
Magnetism	25
Relativity	8
* Predominant concept in brackets. Adapted from Duit, R., H. Niedderer and H. Schecker (see ref.).

One primary goal of PER is to develop pedagogical techniques and strategies that will help students learn physics more effectively and help instructors to implement these techniques. Because even basic ideas in physics can be confusing, together with the possibility of scientific misconceptions formed from teaching through analogies, lecturing often does not erase common misconceptions about physics that students acquire before they are taught physics. Research often focuses on learning more about common misconceptions that students bring to the physics classroom so that techniques can be devised to help students overcome these misconceptions.

In most introductory physics courses, mechanics is usually the first area of physics that is taught. Newton's laws of motion about interactions between forces and objects are central to the study of mechanics. Many students hold the Aristotelian misconception that a net force is required to keep a body moving; instead, motion is modeled in modern physics with Newton's first law of inertia, stating that a body will keep its state of rest or movement unless a net force acts on the body. Like students who hold this misconception, Newton arrived at his three laws of motion through empirical analysis, although he did it with an extensive study of data that included astronomical observations. Students can erase such as misconception in a nearly frictionless environment, where they find that objects move at an almost constant velocity without a constant force.

== Major areas ==
The broad goal of the PER community is to understand the processes involved in the teaching and learning of physics through rigorous scientific investigation.

According to the University of Washington PER group, one of the pioneers in the field, work within PER tends to fall within one or more of several broad descriptions, including:

- Identifying student difficulties
- Developing methods to address these difficulties and measure learning gains
- Developing surveys to measure student performance and other characteristics
- Investigating student attitudes and beliefs as relating to physics
- Studying small and large group dynamics analyzing student patterns using framing and other new and existing epistemological methods

"An Introduction to Physics Education Research", by Robert Beichner, identifies eight trends in PER:

- Conceptual understanding: Investigating what students know and how they learn it is a centerpiece of PER. Early research involved identifying and treating misconceptions about the principles of physics. The term has since evolved to "student difficulties" based on the consideration of alternative theoretical frameworks for student learning. A difficulty with a concept can be built into a correct concept; a misconception is rooted out and replaced by a correct conception. The PER group at the University of Washington specializes in research about conceptual understanding and student difficulty.
- Epistemology: PER began as a trial-and-error approach to improve learning. Because of the downsides of such an approach, theoretical bases for research were developed early on, most notably through the University of Maryland. The theoretical underpinnings of PER are mostly built around Piagettean constructivism. Theories on cognition in physics learning were put forward by Redish, Hammer, Elby and Scherr, who built off of diSessa's "Knowledge in Pieces". The Resources Framework, developed from this work, builds off of research in neuroscience, sociology, linguistics, education and psychology. Additional frameworks are forthcoming, most recently the "Possibilities Framework", which builds off of deductive reasoning research started by Wason and Philip Johnson-Laird.
- Problem solving: It plays an important role in the processes that advance physics research, featured in high numbers of exercises in conventional textbooks. Most research in this area rests on examining the difference between novice and expert problem solvers (freshmen and sophomores, and graduate-level and postdoctorate students, respectively). Approaches in researching problem solving have been a focus for the University of Minnesota's PER group. Recently, a paper was published in PRL Special Section: PER that identified over 30 behaviors, attitudes, and skills that are used in the solving of a typical physics problem. Greater resolution and specific attention to the details are used in the field of problem solving.
- Attitudes: The University of Colorado developed an instrument that reveals student attitudes and expectations about physics as a subject and as a class. Student attitudes are often found to decline after traditional instruction, but recent work by Redish and Hammer show that this can be reversed and positive attitudinal gains can be seen if attention is paid to "explicate the epistemological elements of the implicit curriculum."
- Social aspects: Research has been conducted into gender, race, and other socioeconomic issues that can influence learning in physics and other fields. Other research has investigated the impacts on learning physics of body language, group dynamics, and classroom setup.
- Technology: Student response systems (clickers) are based on Eric Mazur's work in Peer Instruction. Research in PER examines the influence, applications of, and possibilities for technology in the classroom.
- Instructional interventions: PER's curriculum design is based on more than two decades of research in physics education. Notable textbooks include Tutorials in Physics, Physics by Inquiry, Investigative Science Learning Environment, and Paradigms in Physics, as well as many new textbooks in introductory and junior level coursework. The Kansas State University Physics Education Research Group has developed a program, Visual Quantum Mechanics (VQM), to teach quantum mechanics to high school and college students who do not have advanced backgrounds in physics or math.
- Instructional materials: For undergraduates, publishers now emphasize a PER basis for their physics textbooks as a major selling point. One of the earliest comprehensive physics textbooks to incorporate PER findings was written by Serway and Beichner. Apart from textbooks, instructional material for pre-college physics students now include PhET (Physics Education Technology) simulations. This is made possible through advances in personal computer hardware, platform-independent software such as Adobe Flash Player and Java, and more recently HTML5, CSS3 and JavaScript. According to Wieman, PhET simulations offer a direct and powerful tool for probing student thinking and learning.

== Journal association ==
Physics education research papers in the United States are primarily issued among four publishing venues. Papers submitted to the American Journal of Physics: Physics Education Research Section (PERS) are mostly to consumers of physics education research. The Journal of the Learning Sciences (JLS) publishes papers that regard real-life or non-laboratory environments, often in the context of technology, and are about learning, not teaching. Meanwhile, papers at Physical Review Special Topics: Physics Education Research (PRST:PER) are aimed at those for whom research is conducted on PER rather than to consumers. The audience for Physics Education Research Conference Proceedings (PERC) is designed for a mix of consumers and researchers. The latter provides a snapshot of the field and as such is open to preliminary results and research in progress, as well as papers that would simply be thought-provoking to the PER community. Other journals include Physics Education (UK), the European Journal of Physics (UK), and The Physics Teacher. Leon Hsu and others published an article about publishing and refereeing papers in physics education research in 2007.

== See also ==
- Teaching quantum mechanics
