= Mousetrap =

Animal trap used to catch and kill mice

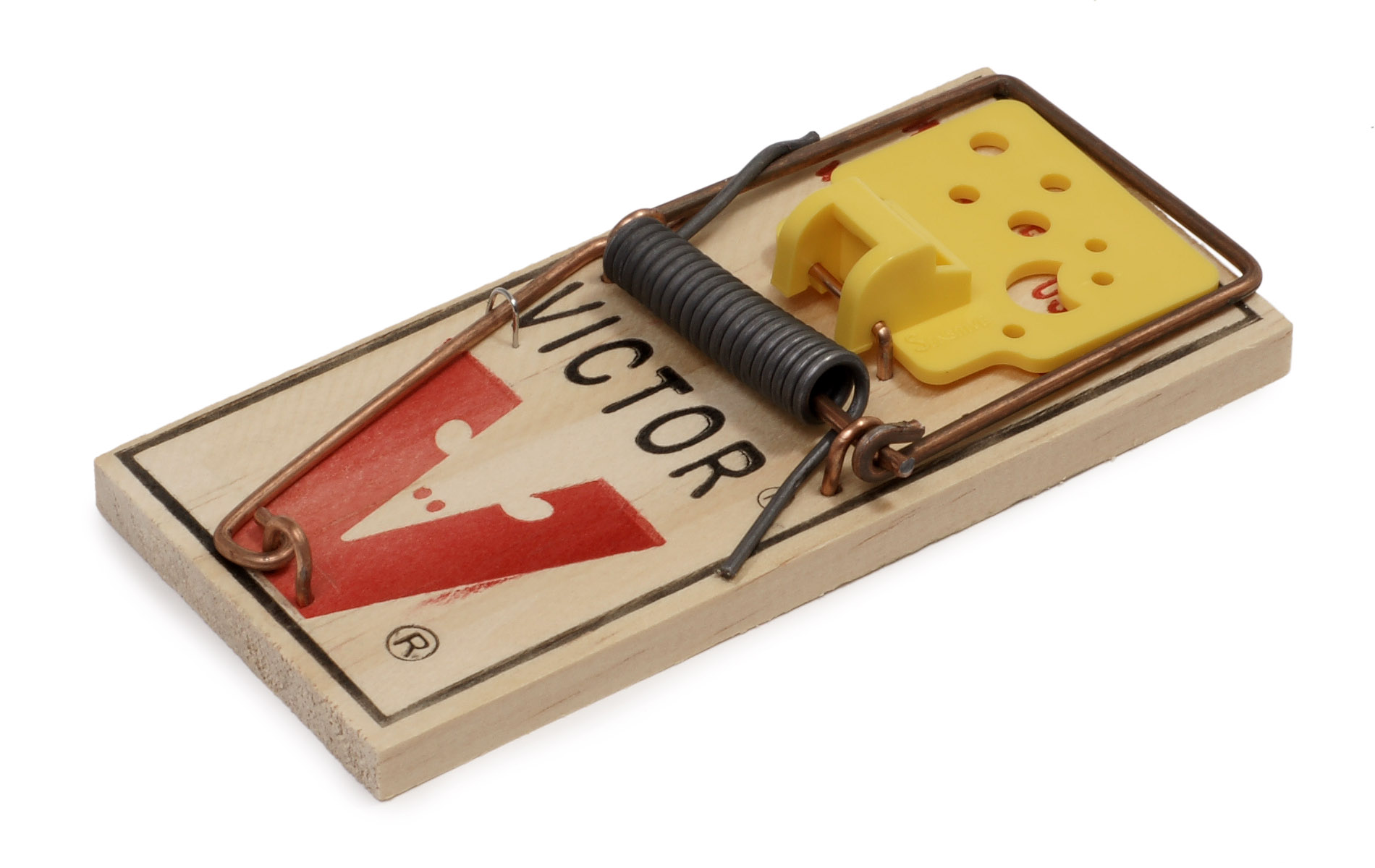
A spring mousetrap by Victor

Triggering a mousetrap

A mousetrap is a specialized type of animal trap designed primarily to catch and, usually, kill mice. Mousetraps are usually set in an indoor location where there is a suspected infestation of rodents. Larger traps are designed to catch other species of animals, such as rats, squirrels, and other small rodents. Trap types differ significantly in effectiveness, potential harm to wildlife and pets, and the level of suffering caused, with some raising serious welfare and environmental concerns.

== Types ==
=== Jaw mousetrap ===
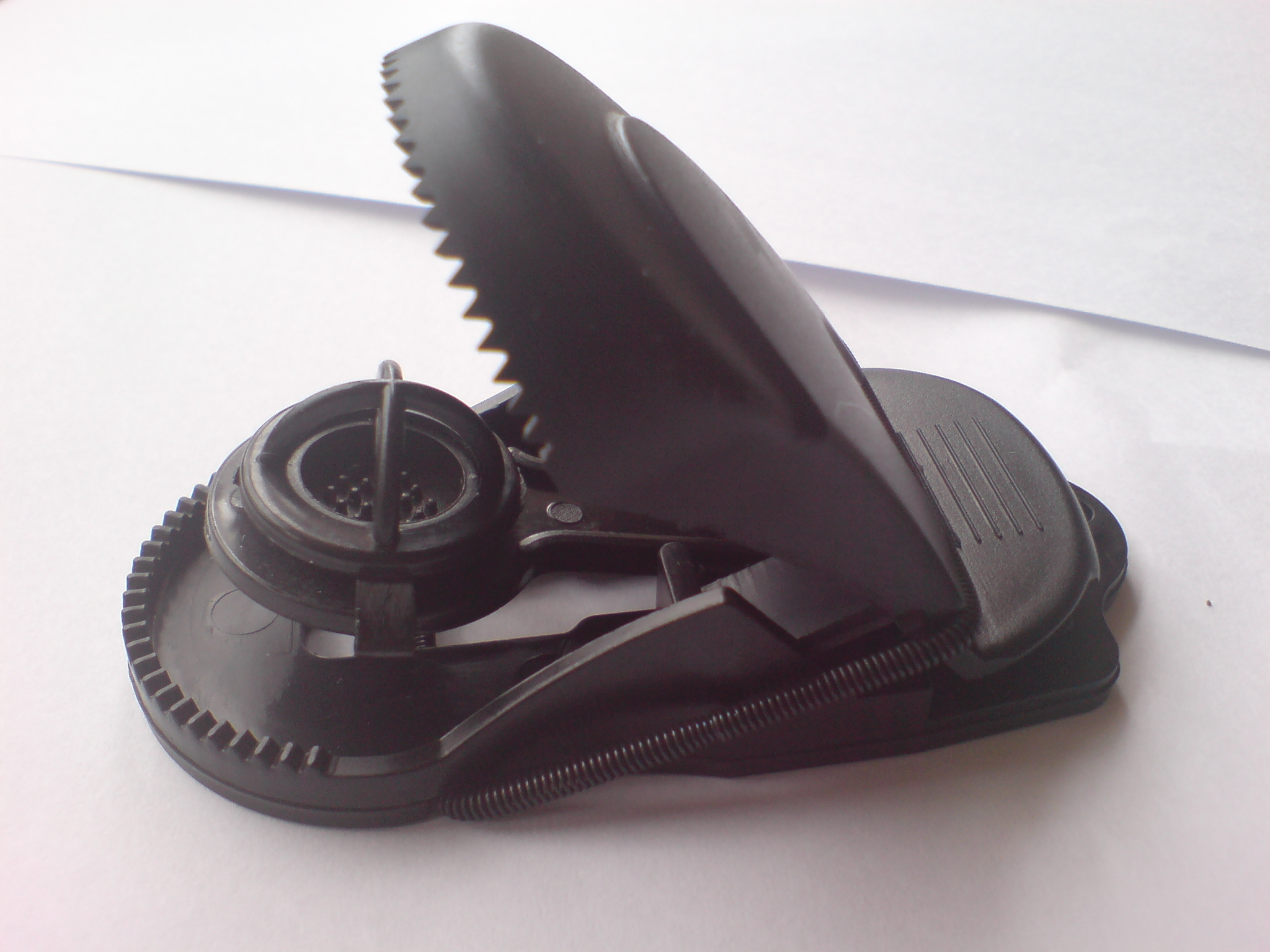
A mouth-type mousetrap

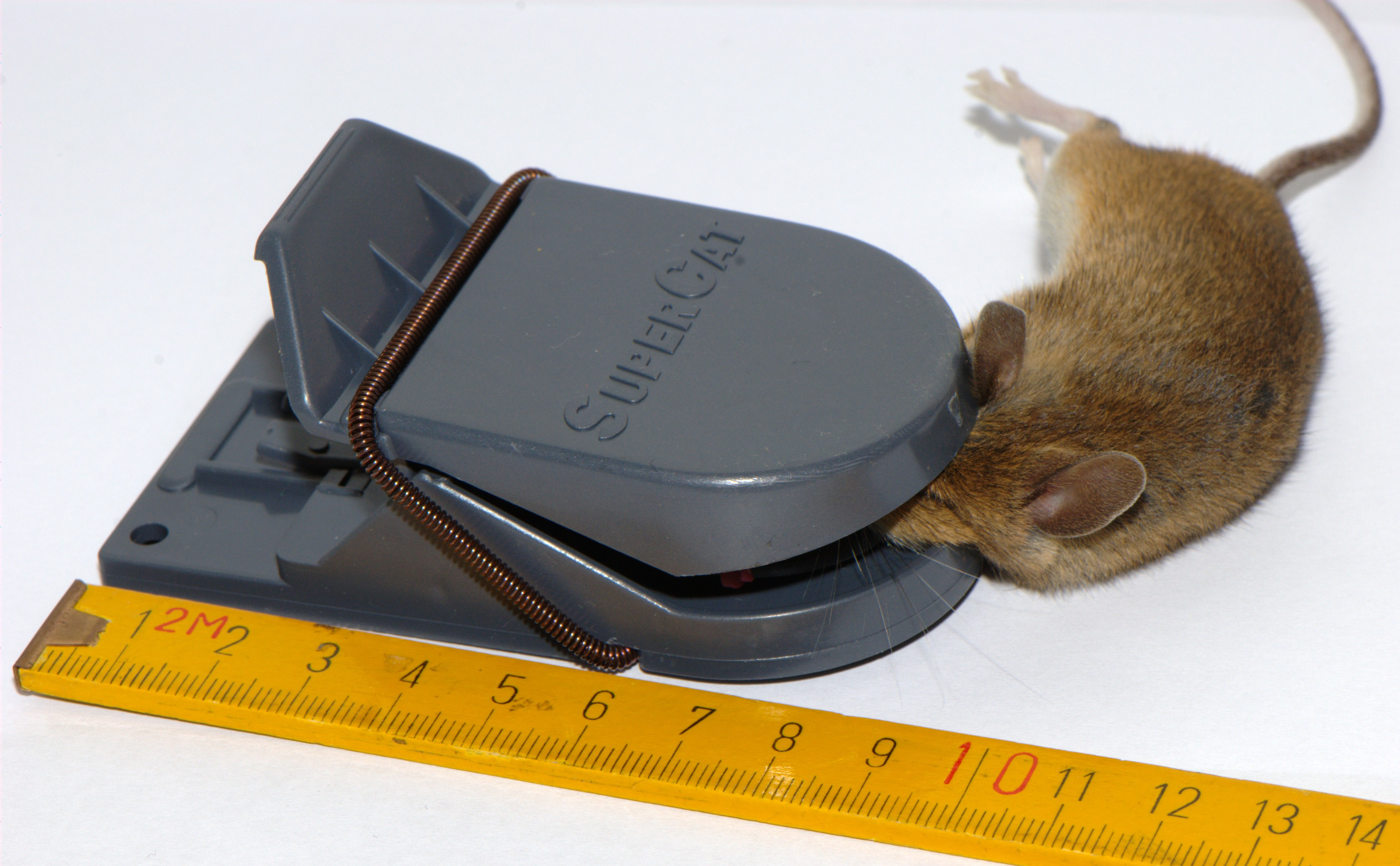
Mousetrap made of plastic with house mouse

The trap that is credited as the first patented lethal mousetrap was a set of spring-loaded, cast-iron jaws dubbed "Royal No. 1". It was patented on 4 November 1879 by James M. Keep of New York, US patent 221,320. From the patent description, it is clear that this is not the first mousetrap of this type, but the patent is for this simplified, easy-to-manufacture design. It is the industrial-age development of the deadfall trap, but relying on the force of a wound spring rather than gravity.

The jaws are operated by a coiled spring, and the triggering mechanism is between the jaws, where the bait is held. The trip snaps the jaws shut, killing the rodent.

Lightweight traps of this style are now constructed from plastic. These traps do not have a powerful snap like other types. They are safer for the fingers of the person setting them than other lethal traps, and can be set with the press on a tab by a single finger or even by foot.

=== Spring-loaded bar mousetrap ===
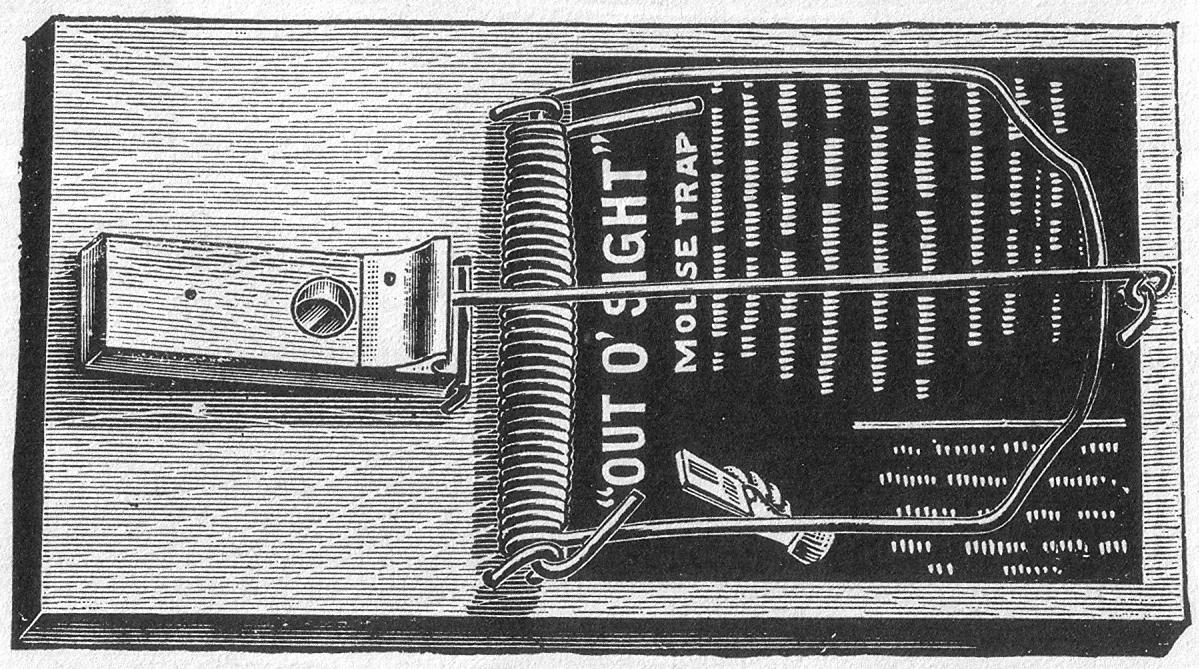
19th-century ad for a spring-loaded bar mousetrap of William Hooker's design

The spring-loaded mousetrap was first patented by William C. Hooker of Abingdon, Illinois, who received US patent 528671 for his design in 1894. A British inventor, James Henry Atkinson, patented a similar trap called the "Little Nipper" in 1898, including variations still produced under that name that had a weight-activated treadle as the trip.

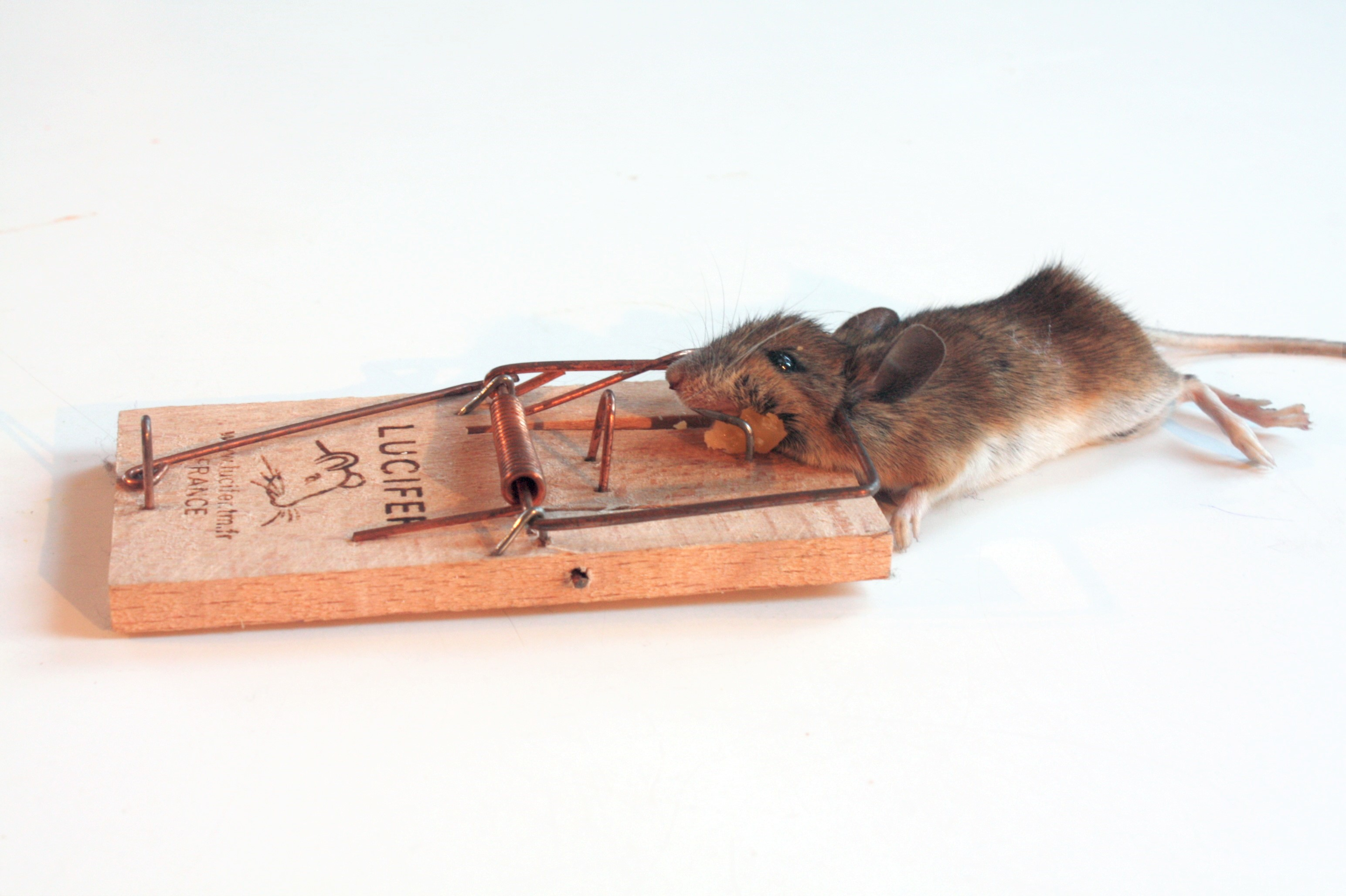
Trapped deer mouse in spring-loaded bar trap

In 1899, Atkinson patented a modification of his earlier design that transformed it from a trap that goes off by a step on the treadle into one that goes off by a pull on the bait. The similarity of the latter design with Hooker's of 1894 may have contributed to a common mistake of giving priority to Atkinson.

It is a simple device with a heavily spring-loaded bar and a trip to release it. Cheese may be placed on the trip as bait, but other food such as oats, chocolate, bread, meat, butter and peanut butter are also used. The spring-loaded bar swings down rapidly and with great force when anything, usually a mouse, touches the trip. The design is such that the mouse's neck or spinal cord will be broken, or its ribs or skull crushed, by the force of the bar. The trap can be held over a bin and the dead mouse released into it by pulling the bar. In the case of rats, which are much larger than mice, a much larger version of the same type of trap is used to kill them. Some spring mousetraps have a plastic extended trip. The larger trip has two notable differences over the smaller traditional type: increased leverage, which requires less force from the rodent to trip it; and the larger surface area of the trip increases the probability that the rodent will set off the trap. The exact latching mechanism holding the trip varies, and some need to be set right at the edge in order to be sensitive enough to catch the mouse.

In 1899, John Mast of Lititz, Pennsylvania, filed a U.S. patent for a modification of Hooker's design that can be "readily set or adjusted with absolute safety to the person attending thereto, avoiding the liability of having his fingers caught or injured by the striker when it is prematurely or accidentally freed or released." He obtained the patent on 17 November 1903. After William Hooker had sold his interest in the Animal Trap Company of Abingdon, Illinois, and founded the new Abingdon Trap Company in 1899, the Animal Trap Company moved to Lititz, Pennsylvania, and fused with the J.M. Mast Manufacturing Company in 1905. The new and bigger company in Lititz retained the name Animal Trap Company. Compounding these different but related patents and companies may have contributed to the widespread mis-attribution of priority to Mast rather than Hooker.

=== Electric mousetrap ===
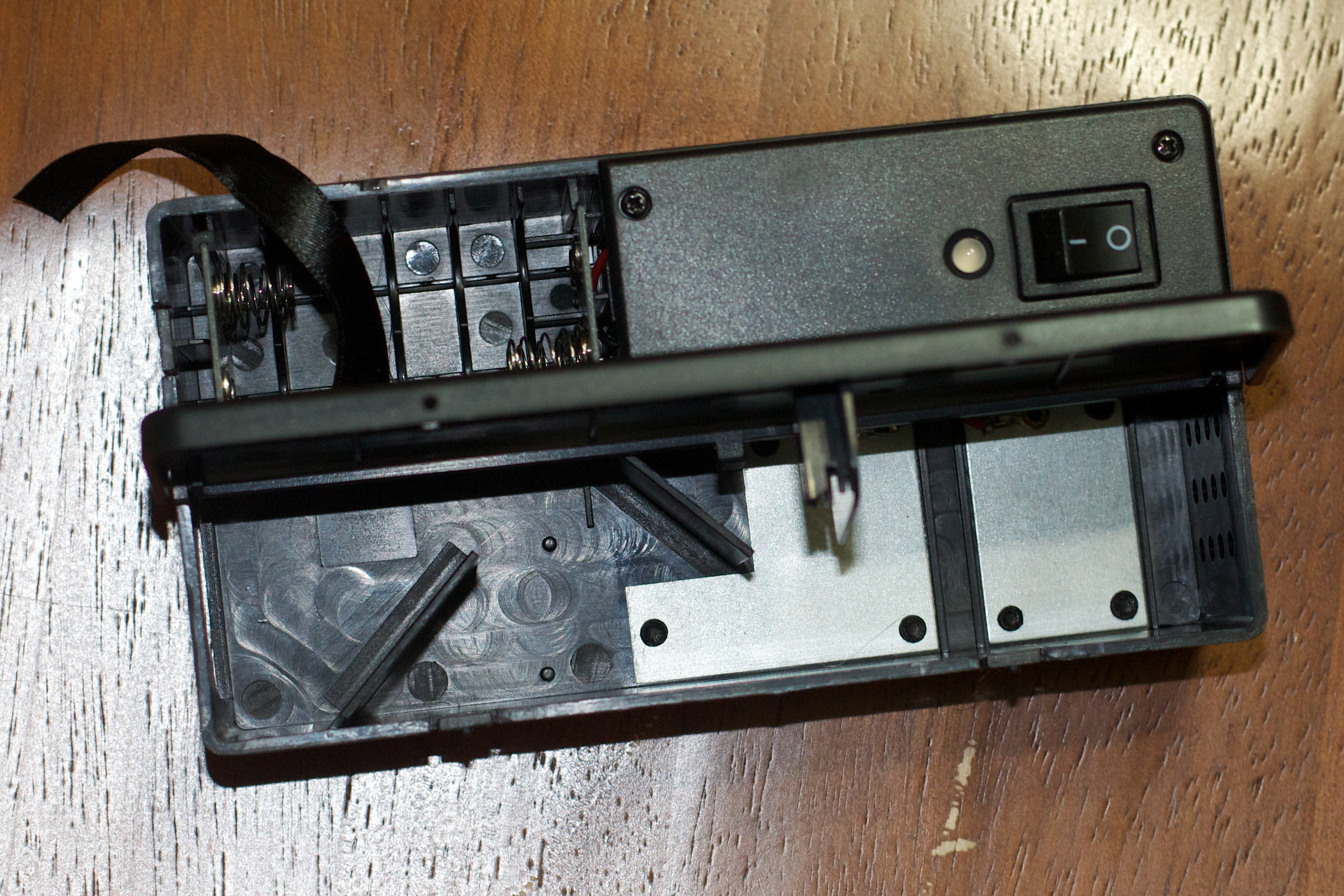
A Victor-brand electronic mousetrap

An electric mousetrap delivers a lethal dose of electricity when the rodent completes the circuit by contacting two electrodes located either at the entrance or between the entrance and the bait. The electrodes are housed in an insulated or plastic box to prevent accidental injury to humans and pets. They can be designed for single-catch domestic use or large multiple-catch commercial use. See U.S. patent 4,250,655 and U.S. patent 4,780,985.

=== Live-capture mousetrap ===
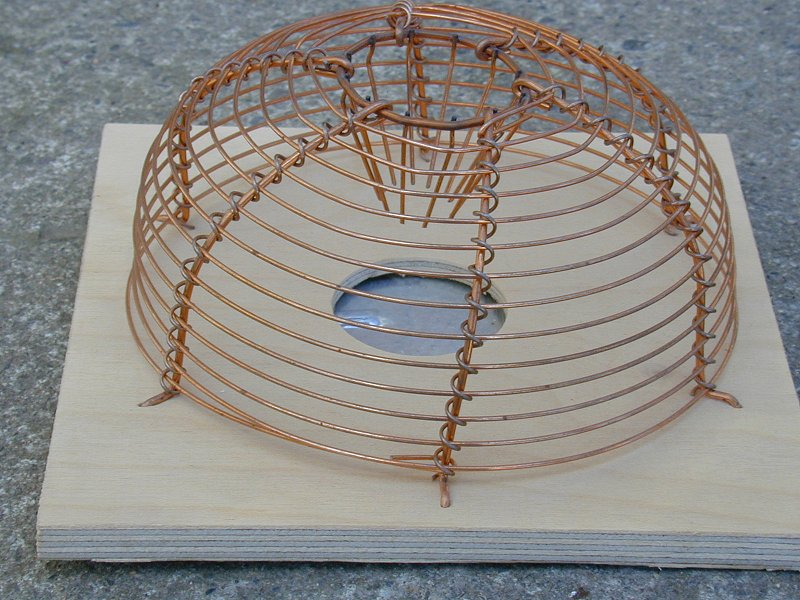
Uninjured mice can be released from a live-catch mousetrap, pictured.

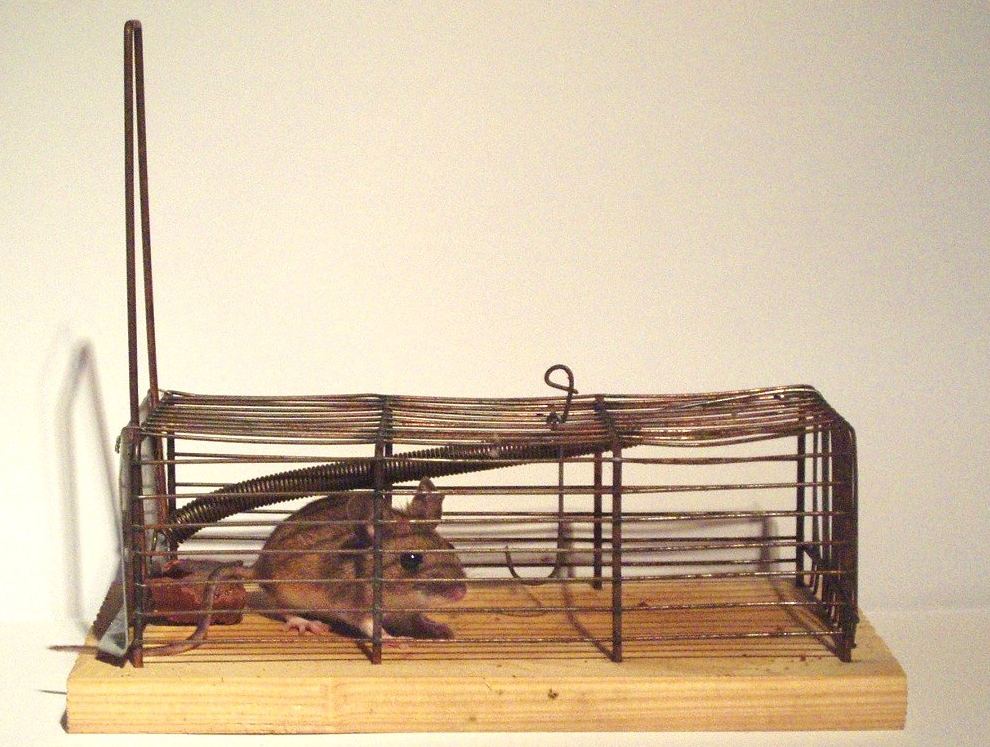
Mousetrap, mouse, bait (chocolate)

Wood mouse is captured with cage snap case.

An early patented mousetrap is a live capture device patented in 1870 by W K Bachman of South Carolina. These traps have the advantage of allowing the mouse to be released into the wild, or the disadvantage of having to personally kill the captured animal if release is not desired. To ensure a live capture, these traps need to be regularly checked as captured mice can die from stress or starvation. Captured mice need to be released some distance away, as mice have a strong homing instinct. House mice tend to not survive long away from human settlements due to higher levels of predation.

There are many methods to live trap mice. A simple approach claimed to work consists of a lightweight jar or drinking glass with sticky bait such as peanut butter stuck inside on the bottom, placed upside down with its rim elevated by a coin stood on edge. If a mouse enters and attempts to reach the bait, the coin is displaced and the glass traps the mouse. Another method of live trapping, the bucket trap, is to make a half-oval shaped tunnel with a toilet paper roll, put bait on one end of the roll, place the roll on a counter or table with the baited end sticking out over the edge, and put a deep bin under the edge. When the mouse enters the toilet paper roll to take the bait, the roll (and the mouse) will tip over the edge and fall into the bin below; the bin needs to be deep enough to ensure that the mouse cannot jump out.

A style of trap that has been used extensively by researchers in the biological sciences for capturing animals such as mice is the Sherman trap, which folds flat for storage, and captures the animal, without injury, for examination.

=== Glue mousetraps ===
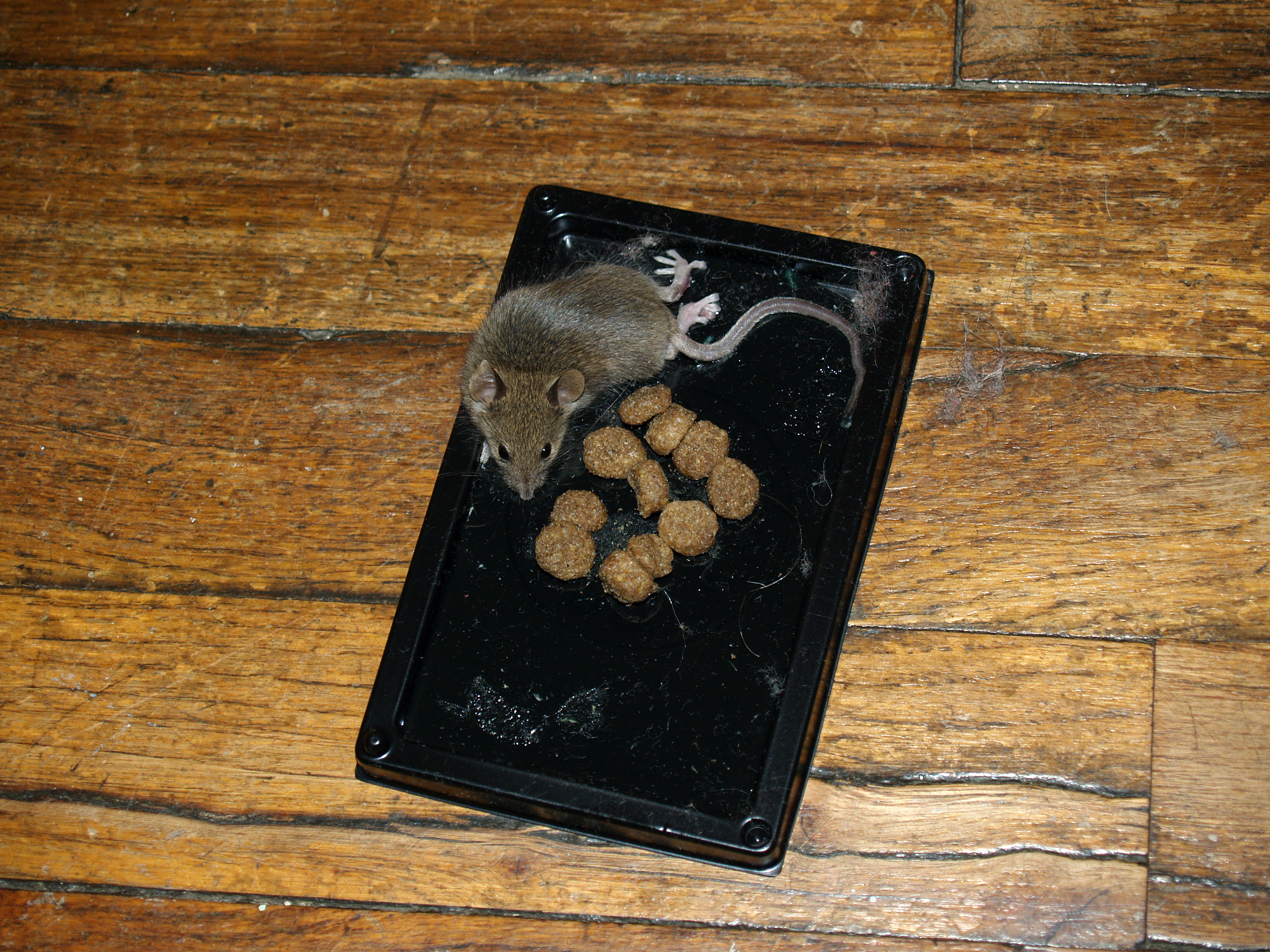
A mouse stuck in a glue trap

Glue traps are made using natural or synthetic adhesive applied to cardboard, plastic trays or similar material. Bait can be placed in the center or a scent may be added to the adhesive by the manufacturer; or the trap can be placed where the mice run. They are used indoors, as they do not withstand outdoor moisture and dust. Once stepped on, glue strips or trays immobilize the animal on an adhesive surface. Manufacturers generally advise disposing of the animal together with the trap.

Unlike traditional snap traps, glue traps do not kill; trapped animals may struggle for extended periods, eventually dying from dehydration, or starvation, exposure, or predation. The prolonged suffering involved has led to criticism from animal welfare organizations such as PETA and the RSPCA. As a result, glue traps are regulated or banned in several places, including New Zealand, Ireland, and parts of Australia. In some jurisdictions, their use is restricted to licensed pest control operators, with a requirement to kill the animals humanely.

Glue traps can harm non-target wildlife when used improperly or placed in accessible areas. Birds, reptiles, domestic pets and small mammals, some legally protected, and domestic pets may become stuck. Vegetable oil or mineral oil can be used to help releasing stuck animals.

=== Bucket mousetraps ===
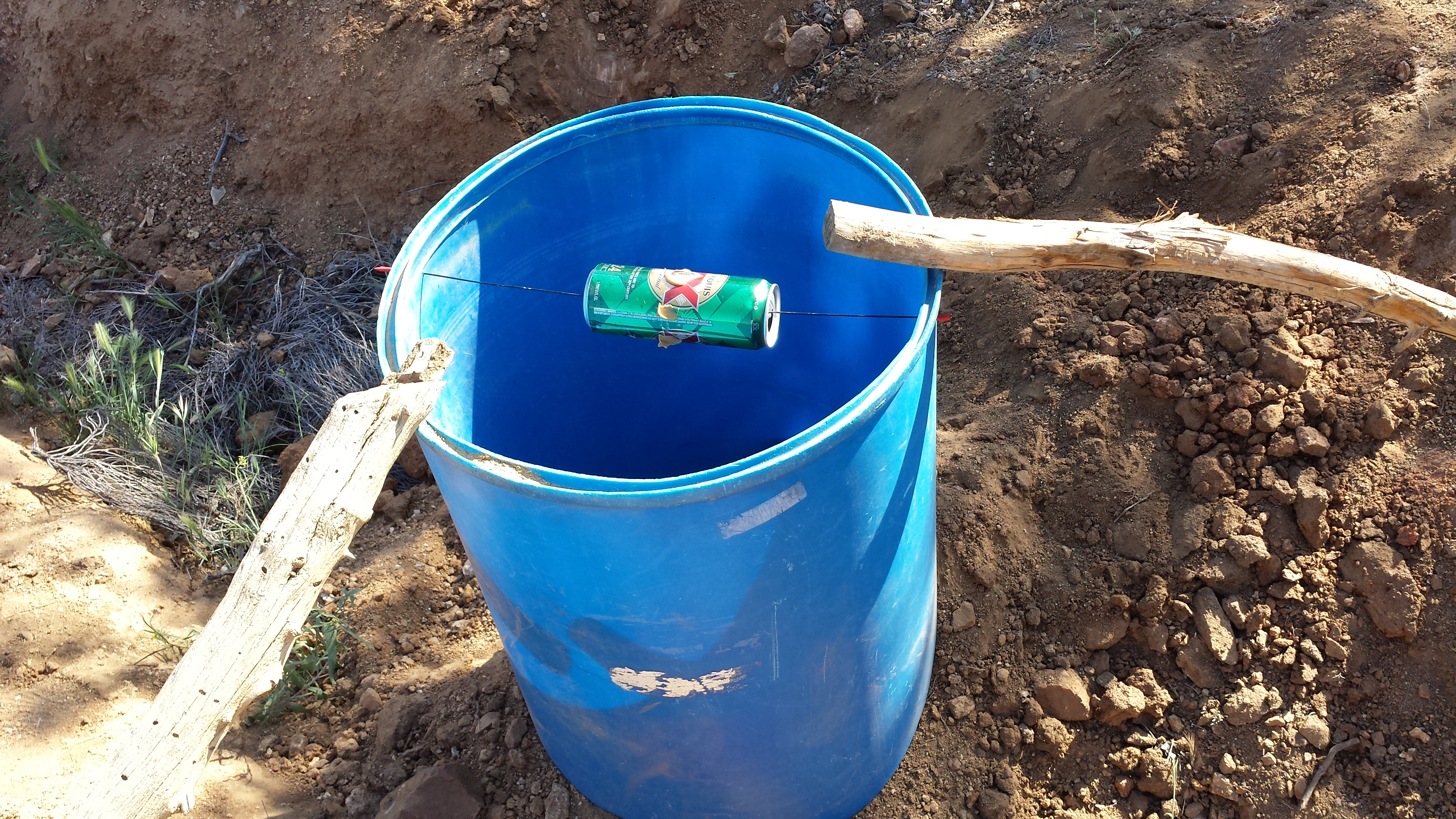
A bucket trap

Bucket traps may be lethal or non-lethal. Both types have a ramp which leads to the rim of a deep-walled container, such as a bucket. The variations are many with some being single-catch and some multi-catch.

Simple multi-catch bucket mousetraps can be made or purchased. Two effective types lure the mouse with bait, and use simple mechanisms to drop it into the bucket (empty, or containing water). A ramp leads up to the operational part, which may be a freely rotating cylinder such as a can, or a "walk the plank" setup with a small balanced board which tips with the weight of a mouse (or rat).

The bucket may contain a liquid to drown the trapped mouse. The mouse is baited to the top of the container where it falls into the bucket and drowns. Sometimes soap or caustic or poison chemicals are used in the bucket as killing agents.

In non-lethal versions, the bucket is usually empty, allowing the mouse to live but keeping it trapped until the owner of the trap can release them.

Another design uses a bowl (or similar container) containing a 1–2 centimetres (0.39–0.79 in) deep layer of vegetable oil, with a ramp leading up to the edge of the bowl. Mice, attracted by the oil's scent, climb in and become covered in the slippery oil, making it impossible for them to crawl or jump out.

In both cases, the unharmed mouse can be released outdoors. However, if several mice are caught simultaneously, and especially if the trap is subsequently left unchecked for several days before release, the mice may kill and eat each other to avoid starvation unless the trap is checked and emptied regularly.

=== Disposable mousetraps ===
There are several types of one-time use, disposable mousetraps, generally made of inexpensive materials which are designed to be disposed of after catching a mouse. These mousetraps have similar trapping mechanisms as other traps, however, they generally conceal the dead mouse so it can be disposed of without being sighted. Glue traps are usually considered disposable – the trap is discarded with the mouse adhered to the trap.

=== Continuous traps ===
Traps using motion and heat sensors are used in places like sewers. Sensors detect the prey and trigger a chisel-like spear-mechanism that kills the target. Sewage flow removes target from the trap which is ready to kill again.

== Ethical and environmental concerns of different trap types ==
Strong concerns have been raised about the environmental harm and the level of suffering caused by some types of traps.

Glue traps pose a significant risk to wildlife and pets, with many such animals becoming stuck and dying. Concerns have also been raised about the hygiene and health risks associated with glue traps, including the potential transmission of diseases to household members and to the person removing the trap.

A 2003 study ranked different rodent control methods according to their level of humaneness. The researchers noted that preventive steps, such as sealing entry points, are effective but underused.

Electrocution traps and well-designed snap traps were identified as relatively humane because they kill instantly and minimize suffering; glue traps raise serious humaneness concerns as they kill slowly with intense anxiety, pain, torn fur, ripped skin, and sometimes fractured limbs unless checked frequently. In comparing poisons, the researchers argued that fast-acting, high-impact toxins such as alpha-chloralose and cyanide were more humane because they minimize suffering, whereas anticoagulant poisons act over several days and cause prolonged distress, disability, and pain.

There is considerable variation in the killing effectiveness of snap traps. Trap effectiveness matters both for efficient pest control and for reducing rodent suffering by killing instantly; traps may injure but not immediately kill a mouse. Two 2012 studies found large differences in the mechanical performance of commercial snap traps, including some models delivering striking forces 6–8 times greater than others.

Trap effectiveness can be measured by mortality rates and time to death or loss of consciousness, metrics included in international animal welfare standards. The range is wide, spanning 74% to 99% across trap types and bait used. In one tested brand, the mouse mortality rate was 98% with peanut butter, but 70% with chocolate.

== Similar devices ==
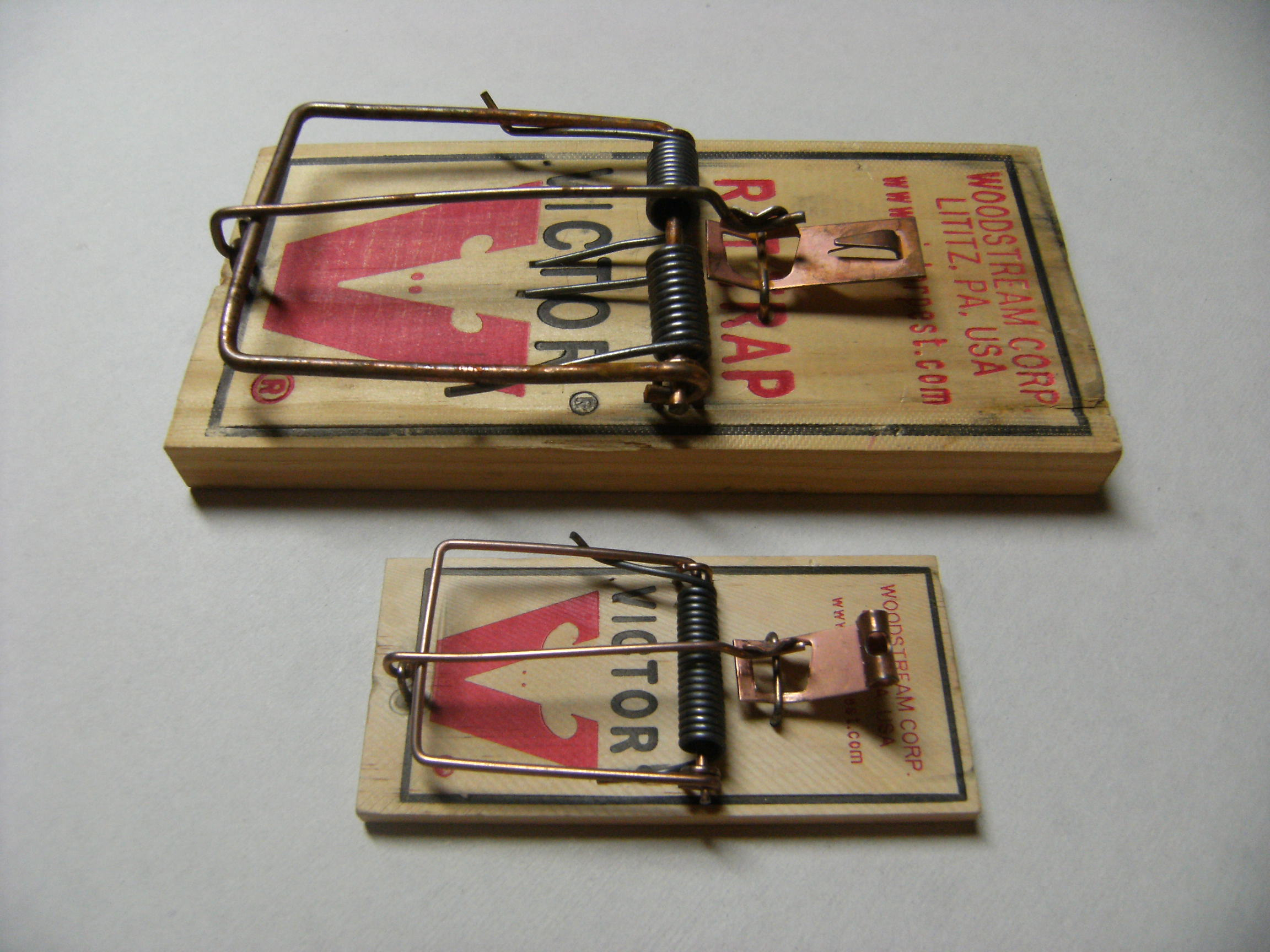
Size comparison between a rat trap (above) and a mousetrap (below)

Similar ranges of traps are sized to trap other animal species; for example, rat traps are larger than mousetraps, and squirrel traps are larger still. A squirrel trap is a metal box-shaped device that is designed to catch squirrels and other similarly sized animals. The device works by drawing the animals in with bait that is placed inside. Upon touch, it forces both sides closed, thereby trapping, but not killing, the animal, which can then be released or killed at the trapper's discretion.

== History ==
A historical reference is found in Alciatis Emblemata from 1534. Several trap designs were described by Leonard Mascall in 1590. The conventional mousetrap with a spring-loaded snap mechanism resting on a block of wood first appeared in 1884, and to this day is still considered to be one of the most inexpensive and effective mousetraps.

== In general culture ==
An early reference to mousetraps is found in the Ancient Greek parody The Battle of Frogs and Mice: "... by unheard-of arts they had contrived a wooden snare, a destroyer of Mice, which they call a trap.". In English, reference to a mousetrap is made in the late 1300s in the prelude section to Chaucer's The Canterbury Tales. While introducing the Nun, Chaucer writes in lines 144-145, "She wolde wepe, if that she saugh a mous/Kaught in a trappe, if it were deed or bledde." Mousetraps are also referenced in Shakespeare's Hamlet (Act III, scene 2), where 'The Mousetrap' is the name given to the 'play-within-a-play' by Hamlet himself: "'tis a knavish piece of work", he calls it. There is a reference in the 1844 novel The Three Musketeers by Alexandre Dumas, père. Chapter ten is titled "A Mousetrap of the Seventeenth Century". In this case, rather than referring to a literal mouse trap, the author describes a police or guard tactic that involves lying in wait in the residence of someone whom they have arrested without public knowledge and then grabbing, interviewing, and probably arresting anyone who comes to the residence. In the voice of a narrator, the author confesses to having no idea how the term became attached to this tactic. A mousetrap (Spanish: ratonera) figures prominently in the second chapter of the 1554 Spanish novel Lazarillo de Tormes, in which the hero Lazarillo steals cheese from a mousetrap to alleviate his hunger.

Ralph Waldo Emerson is credited (apparently incorrectly) with the oft-quoted phrase advocating innovation: "Build a better mousetrap, and the world will beat a path to your door."

The Mousetrap is a popular play by Agatha Christie.

Mousetraps are a staple of slapstick comedy and animated cartoons. Episodes of the cartoon Tom and Jerry usually have plots based on Tom attempting to trap Jerry with different (and sometimes ridiculous) methods of trapping the mouse with a device realized as a Rube Goldberg machine, often being outsmarted by the latter and injuring himself in the process with the traps.

Mouse Trap (originally titled Mouse Trap Game) is a board game first published by Ideal in 1963 for two to four players. The game was one of the first mass-produced, three-dimensional board games. Over the course of the game, players at first cooperate to build a working Rube Goldberg-like mouse trap. Once the mouse trap has been built, players turn against each other, attempting to trap opponents' mouse-shaped game pieces.

Mousetraps loaded with table tennis balls or corks have been used to demonstrate the principle of a chain reaction.

Mousetraps had become a subject of "challenges" on YouTube where people attempted to trigger them quickly with their hands, fingers or even tongue without getting trapped, as well as setting up multiple mousetraps as a prank. YouTubers Gavin Free and Daniel Gruchy created an experiment using a trampoline lined up with hundreds of mousetraps, triggered all at once by jumping into the trampoline, and recorded it in slow-motion.

== See also ==
- Animal trapping
- Gun powered mousetrap
- Mousetrap car
- Pest control
- Rodenticide
- Torsion spring
