= James Henry Atkinson =

British ironmonger

James Henry Atkinson (c. 1849–1942) was an English ironmonger from Leeds, Yorkshire who is best known for his 1899 patent of the Little Nipper mousetrap. He is cited by some as the inventor of the classic spring-loaded mousetrap, but this basic style of mousetrap was patented a few years earlier in the United States by William Chauncey Hooker in 1894.

== Little Nipper ==
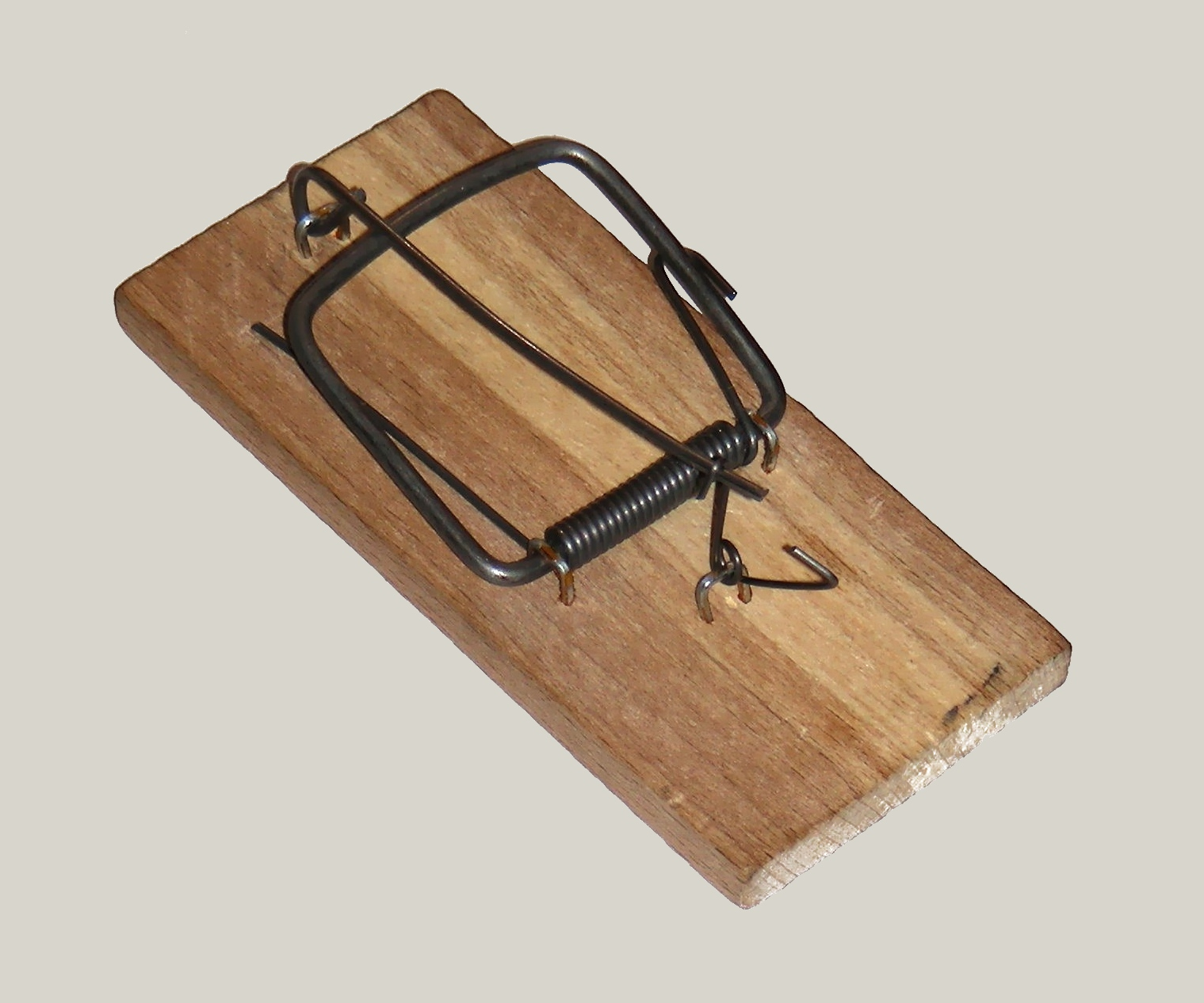
A mousetrap very similar to Atkinson's Little Nipper design

Atkinson patented various inventions including a number of mousetrap mechanisms (GB189827488, GB189913277, GB190002503, GB190008317, GB190820769, GB191022542). The mousetrap patents included a number of variations of the now classic snapping mousetrap consisting of a spring-loaded hinged metal bar mounted on a small flat wooden base. It slams shut in 38/1000 of a second, killing the mouse by breaking its spine and causing shock and internal bleeding. Although some of his designs were more sophisticated (for example treadle activated triggers) it is the simple ‘Little Nipper´ that was the most successful. The spring-on-board mousetrap design has captured a sixty-percent share of the British mousetrap market alone, and an estimated equal share of the international market.

In 1913, James Atkinson sold his mousetrap patent for 1,000 pounds to Procter, the company that has been producing the "Little Nipper" ever since. Additionally, Procter has established a mousetrap museum with 150 exhibits at its factory headquarters.
