= Physics education in the United Kingdom =

Physics education in the United Kingdom is mostly carried out from the ages of 16 to 18 at secondary schools, or sixth forms, and to a higher level across the Physics departments at British universities.

== History ==
=== Course content ===
Previous to the 1960s, the curriculum was neatly divided into heat, light, magnetism, electricity, mechanics and sound. Around the late 1950s, the Science Masters Association developed the syllabus called 'Physics for Grammar Schools'.

In 1956 the US set up their Physical Science Study Committee (PSSC), which would directly influence physics teaching in the UK. In the PSSC plan, teaching was less rigidly, and monotonously, compartmentalised, and could demonstrate how some topics were possibly interwoven, in a fabric of knowledge, combined with more experimental apparatus.

A National Committee on Physics Education set by the Royal Society and the Institute of Physics, with Sir Nevill Francis Mott as chairman; Mott jointly won the 1977 Nobel Prize in Physics. It worked with the Nuffield Foundation, to found the Nuffield Physics Project in April 1962, with Sir Nevil Mott as chairman, with the 11-16 Project led by Donald MacGill and Eric M. Rogers, followed by the Advanced Level Project, led by Paul Black, of the University of Birmingham, and Jon Ogborn, of Worcester College of Higher Education. Norman Clarke also worked with the Institute on Physics education, in the 1960s.

In 1987 the Institute of Physics set up annual three-day Physics Update Courses at Malvern College, for secondary school teachers, financially supported by the Worshipful Company of Armourers and Brasiers.

=== Participation ===
7.6% of all A-levels in 1982 were Physics, by 1990 it was 6%, and by 2004 it was 3.8%.

In 2022 Physics was the second-most popular A-level choice for males, being the 16th most-popular for females. 4.7% of all A-level entrants took Physics. Many females take Psychology A-level, being the most popular A-level for females, followed by Biology, then English. Around three times as many females take Art and design, English, and Psychology, as males take. Psychology was the second-most popular A-level in 2023, with 78,000, followed by Biology with 68,000. The most popular A-levels for males are Maths, then Physics, then Chemistry and then Biology.

=== Reports ===
The Targeted Initiative on Science and Mathematics Education (TISME), funded by the ESRC, looked at who took up science, in collaboration with Institute of Physics, with Louise Archer (academic), and Sir John Holman.

One part of the project was UPMAP - Understanding Participation rates in post-16 Mathematics and Physics, a three-year longitudinal study of around 700 children in years 8, 10, 12, with interviews of ages 16–18, and first year undergraduates.

== Secondary schools ==
=== England, Wales and Northern Ireland ===
At GCSE level, students can choose to study physics either as a whole subject separate from biology and chemistry (referred to as "triple science") or as part of a so-called "combined science" course, in which all three sciences are sandwiched into a single qualification worth two GCSEs. At GCSE, students are taught the basics of a broad range of physical concepts including energy, waves, Newtonian mechanics, electricity, thermal physics and nuclear physics among others. There is also a practical element (known as "required practicals"), which is conducted in the classroom and then assessed via questions in the final exam papers. Because of this, it is theoretically possible for students to pass the GCSE required practical element without doing a single experiment.

Students wishing to continue to study physics after their GCSEs may then choose to study the subject as an A-level qualification (lasting two years) or an AS-level (lasting one year). A-level physics also includes required practicals, but unlike at GCSE, these are assessed in-class by teachers. Students who pass are given "practical accreditation", which some universities require before allowing a student onto certain science courses. There are still questions in the final exams regarding practical technique, but answering these questions correctly does not contribute to practical accreditation. Much of the content of A-level physics is elaborating (albeit quite extensively) on topics covered at GCSE, with the addition of units not present in the GCSE course, such as particle physics. Despite containing significantly less mathematical rigour nowadays than in the past, physics is still widely regarded as the most demanding A-level course available, and is one of the least popular subjects in proportion to its availability. There is some concern that not enough 17- to 18-year-olds are leaving school with A-level physics to meet the demands of the modern job market.

In England, physics is an 'enabling subject'. The IOP Future Physics Leaders scheme is funded by the DfE for schools in low participation areas. (See also: science education in England.)

=== Scotland ===
In Scotland, Highers and Advanced Highers replace GCSEs and A-levels respectively. The content of the qualifications is fairly similar. Since Scottish post-16 school students finish school a year earlier than their counterparts in the rest of the UK, the content of the first year of the physics degrees offered at most Scottish universities is similar to the second year of A-level physics.

=== Female participation ===
At 16, Physics is the second most popular subject for boys, but the 18th most popular for girls. 2% of females, and 6.5% of males choose Physics at A-level.

== University ==
Most university physics courses in the UK have their content moderated by the Institute of Physics (IOP) and are referred to as being "IOP-accredited". The aim of this is to ensure that all physics students graduate with the knowledge and skills required to work as a professional physicist. Physics can be studied as a 3-year Bachelor of Science degree (4 years in Scotland) or as an integrated Master's degree, in which students who pass the first 3 or 4 years then take a final "master's year" without having to apply again for any Master's courses. Alternatively, students who initially apply to study BSc Physics can apply to study for a master's degree when they graduate.

47 universities offer Physics courses accredited by the IoP. Scottish universities have four-year BSc undergraduate courses or five-year MPhys/MSci undergraduate courses with integrated masters.

Of those with Physics A-level, around 3,000 take Physics on an undergraduate course, followed by Mechanical Engineering and Mathematics, both just under 3,000; next is Civil Engineering, just over 1500.

There were around 710 PhD Physics research degrees a year in 2009-10, with the researchers being 435 from the UK, 110 from the EU, and 135 from overseas; 165 were female (around 20%).

After university, around 55% do a further degree, and 1.7% start a PGCE; 25% go into the private sector.

=== Participation of women ===
The UK produces fewer women engineers, per capita, than any European country. For science disciplines, only in medicine and biology do women undergraduates outnumber men in the UK.

== Broadcasting ==
=== Television ===
- 20 September 1965 BBC1 Middle School Physics, on Mondays at 10.30am, repeated on Tuesdays at 4pm, and Wednesdays at 10am; presented by David Chaundy (taught at Christ's Hospital in Sussex, and Malvern College), Jim Jardine, Bill Ritchie, and Bill Trotter (taught at Elliott School, Putney, and was part of the Nuffield Physics Project), produced by John Cain and John Field; repeated in September 1966, September 1967, and September 1968
- 25 September 1968 BBC1 Science Extra: Physics, fortnightly on Wednesdays at 11.30am, repeated on Mondays at 9.30am and Thursdays at 10.30am, for 14-15 year olds, with Jim Jardine (1923-2023, who taught Physics at Moray House School of Education and Sport), Bill Ritchie, John Osborne, Austin Tatchell, actor Tenniel Evans and Bryan Chapman (1932-2018, former head boy of Lowestoft County Grammar School). Produced by David Roseveare, Robin Gwyn; repeated in September 1969, September 1970, September 1971 and September 1972
- 25 September 1975 BBC1 Physical Science on Thursdays at 11.30am, mostly chemistry, but covered topics such as energy and radioactivity, but only at a broad level, but was apparently for ages 14–16, possibly CSE level. Presented by Ivan Howlett, produced by Peter Baker. Repeated September 1976, September 1977, September 1978, September 1979, January 1981, September 1981, and September 1982

== Results by LEA in England ==
=== Highest number of entries for Physics A-level ===
- Hampshire 840
- Kent 760
- Hertfordshire 748
- Surrey 626
- Essex 506
- Birmingham 505
- Lancashire 488
- Buckinghamshire 479

=== Lowest number of entries for Physics A-level ===
- Knowsley 4 (Knowsley only entered 61 A-levels in 2016)
- Portsmouth 9
- Halton 22
- Barnsley 30
- Blackpool 34
- Middlesbrough 35
- Blackburn 36
- Bracknell Forest 36
- South Tyneside 36
- Hartlepool 37

== See also ==
- European Physical Society (based in France), which offers physics outreach, and works heavily with the International Association of Physics Students, producing the European Journal of Physics on Physics teaching (published by IOP Publishing)
- List of physics concepts in primary and secondary education curricula
- The Physics Teacher, an American publication
- Physics Education, a publication by the IOP
