= Teaching quantum mechanics =

Approaches to teaching quantum mechanics

Quantum mechanics is a difficult subject to teach due to its counterintuitive nature. As the subject is now offered by advanced secondary schools, educators have applied scientific methodology to the process of teaching quantum mechanics, in order to identify common misconceptions and ways of improving students' understanding.

== Common learning difficulties ==
Students' misconceptions range from fully classical physics thinking, mixed models, to quasi-quantum ideas. For example, if the concept that quantum mechanics does not describe a path for electrons or photons is misunderstood, students may believe that they follow specific trajectories (classical), or sinusoidal paths (mixes), or are simultaneously wave and particles (quasi-quantum: "in which students understand that quantum objects can behave as both particles and waves, but still have difficulty describing events in a nondeterministic way"). Among the concepts most often misunderstood are:

- the postulates of quantum mechanics provide no description for the trajectories for electrons or photons,
- amplitude of a wave is not a measure of energy,
- most bound states have no corresponding classical orbits,
- in practice, quantum mechanics gives probabilisitic rather than deterministic results, (Note: Whether the apparent nondeterminism of quantum mechanics is truly fundamental depends on the interpretation.)
- intrinsic uncertainty rather than measurement error.

Issues also arise from misunderstanding classical concepts related to quantum concepts, such as the difference between light energy and light intensity.

== Teaching strategies ==
=== Mathematics ===
Quantum mechanics can be taught with a focus on different interpretations, different models, or via mathematical techniques. Studies have shown that focus on non-mathematical concepts can lead to adequate understanding.

=== Digital and multi-media ===
Despite the fundamental impossibility of directly viewing quantum states, multimedia visualizations are an important tool in education. Interactive media provides an alternative experience beyond everyday personal experience as a tool for understanding quantum mechanics. Among the multimedia sites that have been studied with positive results are QuVis and Phet.

=== History and philosophy of science as educational guides ===
In introducing history as part of the process of teaching quantum mechanics sets up a potential conflict of goals: accurate history or pedagogical clarity. Studies have shown that teaching through history helps students recognize that the counterintuitive issues are fundamental rather than simply something they don't understand. Specifically discussing the historical debates on quantum concepts drives home the idea the quantum differs from classical. Discussing the philosophy of science introduces the idea that language derived from everyday experience limits our ability to describe quantum phenomena.

=== Directly discussing the meanings of words ===
Mohan analyzes two widely used representative quantum mechanics textbooks against the learning challenges reported by Krijtenburg-Lewerissa and others. Both texts adopt language ('waves' and 'particles') familiar to students in other contexts without directly exploring the significant shifts in meaning required by quantum mechanics. Mohan attributes some of the learning challenges to this unexplored application of inappropriate language.

== Teaching for quantum computing ==
N. David Mermin reports that an unconventional strategy based on abstract but simple math concepts is sufficient to teach quantum mechanics to students interested in quantum computing application rather than physics. Many of the issues that confound students of physics to not apply to this case and the mathematical background of quantum computing resembles the background already taught in computer science. Mermin develops notation and operations with classical bits then introduces quantum bits as superpositions of two classical states. He never needs to discuss even the Planck constant, which he suggests is important for quantum computer hardware but not software.

== Teaching based on quantum optics ==
Philipp Blitzenbauer engages students through simple but intrinsically quantum single-photon experiments. The approach avoids the ambiguous classical vs quantum character of photons in optical interference experiments like the double slit. Students exposed to quantum mechanics in this way avoid developing misconceptions apparent among students in the control group.

== See also ==
- Introduction to quantum mechanics
- List of textbooks about quantum mechanics
- Mermin's device
- Physics education
- Physics education research
