= John Dirk Walecka =

American theoretical physicist

- Born: March 11, 1932 (age 94); Milwaukee, Wisconsin
- Education: Harvard University (BA); Massachusetts Institute of Technology (PhD)
- Awards: Fellow of the National Science Foundation (1958-1960); Fellow of the American Physical Society (1971-present); Tom W. Bonner Prize in Nuclear Physics (1991); Eugene Feenberg Memorial Medal (2009)
- Scientific career
- Fields: Physics
- Workplaces: CERN; Stanford University; Continuous Electron Beam Accelerator Facility; College of William and Mary
- Doctoral advisor: Victor Weisskopf
- Doctoral students: Ernest Moniz; Steven Pollock

John Dirk Walecka, often quoted as J. Dirk Walecka (born March 11, 1932) is an American theoretical nuclear and particle physicist. He is a fellow of the American Physical Society and the author of numerous textbooks in physics. Walecka is currently the Governor's Distinguished CEBAF Professor of Physics, emeritus at the College of William and Mary.

== Life ==
Walecka studied at Harvard University as an undergraduate, reviving a Bachelor of Arts in 1954, and received his doctorate in 1958 under Victor Weisskopf at the Massachusetts Institute of Technology. Walecka moved to Stanford University in 1959, where he was made assistant professor in 1960, upon completing his NSF fellowship, and Professor in 1966. From 1977 to 1982 he was head of the physics faculty and from 1987 he holds the title of emeritus Professor of Physics. From 1986 to 1992 he was the scientific director of the Continuous Electron Beam Accelerator Facility (CEBAF) in Newport News, Virginia. From 1992 he was the Distinguished CEBAF Professor of Physics at the College of William and Mary, where he headed the Nuclear Physics Institute and the Physics Faculty. In 1991 he served as the Distinguished Ship Lecturer at Stanford. Also from 1992 he worked at the Thomas Jefferson National Accelerator Facility.

Walecka is the author of a standard work on quantum mechanical many-body theory with Alexander Fetter and a book on many-body methods in theoretical nuclear physics. He was particularly concerned with electron scattering on nuclei. In 2000 he edited Felix Bloch's lectures on statistical mechanics (World Scientific).

== Awards ==
Walecka has been a fellow of the American Physical Society since 1971. and was a fellow of the National Science Foundation from 1958 through 1960, while at CERN and then Stanford.

In 1996 Walecka received the Tom W. Bonner Prize in Nuclear Physics. for "his preeminent theoretical guidance and inspirational leadership in exploiting electromagnetic and weak probes of the nucleus and for his fundamental contributions to the understanding of the nucleus as a relativistic quantum many-body system."

In 2009 he received the Eugene Feenberg Memorial Medal "for theoretical contributions in electroweak interactions with nuclei, the development of relativistic field theories of the nuclear many-body problem and unparalleled achievements in the education of a generation of young nuclear many-body physicists".

== Publications ==
- Theoretical nuclear and subnuclear physics, Oxford University Press 1996
- with Alexander L. Fetter: Quantum theory of many particle systems, McGraw Hill 1971, Dover 2006
- with Fetter: Theoretical mechanics of particles and continua, McGraw Hill 1980, Dover 2003
- with Fetter: Nonlinear Mechanics, Dover 2006
- Introduction to General Relativity, World Scientific 2007
- Introduction to Modern Physics - Theoretical Foundations, World Scientific 2008
- Electron Scattering for Nuclear and Nucleon Structure, Cambridge University Press 2001
- Donnelly, T. W.; Walecka, J. D. (1975). "Electron Scattering and Nuclear Structure". Annual Review of Nuclear Science. 25: 329–405. Bibcode:1975ARNPS..25..329D. doi:10.1146/annurev.ns.25.120175.001553.
- Advanced Modern Physics, World Scientific Publishing, 2010
- Topics in Modern Physics: Theoretical Foundations, World Scientific Publishing, 2013
- Introduction to Electricity and Magnetism, World Scientific Publishing, 2018
- Introduction to Classical Mechanics, World Scientific Publishing, 2020
- Introduction to Quantum Mechanics, World Scientific Publishing, 2021
