= Mousetrap car =

Small vehicle powered by a mousetrap

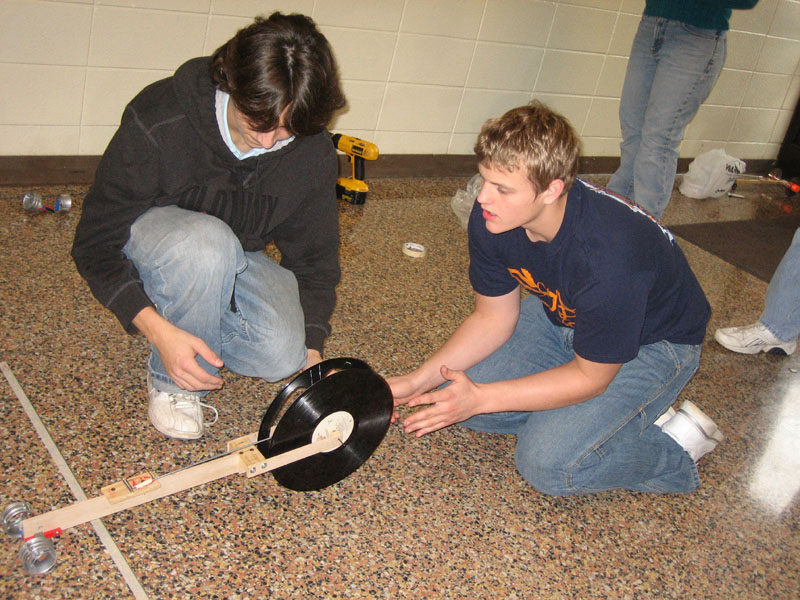
A mousetrap car designed for a distance competition

Illustration of Mousetrap car motion

A mousetrap car is a small vehicle whose only source of motive power is a mousetrap. Variations include the use of multiple traps, or very large rat traps, for greater power.

Mousetrap cars are often used in physics or other physical science classes such as technology education to help students build problem-solving skills, develop spatial awareness, learn to budget time, and practice cooperative behavior.

== Design ==
The general style for a mousetrap car varies. A number of commercial vendors offer plans, kits and complete cars for sale. In addition to mousetrap cars, contests have been created for mousetrap boats. and mousetrap airplanes.

=== Spring power ===
A mousetrap is powered by a helical torsion spring. Torsion springs obey an angular form of Hooke's law:

$$\tau = -\kappa\theta\,$$

where $\tau\,$ is the torque exerted by the spring in newton-meters, and $\theta\,$ is the angle of twist from its equilibrium position in radians. $\kappa\,$ is a constant with units of newton-meters / radian, variously called the spring's torsion coefficient, torsion elastic modulus, or just spring constant, equal to the torque required to twist the spring through an angle of 1 radian. It is analogous to the spring constant of a linear spring.

The energy of U, in joules, stored in a torsion spring is:

$$U = \frac{1}{2}\kappa\theta^2$$

When a mousetrap is assembled, the spring is initially twisted beyond its equilibrium position so that it applies significant torque to the bar when the trap is closed.

=== Power transmission to axle ===
This motion must be used to turn the car's axle or wheels. The most common solution is to attach a string to the mouse trap's arm and then wrap it around an axle. As the bar is released, it pulls on the string, causing the axle (and wheels) to turn.

Tying the string directly to the mousetrap's bar, however, will not make good use of the energy stored in the spring. The distance between the opened and closed positions of the bar of a mousetrap is typically 10 cm, so this is how much string would be pulled. Wrapped around even a small diameter axle, this amount of string will not create enough revolutions to move the car as far as it might go.

To get around this problem, most mousetrap cars add a lever to the bar so that the lever will pull a much greater length of string and cause the axle to turn many more revolutions.

=== Friction of wheels ===
Another reason to add a lever to the mousetrap bar is to reduce the amount of torque applied to the wheels. If too much torque is applied to the wheels, the force between the wheels and the ground will exceed the maximum frictional force due to the coefficient of friction between the wheel and ground surfaces. When this happens, the wheels slip and energy stored in the spring is wasted. Using a long lever on the mousetrap bar reduces the tension in the string due to the spring's torque, and thus reduces the torque applied to the car's wheels.

In addition to reducing the torque applied to the wheels, the coefficient of friction may be improved by using higher friction materials.

=== Distance car ===
Making this type of car revolves around having the most force from the spring transferred to the lever arm and making the drive axle rotate. In order to get the most distance out of the car, the lever arm must be long. This allows the car to get more rotation out of the wheels because of the longer string that will come along with a longer lever arm. Then, make the drive wheels larger because the higher the diameter of the wheel, the more ground it covers. Along with this, make sure to have the axles smaller than the wheel so there can be more pulling distance. Reducing the most friction possible is important because the more friction there is, the more energy is lost in propelling the car. Mass should also be taken into account; the more the car weighs, the more energy from the mousetrap spring will be used. It is optimal to make the car lightweight.

=== Speed car ===
Making a speed mouse trap car involves extracting the most energy you can from the mousetrap spring in a short distance. The lever arm needs to be shorter than the distance car's because the shorter the arm is, the faster the spring will snap, and thus more torque gets extracted from the spring. Most of the car's weight is distributed to the back, where the drive axle is located. Built this way, the car will not have much drag in the front, slowing it down. The wheels don't need to be too large but the axle should be larger in relation to the wheel. The wheels need good traction because without the right amount of friction the wheels attached to the drive axle will slip and not push the car forwards because of all the added torque.
