= List of physics concepts in primary and secondary education curricula =

This is a list of topics that are included in high school physics curricula or textbooks.

== Mathematical Background ==
- SI Units
- Scalar (physics)
- Euclidean vector
- Motion graphs and derivatives
- Pythagorean theorem
- Trigonometry

== Motion and forces ==
- Motion
- Force

=== Linear motion ===
- Linear motion
- Displacement
- Speed
- Velocity
- Acceleration
- Center of mass
- Mass
- Momentum
- Newton's laws of motion
- Work (physics)
- Free body diagram

=== Rotational motion ===
- Angular momentum (Introduction)
- Angular velocity
- Centrifugal force
- Centripetal force
- Circular motion
- Tangential velocity
- Torque

== Conservation of energy and momentum ==
- Energy
- Conservation of energy
- Elastic collision
- Inelastic collision
- Inertia
- Moment of inertia
- Momentum
- Kinetic energy
- Potential energy
- Rotational energy

== Electricity and magnetism ==
- Ampère's circuital law
- Capacitor
- Coulomb's law
- Diode
- Direct current
- Electric charge
- Electric current
- Alternating current
- Electric field
- Electric potential energy
- Electron
- Faraday's law of induction
- Ion
- Inductor
- Joule heating
- Lenz's law
- Magnetic field
- Ohm's law
- Resistor
- Transistor
- Transformer
- Voltage

== Heat ==
- Entropy
- First law of thermodynamics
- Heat
- Heat transfer
- Second law of thermodynamics
- Temperature
- Thermal energy
- Thermodynamic cycle
- Volume (thermodynamics)
- Work (thermodynamics)

== Waves ==
- Wave
- Longitudinal wave
- Transverse waves
- Transverse wave
- Standing Waves
- Wavelength
- Frequency
- Light
- Light ray
- Speed of light
- Sound
- Speed of sound
- Radio waves
- Harmonic oscillator
- Hooke's law
- Reflection
- Refraction
- Snell's law
- Refractive index
- Total internal reflection
- Diffraction
- Interference (wave propagation)
- Polarization (waves)
- Vibrating string
- Doppler effect

== Gravity ==
- Gravitational potential
- Newton's law of universal gravitation
- Newtonian constant of gravitation

== See also ==
- Outline of physics
- Physics education
