= Learning Assistant Model =

The Learning Assistant Model supports curriculum and course transformation, discipline-based education research, institutional transformation, and teacher recruitment. The LA Model supports transforming courses to align with research-based instructional strategies through hiring Learning Assistants to facilitate evidence-based, small group learning activities. Learning Assistants are undergraduate students who, through the guidance of weekly preparation sessions and a pedagogy course, facilitate discussions among groups of students in a variety of classroom settings that encourage active engagement. The LA Model is adopted by and implemented at local institutions who create their own LA Program.

Laurie S. Langdon, Valerie Otero, Steven Pollock, Steven Iona, and Richard McCray received the American Physical Society 2019 Excellence in Physics Education Award "For the development of the Learning Assistant (LA) model and the associated LA Alliance, which has enhanced physics teacher education and recruitment, supported undergraduate course transformation, and physics instructor professional development."

== Program Goals ==
Every LA Program incorporates four major goals of varying emphasis: curriculum & course transformation, college/university recruitment and preparation, institutional change, and discipline-based education research.

=== Curriculum & course transformation ===
The LA Model supports course transformation into active student learning.

=== Discipline-based education research ===
The LA Model introduces and supports conversations between math and science research faculty about education research and its role in creating effective learning spaces.

=== Institutional change ===
The LA model acts as a change agent in faculty, departments, and institutional practices by providing infrastructure to support and reward instructional innovation.

=== Teacher recruitment & preparation ===
The LA model is an effective method of recruitment and preparation for collegiate academia. It can both provide exposure and generate interest to undergraduates who had never thought of teaching as a career before and help those who are on the fence decide if teaching is right for them. Meanwhile, the LA program emphasizes “best practices” and provides diverse student support which are helpful for students at any level.

== Resources ==
=== Website ===
The Learning Assistant Alliance website serves as a hub for information and resources related to the LA Model and starting and running an LA Program. The site is hosted by the University of Colorado Boulder. General information and resources are openly available to all who visit the site. Site registration is required to gain access to more in-depth resources on the pedagogy course, research, and program materials.

=== LA Campus ===
The LA Campus platform is a suite of tools for managing an LA Program. LA Campus in a system in which faculty apply for having LAs in their course, students apply to be LAs, programs hire LAs and assign them to courses, etc.

=== LASSO ===
Learning About STEM Student Outcomes (LASSO) is an online platform to support instructors assessing their courses. The platform administers assessments online to students, freeing up class time, and automatically analyzes the data. LASSO is hosted on the LearningAssistantAlliance.org website. The LAA developed the LASSO online assessment platform to increase instructor use of research-based assessments (RBAs). LASSO does this by making it easy to collect and analyze high-quality evidence about student learning in their courses. Specifically, LASSO simplifies the process of administering, scoring, and analyzing RBAs and saves class time by automating the process online. Course results are anonymized and aggregated in the LASSO database to provide instructors normative feedback about their student outcomes.

=== Conferences and Regional Workshops ===
The Learning Assistant Alliance and the University of Colorado Boulder LA Program host an annual conference in Boulder, Colorado, in late October or early November. The conference brings together new and mature programs to share ideas and experiences.

Regional workshops are typically offered in the spring and summer, at universities throughout the United States. Topics covered are similar to those at the International Conference, but local specializations are highlighted.
