= Physics Bowl =

National physics competition

PhysicsBowl is a national physics competition coordinated by the American Association of Physics Teachers (AAPT). The test is taken during the first half of April each year by approximately 10,000 physics students. Competitors must attempt 40 physics-related multiple choice questions in a 45 minute long time period. First-year physics students take the Division I test, while second-year physics students take the Division II test. The test can be administered physically on paper, but it is now also offered digitally by the online instructional application WebAssign.

== History ==
Originally based on the American Chemical Society's general chemistry test, PhysicsBowl was used as an external benchmark for physics teachers to assess student performance starting in 1983. The contest was first administered nationally in 1985 as the "Metrologic Exam," named after its original sponsor, and was renamed to "Physics Bowl" in 1990. In 2002, the test expanded to include a second division. Division I students complete questions 1 through 40, while Division II students complete questions 11–50. The Division 2 contest contains more difficult questions and is made for students with advanced conceptual understanding of physics. Students participating in the Division 2 contest usually take more than a year of physics while students who participate in the Division 1 contest usually take a year or less of physics. Thus the whole test is 50 questions long, but each student must only complete 40, and the middle 30 questions overlap between divisions.

== 2017 Physics Bowl Winners: Division 1 ==
Rank	Score	Student	School	State
1	38	LIU, PATRICK Y	SpringLight Education Institute	CA
2	36	WANG, LU	Beijing New Oriental Foreign Language School at Yangzhou	Jiangsu
3	36	LIU, JASON	Stamford Polytechnic at Beacon	CT
4	36	BIAN, VINCENT W	Poolesville High School l	MD
5	36	ZHAO, TONGYU	Beijing New Oriental Foreign Language School at Yangzhou	Jiangsu
6	36	ZHU, YIFAN	Shanghai Foreign Language School	Shanghai
7	35	YANG, HAICHUAN	The High School Affiliated to Renmin University of China	Beijing
8	35	ZHU, JUNZHE	Shanghai Starriver Bilingual School	Shanghai
9	34	CHEN, YAO	Jiangsu Provincial Liangfeng Senior Middle School International Department	Jiangsu
10	34	GONG, KEYUAN	Jiangsu Provincial Liangfeng Senior Middle School International Department	Jiangsu

== 2017 Physics Bowl Winners: Division 2 ==
Rank	Score	Student	School	State
1	40	HUANG, JONATHAN J	University HS - Irvine	CA
2	36	NASH, WILLIAM K	King And Low-Heywood Thomas School	CT
3	34	XIE, CHENGXI	Pomona College	CA
4	34	XU, JACK Y	Ivy Path School	ON
5	34	WANG, YANZHEN	Chengdu Foreign Languages School	Sichuan
6	33	ZHAO, MINGXUAN	Beijing New Oriental Foreign Language School at Yangzhou	Jiangsu
7	32	YI, JOO SUNG	Taft School	CT
8	32	ZHANG, NANQING	Beijing New Oriental Foreign Language School at Yangzhou	Jiangsu
9	31	YE, MING YANG	Bayview Secondary School	ON
10	31	MO, GEORGE B	Bayview Secondary School	ON

== 2016 Physics Bowl Winners: Division 1 ==
Rank	Score	Student	School	State
1	37	LIU, YANWEI	Wuhan Foreign Language School	Hubei
2	36	YAN, YANG	Nanjing Foreign Language School	Jiangsu
3	36	CHEN, PHIL H	University HS	CA
4	36	XU, YUHENG	Olympiads School	ON
5	35	ARRIETA, ANDREW J	Palos Verdes Peninsula High School	CA
6	35	VITTALA, AADITH S	Thomas Jefferson HS for Science and Tech	VA
7	35	ZENGXU, ZHAOQIU	High School Affiliated to Nanjing Normal University	Jiangsu
8	35	MANSOUR, OMAR B	Mentor HS	OH
9	34	MERCHANT, SOPHIE E	Hutchison School	TN
10	34	HANG, YUXIAO	Shandong Experimental High School	Shandong

== 2016 Physics Bowl Winners: Division 2 ==
Rank	Score	Student	School	State
1	40	LU, JASON	Adlai Stevenson High School	IL
2	39	ZHENG, GUO	Olympiads School	ON
3	38	HUANG, JONATHAN J	University HS	CA
4	38	SHANG, JIAXUAN	Yali High School	Hunan
5	38	ZHANG, SHUANGYI	Nanjing Foreign Language School	Jiangsu
6	38	LI, GONGQI	Shenzhen Middle School	Guangdong
7	38	OUYANG, XIAOYI	The First Middle School of Jiujiang Jiangxi Province	Jiangxi
8	37	CHEN, PANYU	High School Affiliated To Nanjing Normal University	Jiangsu
9	37	ZHAI, GAN	Shanghai High School	Shanghai
10	37	LIU, YIRAN	Nanjing Foreign Language School	Jiangsu

== 2015 Physics Bowl Winners: Division 1 ==
Rank	Score	Student	School	State
1	33*	ZHANG, XIAOXUAN	Wuhan Foreign Language School	Hubei
2	33*	LIU, XIAOLING	The Experimental High School Attached To Beijing Normal University	Beijing
3	33	ZHANG, SHUANGYI	Nanjing Foreign Language School	Jiangsu
4	32*	LUO, JINXUAN	Xi'an Gaoxin NO.1 High School	Shaanxi
5	32	XIE, BRIAN B	Mission San Jose High School	CA
6	31*	FENG, SIQIN	Hainan Middle School	Hainan
7	31*	LIU, YIRAN	Nanjing Foreign Language School	Jiangsu
8	31*	GE, LE	The High School Affiliated to Renmin University of China	Beijing
9	31*	REN, TIANSHU	Xi'an Gaoxin NO.1 High School	Shaanxi
10	31*	ZHENG, GEOFFREY	Lincoln Park Academy	FL

== 2015 Physics Bowl Winners: Division 2 ==
Rank	Score	Student	School	State
1	38	SAMINENI, ANEESH V	The King's Academy	CA
2	30*	LU, JASON	Stevenson HS	IL
3	30*	WINER, MIKE H	Montgomery Blair HS	MD
4	30	WANGA, YUANHAO	International Department of the Affiliated High School of SCNU	Guangdong
5	29*	AN, SEUNG HWAN	Olympiad Academia	NY
6	29*	SHI, WENZE	Nanjing Foreign Language School	Jiangsu
7	29	YU, SIQIN	High School Affiliated to Nanjing Normal University	Jiangsu
8	28*	LI, YIMING	Nanjing Foreign Language School	Jiangsu
9	28	QINN, GUANGHUI	The Affiliated High School of Shanxi University	Shanxi
10	27*	GAO, JERRY	Troy High School	MI

- After calculating scores, question difficulty was used as a tie-breaker to determine ranks for students with same scores.

== Scoring ==
The top ten overall students from each division, as well as the first and second place students in each of 14 geographic regions, are reported each year once the tests are all scored (note that all advanced, magnet, or other special science schools are placed in region one, and therefore do not compete in their geographic regions). The top school team scores are also calculated and reported as the sum of the scores of the top five competing students from that school. The average score, out of 40 points, for the 2014 exam was 17.5 points (43.8%) for Division I and 15.7 points (39.3%) for Division II.

Regions for PhysicsBowl as of the 2014 Contest
Region	Geographic Area
01	Specialized Schools of Science, Mathematics, and Technology
02	Connecticut, Maine, Massachusetts, New Hampshire, Rhode Island, Vermont
03	New York, Ontario, Quebec, Newfoundland and Labrador, Prince Edward Island, New Brunswick, Nova Scotia
04	New Jersey, Pennsylvania
05	Delaware, District of Columbia, Maryland, North Carolina, Virginia, West Virginia
06	Florida, Georgia, South Carolina, Puerto Rico, Virgin Islands
07	Indiana, Kentucky, Michigan, Ohio
08	Illinois, Iowa, Wisconsin
09	Arizona, Minnesota, Nebraska, Nevada, New Mexico, North Dakota, South Dakota, Utah, Wyoming
10	Alabama, Arkansas, Colorado, Kansas, Louisiana, Mississippi, Missouri, Oklahoma, Tennessee
11	Texas
12	California with zip codes <= 92500
13	California with zip codes >= 92500
14	Alaska, Alberta, British Columbia, Hawaii, Idaho, Manitoba, Mexico, Montana, Northwest Territories, Nunavut, Saskatchewan, Oregon, Washington, Asia, Europe, and Others

== See also ==
- American Physical Society (APS)
- International Physics Olympiad (IPhO)
- United States National Physics Olympiad
