= George W. Stewart =

American physicist (1876–1956)

George Walter Stewart
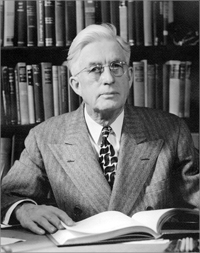
- Born: February 22, 1876; St. Louis, Missouri
- Died: August 16, 1956 (aged 80); Iowa City, Iowa
- Education: Ph.D.
- Alma mater: DePauw University, Cornell University
- Spouse: Zella Mildred White M.D.
- Children: Rodney Cromwell Stewart
- Parents: Oliver Mills Stewart (father); Eleanor Bell (mother)
- Scientific career
- Thesis: The Distribution of Energy in the Spectrum of the Acetylene Flame (1902)
- Notable students: James A. Van Allen; Homer L. Dodge

George W. Stewart (February 22, 1876 – August 16, 1956) was an American acoustician, physicist, and educator. In 1941, Stewart was president of the American Physical Society. He was named emeritus professor of physics at the University of Iowa and was awarded the Oersted Medal in 1943. His research interests included acoustics and X-ray studies of liquids.

== Biography ==
George Walter Stewart was born February 22, 1876, in St. Louis, Missouri, the second son of Oliver Mills Stewart, a Methodist minister, and Eleanor Bell. Stewart attended public schools, starting at Sedalia, Missouri for a year then on to Carthage, Missouri. At the age of nine he transferred to Kansas City, where he graduated from high school at the age of 17. During the following year he worked at a Methodist Book Concern in St. Louis in order to pay for college. Stewart matriculated to DePauw University in Indiana. He received an A.B. degree in 1898 and was Phi Beta Kappa.

After receiving a loan to pay for his education, he entered graduate studies at the Cornell University in 1898. Stewart worked as a graduate assistant in physics from 1898 until 1901. He met and became engaged to Zella Mildred White, a medical student at Cornell. Stewart was elected to Sigma Xi in 1900 and awarded his doctorate in 1901 with a thesis titled, The Distribution of Energy in the Spectrum of the Acetylene Flame. He remained at Cornell as an instructor until 1903.

In 1903, assistant professor Stewart became chair of the small physics department at the University of North Dakota, succeeding C. J. Rollefson. He would become professor of physics in 1904. While at North Dakota, Stewart performed research for the State Oil Inspector. He was married to Dr. White in 1904; the couple would have a son, Rodney Cromwell Stewart. In 1907 he organized the North Dakota Association of Science and Mathematics Teachers. Stewart departed the university in 1909 to become chair of the department of physics at the State University of Iowa (later the University of Iowa), taking over from Karl Eugen Guthe. He was succeeded at North Dakota by Albert H. Taylor.

=== State University of Iowa ===
Among his first duties at Iowa was to oversee the assembly of the physics building, including the planning and construction. His early research studies in physics had been on radiation, but in 1910 he gained an interest in acoustics. When the USA entered World War I in 1917, Stewart was tasked by the National Research Council to develop a method for locating and tracking aircraft. For this purpose, he designed a set of listening horns. However, this study never made it out of the experimental stage, as the military turned to the French for their aircraft sound locator.

Stewart was named acting dean of the graduate college during 1921–1922, in place of Carl E. Seashore who was on leave to Washington D.C. In 1923, he had a university textbook published on the subject of acoustics. Between 1903 and 1926 he would publish 27 papers on the topic. During his research he invented the acoustic filter, and received patents on several designs. Some of these he sold the rights to Bell Telephone Laboratories. He would publish a book called Introductory Acoustics in 1937. However, in 1926 his interests turned to the interaction of X-rays with liquids.

During 1930–1931 he was president of the Sigma Xi scientific honor society. In 1936 he founded a colloquium of college physicists that met each summer in Iowa. This colloquium continued to meet for the duration of his life, and would become his primary interest after his retirement. He was elected to the National Academy of Sciences in 1938, and served as a council member for several years. In July 1941, Stewart was named president of the American Physical Society, taking the place of George B. Pegram who was involved in the American nuclear program. He was nominated for the Oersted Medal by Archie G. Worthing, and received the award in 1943.

His wife, Dr. Zella, died in 1943 and he authored a biography about her that was published the same year. After 35 years as head of the University of Iowa physics department, in February 1946 he gave up the chair and was named professor emeritus. Stewart retired in June and was succeeded by Louis A. Turner. While at Iowa, he had played a role in founding the university's interreligious School of Religion and remained on its board for 25 years. He died on August 16, 1956. Stewart's older brother, Oscar Milton Stewart, was a physicist who obtained his PhD from Cornell University and was later head of the physics department at University of Missouri. His younger brother, Victor was a professional photographer. They had a sister, Mary Morgan Stewart.

== Awards and honors ==
Dr. Stewart was a nationally known physicist and he received multiple honors:

- Honorary Doctor of Science degree from DePauw University (1928)
- Honorary Doctor of Science degree from the University of Pittsburgh (1931)
- Member of the National Academy of Sciences (1938)
- Oersted Medal for Notable Contributions to the Teaching of Physics (1943)
- Honorary Doctor of Science degree from Kalamazoo College (1949)
- The physics building at the University of Iowa has a monument to his name

== Bibliography ==
- Stewart, George Walter (September 1923), Acoustics; a text for students in music, psychology and speech at the University of Iowa, State University of Iowa.
- Stewart, George Walter (1937), Introductory Acoustics, D. Van Nostrand Company, Incorporated.
- Stewart, George Walter (1943), A Biographical Portrait of Zella White Stewart, M.D., Athens Press.
