= Aaron Titus =

American physics professor (born 1971)

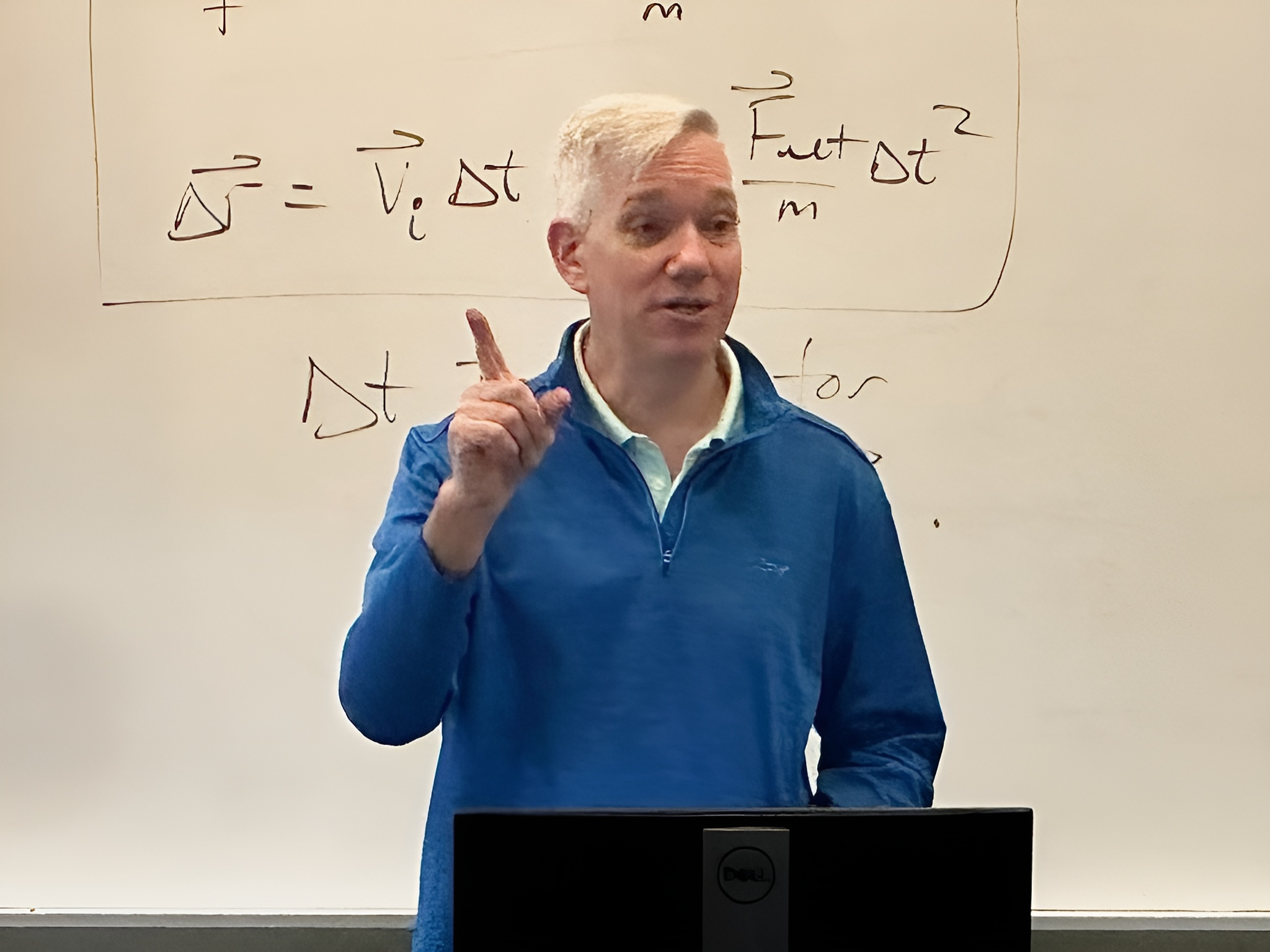
- Titus giving a lecture in 2025
- Born: April 6, 1971 (age 55); Wenatchee, Washington, US
- Occupations: Physicist; Professor; Academic author
- Known for: Co-founder of WebAssign
- Spouse: Kimberly Jo Titus
- Children: 2
- Awards: List of awards and recognition

Academic background
- Education: B.S. in physics (Penn State University); Ph.D. in physics (North Carolina State University)
- Thesis: Integrating video and animation with physics problem-solving exercises on the World Wide Web (1998)

Aaron Patrick Titus (born April 6, 1971) is an American professor of physics at North Carolina State University (NCSU), and co-founder of the online learning and homework service WebAssign. Titus has won multiple teaching awards for his work in tertiary education.

Born in Wenatchee, Washington, he received his B.S. in physics from Penn State University in 1993, married his wife Kimberly Jo Titus (née Gossett) in 1994, and completed his Ph.D. in physics from NCSU in 1998. A year prior, Titus collaborated with North Park University professor Larry Martin to merge each of their respective online learning and homework services together to create WebAssign. Titus then began to teach at North Carolina A&T State University from 1998 to 2002, then at High Point University (HPU) until 2022, and has taught at NCSU since. Titus has started multiple sponsored projects aimed at improving education in targeted areas. At HPU in particular, Titus played a key role in establishing the university's physics major and Department of Physics, serving as the new department's first chair. Titus also co-authored the 5th edition of the introductory calculus-based physics textbook Matter and Interactions, after contributing to the two preceding editions.

Titus received the Meredith Clark Slane Distinguished Teaching Service Award in 2011, the highest teaching distinction at HPU, and the Excellence in Physics Education Award of the American Physical Society in 2019, shared with an eighteen-member Open Source Physics Team.

== Early life and education ==
Aaron Patrick Titus was born on April 6, 1971, in Wenatchee, Washington. During his childhood, Titus lived in several states before settling in Camp Hill, Pennsylvania, where he attended junior high and high school. At 14 years old, Titus became a Christian adhering to Pentecostalism, with his faith later being credited as a major part of his life. After his first physics class in high school, Titus decided he wanted to teach the subject. During his tertiary education, Titus studied for two years at Rochester Institute of Technology before transferring to Penn State University, where he earned a B.S. in physics in 1993. He continued his education to earn a Ph.D. in physics from North Carolina State University (NCSU) in 1998. During the 1990s as a first-year graduate student, Titus met his future wife Kimberly Jo Gossett, a fifth-year graduate student, during a graduate student mixer, where they bonded over similar interests and beliefs. On Valentine's Day in 1994, Titus proposed to Gossett through a letter, which pretended to ask her questions which would prepare her to receive her Ph.D. In reality, the answers spelled out "Will you mar^{2}y me?". In September 1994, Titus married Gossett; they later had two daughters named Melody and Michaela.

== Career ==
=== WebAssign ===
In the past, when professors were hand-grading everything, that was the biggest time constraint. And by the time students got homework back, they might not even remember why they got an answer wrong.

— Aaron Titus, in an interview with AUTM

While studying for his Ph.D. at NCSU in the 1990s, Titus worked as a teaching assistant for physics professor John Risley, who shared Titus's vision for incorporating technology into education. In relation to this, Titus created an online learning and homework service named "PhysWeb" in 1996, a service which included animated demonstrations for solving problems. The service, however, only worked with multiple choice questions. In the summer of 1996, Titus showcased the service at an American Association of Physics Teachers (AAPT) meeting. After the presentation, Titus spoke with a visiting professor from North Park University in Chicago, Illinois, named Larry Martin, who had created an online learning and homework service of his own called "WWWAssign". Martin's service notably generated random numbers for homework questions, allowing students to work together on similar problems, but requiring them to calculate an answer with their own numbers to submit. With both services offering features the other lacked, NCSU recruited Martin for a two-year sabbatical to work with Titus to create a combined service. With the project supervised by Professor Risley, Titus's database structure and Martin's code were combined to co-create the first version of WebAssign in the autumn of 1997. The combined service produced randomized numbers in questions, and allowed students to view upcoming due dates for homework, gain immediate feedback on answers, and access online tutorials for help with problems: features not previously possible through paper homework. Despite only featuring about 1,000 questions total at the time of launch, a number of STEM professors at NCSU adopted the service. Early feedback from professors who pioneered the service helped Titus and Martin find and fix software bugs, including one that allowed infinite submission attempts on questions without penalty.

In 1998, WebAssign was made commercially available to use outside NCSU. In 2002, an academic paper authored by Titus and fellow academic Guo-Qing Tang concluded that WebAssign increased interaction in the classroom. Additionally, the service was found to aid students in their completion of homework outside of the classroom, and instructors in their ability to create assignments based on student feedback. The service remained under NCSU until 2003, when the copyright for some of the service's software code was transferred to its own company named Advanced Instructional Systems Inc., which was headed by Risley as CEO. Since its launch as an independent company the service has expanded and reached a wider audience. By 2011, the service was used by 500,000 students across 1,500 institutions worldwide. In 2023, the Mary Institute and St. Louis Country Day School referred to the service as the "number one homework system used for calculus".

=== Post-1998 and teaching ===
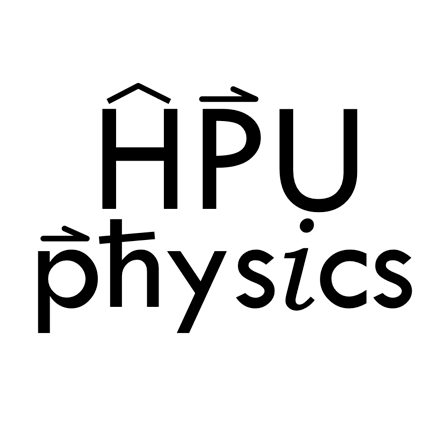
Logo of High Point University's Department of Physics: a department which Titus played a key role in creating while teaching there

At the start of the 1998–99 school year, Titus began teaching as a visiting assistant professor of physics at the College of Arts and Sciences at North Carolina A&T State University, and was promoted to an assistant professor during the following 1999–2000 school year. While teaching at North Carolina A&T, Titus co-wrote a project sponsored by the National Science Foundation which aimed to increase the number of students in STEM majors. At the start of the 2002–03 school year, Titus began work as an assistant professor in physics at High Point University (HPU) in High Point, North Carolina, where he was later joined by his wife. Here, between at least 2005 and 2007, Titus set up interactive exhibits at multiple university-sponsored science fairs for local schools, helping Titus to become a chairman of the Chemistry and Physical Science Department of the university by at least the 2006–07 school year. During this time, Titus also won a competitive grant to create a project designed to provide physics instruction through the use of animations, podcasts, and videos in class.

Titus additionally created both the physics major and Department of Physics at HPU. He likewise served as the new department's first chair, holding the position from at least February 2009 to November 2018. In October 2008 for the 2009–10 school year, Titus was promoted from assistant professor to associate professor of physics and earned academic tenure. In January 2013, Titus was elected to serve as the executive board member representing four-year colleges in the AAPT, a position he held until his term expired in 2016. From at least August 2015 to January 2017, Titus was one of two faculty mentors at HPU who oversaw the student-led construction of a rock-chip sampling device for the primary American space agency NASA. At the start of the 2022–23 school year, Titus moved to NCSU to work as a physics professor for engineering physics. The same school year, Titus presented a training workshop to demonstrate how modern concepts such as machine learning and artificial intelligence can be used in STEM fields. In May 2025, Titus co-authored the 5th Edition of the introductory calculus-based physics textbook Matter and Interactions. Prior to the 5th edition, Titus had co-created solutions for the 3rd and 4th editions of the textbook.

== Awards and recognition ==
Titus has received awards from the physics societies AAPT and the American Physical Society (APS). The AAPT awarded him the "Best Pedagogical Paper" twice, in 2001 and 2011, the "Homer L. Dodge Citation for Distinguished Service" for exceptional contributions to the association in 2019, and the "David Halliday and Robert Resnick Award" for exceptional teaching of undergraduate physics in 2026. In 2019, Titus was one of eighteen members of the Open Source Physics Team which won the "2020 Excellence in Physics Education Award" from the APS for continued commitment to computational physics education.

Titus has also received awards from schools he's taught at, namely HPU and NCSU. He received the "Evening Degree Program Outstanding Faculty Member" award from HPU in 2009, and the "Meredith Clark Slane Distinguished Teaching-Service Award" from HPU in 2011 in recognition of teaching excellence, the highest award for distinguished teaching at the school. Titus also received the "Outstanding Teacher Award" from NCSU in 2025 in recognition of teaching excellence, and as a recipient, also became a member of the "Academy of Outstanding Teachers" at the university.
