= Anthony French =

British-born physicist and educator (1920–2017)

- Born: Anthony Philip French; 19 November 1920; Brighton, England
- Died: 3 February 2017 (aged 96)
- Education: Cambridge University (BA, PhD)
- Spouses: Naomi Livesay (m. 1945; died 2001) Dorothy Jensen (m. 2002)
- Awards: Oersted Medal (1989)
- Scientific career
- Fields: Nuclear physics; Physics education
- Workplaces: Los Alamos Laboratory; Cambridge University; University of South Carolina; Massachusetts Institute of Technology

Anthony Philip French (19 November 1920 – 3 February 2017) was a British physicist. At the time of his death he was professor emeritus of physics at the Massachusetts Institute of Technology.

== Biography ==
French was born on 19 November 1920, in Brighton, England. French won a scholarship to study at Sidney Sussex College, Cambridge, receiving his B.A. in physics in 1942.

In 1942, he was recruited by Egon Bretscher to the British effort to build an atomic bomb (codenamed Tube Alloys) at the Cavendish Laboratory in Cambridge. By 1944, Tube Alloys had been merged with the American Manhattan Project and French was sent to the Los Alamos National Laboratory in New Mexico.

In 1945 he married Los Alamos mathematician Naomi Livesay.

When the war ended, French returned to Cambridge University and the Cavendish Laboratory where he joined the faculty at Pembroke College, becoming a fellow and director of studies in natural sciences. He was awarded a Ph.D. in 1948 based on some of his declassified work from Los Alamos. French also briefly worked at the newly formed Atomic Energy Research Establishment in Harwell, Oxfordshire.

In 1955, French relocated to the University of South Carolina and was soon appointed chair of the physics department. At this time he wrote the textbook Principles of Modern Physics. He left South Carolina in 1962 to take a faculty position in the MIT Physics Department, where he remained until he retired and was named emeritus in 1991. French's main interest was undergraduate physics education. He was chairman of the Commission on Physics Education of the International Union of Pure and Applied Physics (1975–1981) and president of the American Association of Physics Teachers (1985–1986). He was also a Fellow of the American Physical Society.

French's wife Naomi died in 2001. In 2002 he married Dorothy Jensen. French died on 3 February 2017.

== Books ==
- A.P. French, ed. (1988). Physics in a Technological World: XIX General Assembly, International Union of Pure and Applied Physics. American Institute of Physics.
- A. P. French and P. J. Kennedy, ed. (1985). Niels Bohr: A centenary volume. Harvard University Press.
- A. P. French, ed. (1979). Einstein: A centenary volume. Heinemann for the International Commission on Physics Education.
- French, A.P.; Taylor, Edwin F. (1978). Introduction to Quantum Physics. MIT Introductory Physics Series. W.W. Norton & Company.
- French, A.P. (1971). Newtonian Mechanics. MIT Introductory Physics Series. W.W. Norton & Company.
- French, A.P. (1971). Vibrations and Waves. MIT Introductory Physics Series. W.W. Norton & Company. ISBN 9780748744473.
- French, A.P. (1968). Special Relativity. MIT Introductory Physics Series. W.W. Norton & Company. ISBN 9781420074819.
- French, A.P. (1958). Principles of Modern Physics. John Wiley.

== Awards and honors ==
- 1976 Distinguished Service Citation of the American Association of Physics Teachers (AAPT)
- 1980 University Medal of Charles University in Prague
- 1988 Lawrence Bragg Medal of the Institute of Physics, London
- 1989 Oersted Medal of the AAPT
- 1991 Named Professor Emeritus at MIT
- 1993 Melba Newell Phillips Medal of the American Association of Physics Teachers
