= Eleanor C. Sayre =

Eleanor C. Sayre is the Assistant Dean and Director of the Office of Honesty and Integrity for the University of Rochester, and a 2025 recipient of APS's Topical Group on Physics Education Research Fellowship.

Sayre's research focuses on undergraduate students' relationship to certain cultural trademarks of physicists, increased participation of marginalized groups in STEM, the intersection of identity and background as it pertains to an undergraduate STEM education, and professional development for academics.

== Career ==
In 2002, Eleanor C. Sayre received a Bachelor's of Arts in Physics from Grinnell College. In 2005, Sayre received a Master's of Science in Teaching from the University of Maine, where she also received a Doctorate of Philosophy in Physics in 2007. From 2007 to 2009, Sayre was a Postdoctoral Researcher at Ohio State University. From 2009 to 2011, she was a Visiting Teaching Professor and Lilly Teaching Fellow at Wabash College.

Starting in 2011, Sayre was employed as an assistant, associate, and finally full Professor of Physics at Kansas State University. From 2013 to 2013, she was the research director of PhysPort, an AAPT-partnered organization which provides materials for physics pedagogy work.

In 2014, Sayre founded and became co-director of the Professional development for Emerging Education Researchers Institute. From 2017 to 2018, she was a Fulbright Research Chair in STEM Education at the University of Calgary.

From 2019 to 2024, Sayre was a research affiliate at Rochester Institute of Technology's Center for Advanced Scholarship to Transform Learning.

In 2022, Sayre went on leave from KSU in order to be the National Science Foundation's Program Director for the Directorate for STEM Education's Division of Undergraduate Education.

In 2025, she joined the University of Rochester as the Assistant Dean and Director of the Office of Honesty and Integrity.

== Research ==
Eleanor C. Sayre has researched the difference between underclassmen and upperclassmen undergraduate physics student's perception of being a physicist, increasing minority participation in STEM, and is the author of Research: A Practical Handbook, a step-by-step guide for beginning education researchers.

In 2022, Sayre worked on two studies for Physical Review Physics Education Research magazine focusing on student and faculty experiences in physics education, respectively.

In Evaluating the role of student preference in physics lab group equity, Sayre and her co-authors compared broader, systemically documented inequities in physics classrooms with specific student experiences. They concluded that individual student's group preferences do not play a role in lab group inequity. Rather, it is a product of the broader context within which the students and institution in question reside.

Additionally, Sayre and her co-authors found that there is an incongruity between the types of inequities researchers see throughout many classrooms over time, and the types of inequities students in individual classrooms report experiencing.

In Context interactions and physics faculty's professional development: Case study, Sayre and her co-authors monitored two physics instructors from different social and professional contexts through a series of interviews, analyzing their attempts to improve professionally. They concluded that the best methods for physics instructors to improve their practice are heavily context-dependent.

== Selected publications ==
- El-Adawy, S, Huynh, T, Kustusch, MB, and Sayre, E.C. (2022) “Context interactions and physics faculty’s professional development: Case study”. Physical Review Physics Education Research 18 (2), doi:https://doi.org/10.1103/PhysRevPhysEducRes.18.020104
- Zohrabi Alaee, D, Sayre, E.C., Kornick, K, and Franklin, S.V. (2022) “How physics textbooks embed meaning in the equals sign” Physical Review Physics Education Research 90 (4), doi:https://doi.org/10.1119/10.0009096
- Holmes, NG, Heath, G, Hubenig, K, Jeon, S, Kalender, ZY, Stump, E, and Sayre, E.C.. (2022) “Evaluating the role of student preference in physics lab group equity” Physical Review Physics Education Research 18 (1), doi:https://doi.org/10.1103/PhysRevPhysEducRes.18.010106
- Huynh, T., Madsen, AM, McKagan, SB, and Sayre, E.C. (2021) “Building personas from phenomenography: a method for user-centered design in education” Information and Learning Sciences 122 (11-12), doi:https://doi.org/10.1108/ILS-12-2020-0256
- McKagan, SB, Strubbe, LE, Barbato, LJ, Madsen, AM, Sayre, E.C., and Mason, BA (2020) “PhysPort use and growth: Supporting physics teaching with research-based resources since 2011” The Physics Teacher 58 (7), doi:https://doi.org/10.1119/10.0002062
- Strubbe, LE, Madsen, AM, McKagan, SB, and Sayre, E.C. (2020) “Beyond teaching methods: highlighting physics faculty’s strengths and agency” Physical Review Physics Education Research 16 (2), doi:https://doi.org/10.1103/PhysRevPhysEducRes.16.020105
