= Donald F. Holcomb =

Donald Frank Holcomb (November 8, 1925 – August 9, 2018) was an American physicist.

Born in Chesterton, Indiana, on November 8, 1925, Holcomb was raised in primarily in Wood River, Illinois, and graduated from East Alton-Wood River High School in 1943. His university studies were interrupted by military service in the United States Navy. After obtaining a bachelor's degree from DePauw University in 1949, Holcomb pursued graduate study at University of Illinois at Urbana-Champaign, completing a Ph.D. in 1954. He began teaching at Cornell University that same year. In 1964, Holcomb became the third director of the Laboratory of Atomic and Solid State Physics. In his career, Holcomb spent some time abroad. He received a Sloan Research Fellowship from 1955 to 1957, was named a NATO senior visiting fellow at the University of Oslo in 1962, a Guggenheim fellow in 1968 while at the University of Kent, and a Science Research Council visiting fellow at University of St. Andrews in 1978. He was granted fellowship into the American Physical Society and the American Association for the Advancement of Science. In 1987 Holcomb became the president of the American Association of Physics Teachers, which also awarded Holcomb its Oersted Medal in 1996, a year after his retirement from Cornell. He died at home in Ithaca, New York, on August 9, 2018, aged 92.
