= Robert Karplus =

Theoretical physicist (1927–1990)

Robert Karplus (*February 23, 1927 Vienna; † March 20, 1990) was a theoretical physicist and leader in the field of science education.

== Early life ==
Robert Karplus was born in Vienna, where he lived until the German occupation of Austria in 1938. He emigrated with his mother and brother to escape the Anschluss. After a six-month stay in Switzerland, the family moved to the United States and settled in the Boston area. He entered Harvard University in 1943 and completed his Ph.D at the age of twenty-one. His thesis under E. Bright Wilson was on microwave spectroscopy and included both experimental and theoretical work. He was recognized by those he worked with for his brilliance, originality, energy, and cheerful, positive outlook.

His grandfather Johann Paul Karplus (1866–1936) was a highly acclaimed professor of psychiatry at the University of Vienna. He is nephew, by marriage, of the sociologist, philosopher and musicologist Theodor W. Adorno and grandnephew of the physicist Robert von Lieben. His brother is Nobel laureate Martin Karplus, a Harvard chemist.

== Early career in physics ==
After completing his education Karplus worked at the Institute for Advanced Study in Princeton, where he became interested in the developing, but yet untested, theory of quantum electrodynamics (QED). The magnetic moment of the electron had been determined very precisely by means of a variety of experiments, but the best theoretical calculations of this quantity, based on quantum mechanics, were seriously at variance with the experimental results. There was great interest among physicists in knowing whether or not a calculation based on QED would agree with the experimental results, but because of the ambiguities and complexity of QED, no one had so far been able to do such a calculation. Karplus, in collaboration with Norman Kroll, used QED to calculate the value of the magnetic moment of the electron. This was an extremely difficult calculation, requiring more than a year of intense effort from both men; the agreement between their result and the experimental measurements was the first, dramatic confirmation of QED.

Karplus continued his work at the highest level in theoretical physics for more than 10 years, at Harvard from 1950 to 1954 and then at the University of California, Berkeley, publishing 50 research papers, mostly in QED but also in other areas of physics, including the Hall effect, Van Allen radiation, and cosmic rays. He also thoroughly enjoyed experimental work, investigating the chemistry of Land Camera instant pictures and setting up an experimental germanium purification assembly line for transistors. His paper, with J. M. Luttinger, Hall Effect in Ferromagnetics has over 1100 journal citations.

== Family life ==
In 1948, Karplus married Elizabeth Frazier, whom he had met at an international folk dance group he organized while at Harvard. They had seven children born between 1950 and 1962. When the oldest child, Beverly, was 8, Karplus accepted her invitation to present a science lesson on electricity to her third-grade class, using the Wimshurst machine he had inherited from his grandfather. Unfortunately, while the children enjoyed the demonstration, the lesson was a conceptual disaster. This stimulated Karplus to think about how to teach science better, and as the other children entered school, he continued to visit their classes on a "show and tell" basis with various science experiments or demonstrations. Conversing with his children and their classmates, he became increasingly interested in children's learning, reasoning, and science concept development.

His daughter Beverly Karplus Hartline became a noted physicist, science communicator, and academic administrator.

== Second career in science education ==
Within a few years, Karplus had changed careers—from theoretical physics, to research on science and math learning, and then to curriculum developer. Karplus quickly learned what was already known about the development of thinking and reasoning, studying various psychologists, especially Jean Piaget. Characteristically, Karplus also immediately began generating his own questions about children's thinking, collecting evidence, and developing his own interpretations and explanations of what he observed.

Karplus’ new passion coincided, serendipitously, with the post-Sputnik wave of efforts to upgrade US science education. Beginning in the late 50s, many other scientists also devoted themselves to science education and the schools, but Karplus was from the start a leader at the elementary level. Initially there was substantial reluctance at the National Science Foundation (NSF) to fund science curriculum projects at the elementary level, but this was overcome in 1959, when Karplus and three colleagues received the first of many NSF grants for the improvement of science content at the elementary level. This work evolved into a monumental 15-year effort called the Science Curriculum Improvement Study (SCIS). Under the direction of Karplus and Herbert D. Thier, SCIS became a comprehensive, fully tested, hands-on, laboratory-based program in both physical and biological science for grades K-6.

Robert Karplus realized the importance of converting the SCIS elementary science materials into a systematic teaching process that would enable teachers to successfully use these materials while enabling students to learn and enjoy science. He, along with others, developed the learning cycle instructional strategy.

Karplus extended Piaget's theory to college students and adults; Piaget's theory included four stages, and he had documented children's thinking in great detail, finding that most children made the transition from the 3rd stage (concrete operations) to the 4th stage (abstract reasoning) by about 16 years of age. Karplus, however, extended Piaget's methodology to older groups and found that many of these individuals had important gaps in their ability to use abstract reasoning in solving scientific, logical, and mathematical problems. His most famous test of proportional reasoning was the Mr. Tall-Mr. Short problem. Karplus further explored and documented the details of college students’ and adults’ thinking as they confronted the issues involved in this critical intellectual transition, finding that many of the issues and problems that he, Piaget, and others had discovered as critical for younger students were still relevant for older individuals, particularly when they were attempting to solve a problem in a discipline that was new to them.

In 1977 Karplus was elected president of the American Association of Physics Teachers (AAPT), and in 1978 the National Science Teachers Association awarded him their Citation for Distinguished Service to Science Education. Karplus was chairman of the Graduate Group in Science and Mathematics Education (SESAME) from 1978 to 1980. In 1980 he was awarded the AAPT's highest honor, the Oersted Medal, "for his many contributions to physics teaching at all levels and especially for his work in revealing the implications for physics teaching of research in the development of reasoning." Karplus was appointed the dean of the UC Berkeley Graduate School of Education in 1980. The prestigious Karplus Prize in Chemical Physics at Harvard is named after him.

== Later life ==
In June 1982 while jogging at Green Lake in Seattle, Washington, Karplus suffered a severe cardiac arrest that ended his academic career. After an eight-year illness, he died on March 20, 1990.

== Appointments, honors and awards, and books ==
=== Appointments ===
- 1948-50 F. B. Jewett Fellow, Institute of Advanced Study, Princeton University
- 1950-54 Assistant professor of physics, Harvard University
- 1954-58 Associate professor of physics, University of California, Berkeley
- 1958-1982 Professor of Physics, University of California, Berkeley
- 1960-61 Guggenheim Fellow and Fulbright Research Grantee
- 1962-63 Visiting professor, University of Maryland
- 1969-1982 Associate director, Lawrence Hall of Science
- 1973-74 Guggenheim Fellow and visiting professor, M. I. T.
- 1961-77 Director, Science Curriculum Improvement Study
- 1975-1982 Director, Intellectual Development Project
- 1976-77 Acting director, Lawrence Hall of Science
- 1976-1979 Director, CAUSE Project
- 1978-1980 Chairman, Graduate Group in Science and Mathematics Education (SESAME)
- 1980 Dean, School of education, University of California, Berkeley (1)

(1) He resigned as dean within a few weeks when it became clear he would not be allowed to make changes he believed were necessary.

=== Honors and awards ===
- Fellow of American Physical Society
- Distinguished Service Citation, American Association of Physics Teachers, 1972
- National Science Teachers Association Award for Distinguished Service to Science Education, 1978
- President, American Association of Physics Teachers, 1977
- Honorary degree, Doctor of Philosophy, University of Gothenburg, 1980
- Oersted Medal, American Association of Physics Teachers, 1981

=== Books ===
- R. Karplus and H. D. Thier., A New Look at Elementary School Science. Chicago: Rand McNally and Co., 1967.
- R. Karplus, Introductory Physics: A Model Approach. W. A. Benjamin, New York, 1969; reissued in 2003 by Fernand Brunschwig (editor), Captains Engineering Services (publisher).
- R. Karplus (Ed.), Physics and Man, W. A. Benjamin, Inc., New York, 1970.
