= Henry Crew =

American physicist and astronomer (1859-1953)

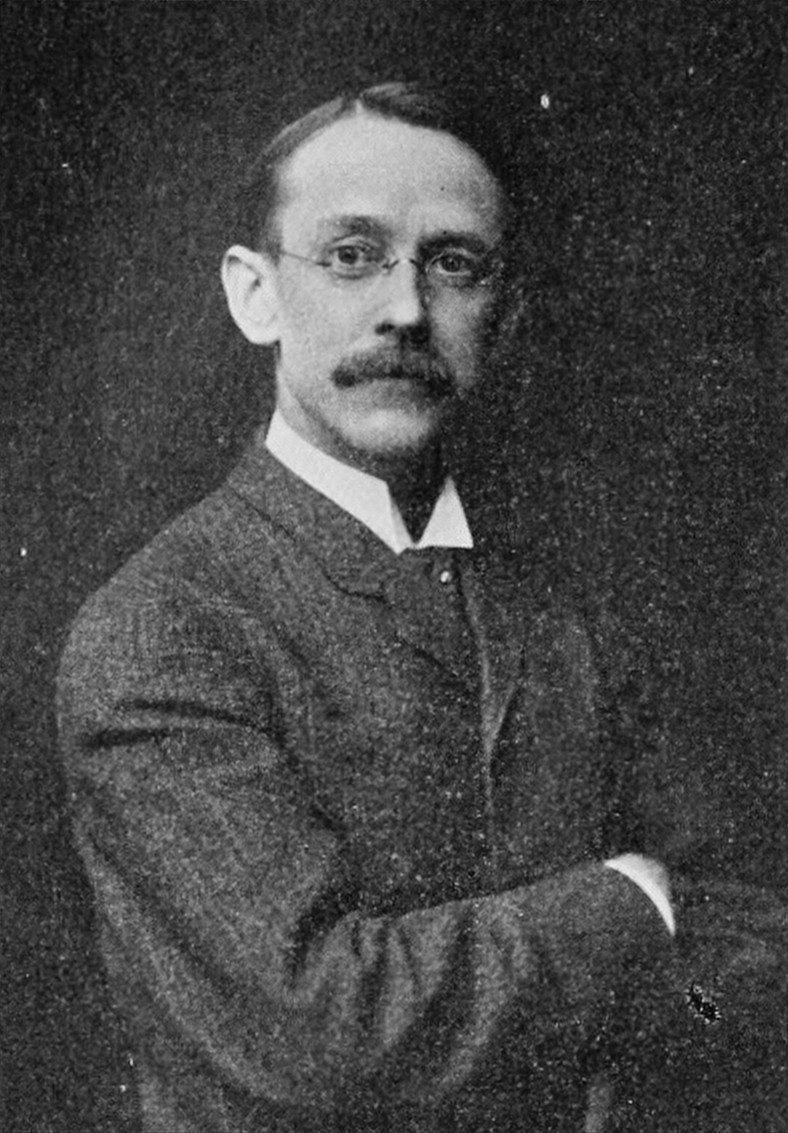
- Born: June 4, 1859; Richmond, Ohio
- Died: February 17, 1953 (aged 93); Evanston, Illinois
- Education: Princeton University (A.B.); Johns Hopkins University (Ph.D.)
- Occupations: Physicist, astronomer
- Spouse: Helen C. Coale
- Children: Alice H., Mildred, William H. Beau crew
- Parent(s): William H. Crew, Deborah Ann
- Awards: Oersted Medal (1941)

Henry Crew (June 4, 1859 – February 17, 1953) was an American physicist and astronomer.

Born in Richmond, Ohio, the son of William H. Crew and Deborah Ann, he attended high school in Wilmington, Ohio then matriculated to Princeton University in 1878. He graduated with an A.B. in physics 1882 and was awarded a graduate fellowship at the university for a year, which he spent at the Princeton laboratory. In 1883 he traveled for a semester overseas to study physics in Berlin, returning in 1884 to attend graduate school at the Johns Hopkins University. Three years later he was awarded a Ph.D. in physics with a thesis on "Doppler Determination of the Rotation Period of the Sun for Various Heliocentric Latitudes."

After a term with an associateship in physics at Johns Hopkins, he became an assistant instructor of physics at Haverford College from 1888–1892. During his last year at Haverford, Henry Crew was married to Helen C. Coale, a graduate of Bryn Mawr College. He then joined the staff of the Lick Observatory in 1892, but soon found himself entangled in the political atmosphere. That year he was awarded the position of Fayerweather professor of physics at Northwestern University, which he accepted. He would remain at that post until he retired 41 years later in 1933. While at Northwestern, he was elected to the United States National Academy of Sciences, the American Academy of Arts and Sciences, and the American Philosophical Society.

In 1930, he was granted leave from Northwestern to accept an appointment at the Century of Progress International Exposition staged in Chicago 1933–1934, where he was chief of the division of basic sciences. Henry had one son and two daughters before his wife died in 1941. His son William H. Crew would himself become a physicist. During his career, Henry wrote a number of works on spectroscopy, the history of science, and biographies of physicists, producing 123 articles and 12 books. He was elected president of the American Physical Society in 1909. In 1914 he published, with Albert De Salvio, an English translation of Galileo's Two New Sciences. He served as the president of the History of Science Society in 1930. In 1941 he was awarded the Oersted Medal by the American Association of Physics Teachers. He was named a Chevalier of the Order of the Crown of Italy, and was awarded an honorary degree from University of Michigan in 1914, then from Princeton in 1922 and Northwestern in 1937.

== Bibliography ==
- A course of eight lectures on electricity (1891)
- Photographic maps of metallic spectra (1895)
- Laboratory instructions in physics (1898)
- The wave theory of light; memoirs by Huygens, Young and Fresnel (1900)
- A laboratory manual of physics for use in high schools (1902)
- The principles of mechanics: for students of physics and engineering (1908)
- Elements of physics: for use in high schools (1909) with Franklin Turner Jones
- General physics: an elementary text-book for colleges (1919)
- The rise of modern physics : a popular sketch (1928)
- Mechanics for students of physics and engineering (1930) with Keith Kuenzi Smith
- Biographical memoir of Thomas Corwin Mendenhall, 1841-1924 (1935)
- Portraits of famous physicists: with biographical accounts (1942)
