= Charles H. Holbrow =

American physicist (1935–2023)

Charles Howard Holbrow
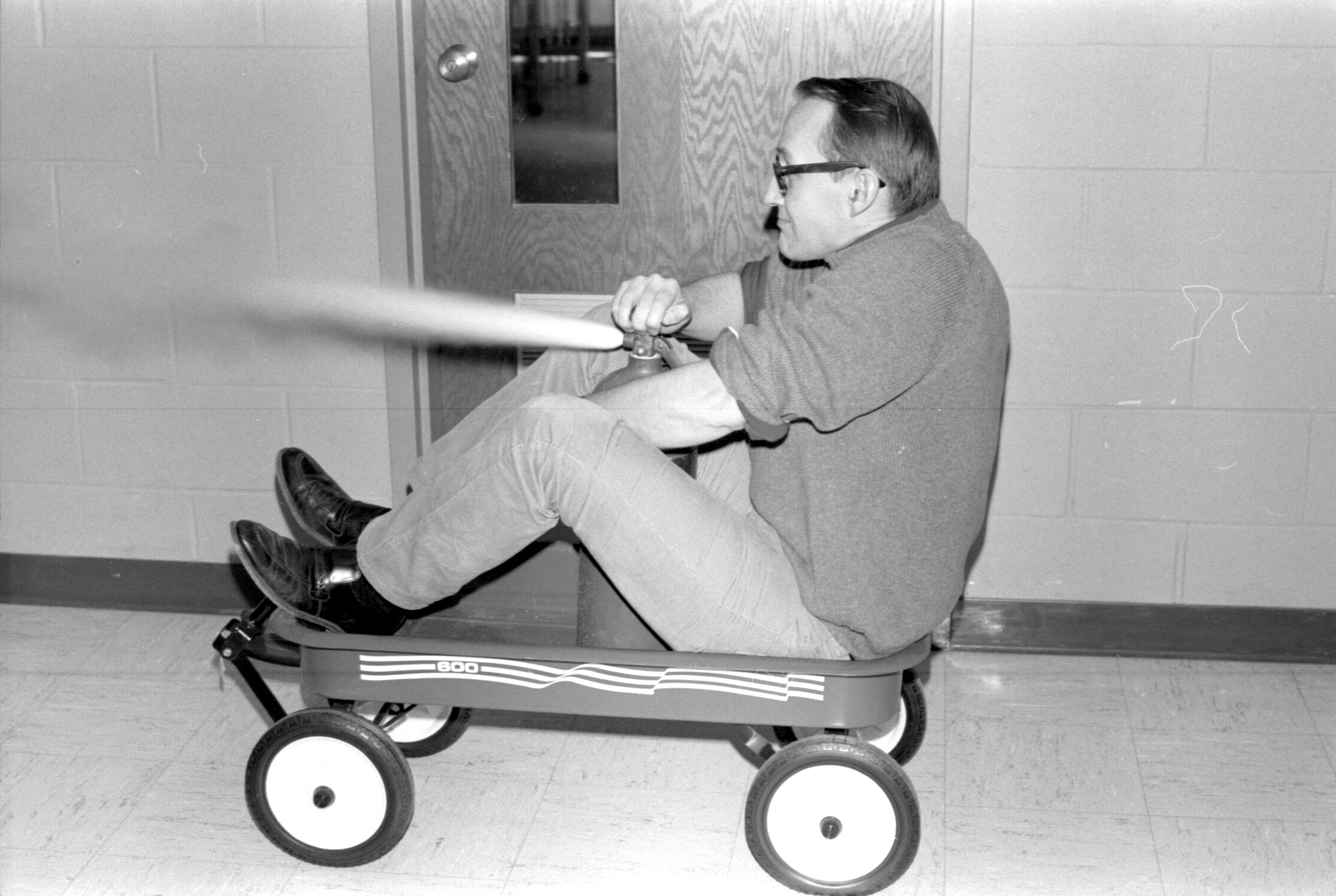
- Holbrow using a fire extinguisher and a wagon to demonstrate rocket propulsion, ca 1980
- Born: September 23, 1935; Melrose, Massachusetts, U.S.
- Died: December 19, 2023 (aged 88); Lexington, Massachusetts, U.S.
- Education: University of Wisconsin-Madison (B.A., M.S., Ph.D.); Columbia University (M.A.)
- Known for: nuclear physics, teaching, history of science, textbook, space colonization
- Scientific career
- Fields: Physics
- Workplaces: Colgate University, Massachusetts Institute of Technology, Cornell University, Brookhaven National Laboratory, Stony Brook University, SRI International, Stanford University, University of Wisconsin-Madison, GSI Helmholtz Centre for Heavy Ion Research, California Institute of Technology, Ames Research Center, University of Vienna, Harvard University
- Doctoral advisor: Henry H. Barschall ("Heinz" Barschall)

Charles H. Holbrow (September 23, 1935 – December 19, 2023) was an American physicist.

== Early life and education ==
Charles Howard Holbrow was born in Melrose, Massachusetts to parents Frederick Holbrow and Florence Louisa (Gile) Holbrow. His earliest memory of interest in physics dates from about age 13, when he saved the money he earned delivering newspapers to buy a book by Robert Andrews Millikan, Electrons (+And -) Protons Photons Neutrons Mesotrons and Cosmic Rays. "I read about two pages, and it made no sense to me whatsoever," he said. "But I still have the book, and now it makes lots of sense."

In 1951, at age 15, he enrolled at the University of Wisconsin-Madison as a Ford Foundation Pre-Induction Fellow. Despite his early interest and intention to major in physics, he found physics coursework so challenging that he changed his major and, in 1955, earned a BA in history instead, then pursued graduate study in history at Columbia University. In 1956, he married Mary Louise Ross, with whom he has five daughters: Gwendolyn Holbrow, Elizabeth, Alice, Katherine and Martha. In 1957, he earned a master's degree in history and Russian studies from Columbia with a master's essay titled Lenin's views of the United States. Inspired by the Sputnik launch, Holbrow then returned to study physics at the University of Wisconsin-Madison, where his doctoral advisor was Henry H. Barschall ("Heinz" Barschall). Holbrow earned his MS in physics in 1960 and PhD in physics in 1963, with the dissertation Neutrons from protons on nickel, rhodium, tantalum, and gold.

== Career ==
After earning his doctorate, Holbrow taught for three years at Haverford College and two years at the University of Pennsylvania, then served as assistant editor at Physics Today. In 1967, he became an associate professor of physics at Colgate University, where he remained for 36 years until his retirement in 2003. In addition to teaching and research, Holbrow was instrumental in establishing first the Colgate Computer Center and later the Department of Computer Science. He became associate director of the Colgate Computer Center and then, in 1968, its director. He was promoted to full professor in 1975 and named Charles A. Dana Professor of Physics in 1986. Holbrow also served as chairman of the Department of Physics and Astronomy, director of Institutional Research, and director of the Division of Mathematics and Natural Sciences.

During his years at Colgate, Holbrow frequently joined other academic institutions temporarily as a visiting professor and researcher, including Stony Brook University, Massachusetts Institute of Technology, Cornell University, Brookhaven National Laboratory, SRI International, Stanford University, the University of Wisconsin-Madison, University of Vienna, and the GSI Helmholtz Centre for Heavy Ion Research. He spent a sabbatical year in 1969-70 at the Stanford Linear Accelerator, and another at the California Institute of Technology in 1975-76, working in the Kellogg Radiation Laboratory. During the summer of 1975, Holbrow was a NASA-ASEE Summer Faculty Fellow at Stanford University and Ames Research Center, where he participated in a NASA project to develop colonies in space, culminating in the report Space Settlements: A Design Study, and featured in an article by Isaac Asimov in the July, 1976, issue of National Geographic.

Throughout his physics career, Holbrow maintained his interest in reading and writing about history. His fascination and feeling of kinship with Danish-born Caltech physicist Charles Christian Lauritsen led to a biographical article, "Charles C. Lauritsen: A Reasonable Man in an Unreasonable World," in Physics in Perspective. During a second stay at Caltech, he wrote a short history of Robert Andrews Millikan and the Kellogg Radiation Laboratory titled "The giant cancer tube and the Kellogg Radiation Laboratory," published in Physics Today.

In addition to physics and history, Holbrow is interested in physics pedagogy. In 1998, he and colleagues at Colgate published a new introductory physics textbook, Modern Introductory Physics, which reversed the usual introductory physics sequence by presenting relativity and quantum theory before mechanics and electromagnetism. A second edition appeared in 2010. He has also served as president of the American Association of Physics Teachers, and was awarded the 2012 Oersted Medal for his major contributions to physics education and research.

Following Holbrow's retirement from Colgate University in 2003, he was a visiting professor of physics at Massachusetts Institute of Technology, where he worked on developing physics MOOCs, and a visiting scholar at Harvard University, where he won an award for excellence in teaching.

Holbrow was also active in the Lexington Computer and Technology Group based in Lexington, Massachusetts and as a member he has given over a dozen presentations on such subjects as Quantum Mechanics/Physics, Lagrangian points, the greenhouse effect on Venus, Arithmetics, Space Colonies in Solar Orbit, and the Manhattan Project.

== Research ==
Holbrow's research included studying the properties of unstable ytterbium atoms produced in a particle accelerator, and using lead ions with only one electron, which share traits with hydrogen, to study relativistic effects.

== Death ==
Holbrow died in Lexington, Massachusetts on December 19, 2023, at the age of 88.

== Awards and honors ==
- National Science Foundation cooperative fellow, 1959-60
- Academic Administration intern, American Council on Education, 1972-73
- National Science Foundation research grantee, 1981-82
- Fellow of the American Physical Society, 1996
- President of the American Association of Physics Teachers, 2003
- Harvard University Certificate of Distinction in Teaching, 2006-2007
- American Association of Physics Teachers Distinguished Service Citation, 2009
- Oersted Medal winner, 2012
- Fellow of the American Association of Physics Teachers, 2014

== Bibliography ==
- Charles H. Holbrow, James N. Lloyd, Joseph. C. Amato, Enrique Galvez, and M. Elizabeth Parks, Modern Introductory Physics, 2nd edition, xxiii, 658 pp., Springer-New York, Inc., (2010).
- Charles H. Holbrow, Allan M. Russell, and Gordon F. Sutton, editors; "Space Colonization: Technology and the Liberal Arts," AIP Conference Proceedings 148, American Institute of Physics, New York, (1986).
- R. Johnson and C. Holbrow, editors, Space Settlements: A Design Study, NASA SP-413, (1977).
