= Larry D. Kirkpatrick =

Larry Dale Kirkpatrick (born February 11, 1941) is an American physicist.

Kirkpatrick was born in the state of Washington in 1941. He studied physics at Washington State University, graduating in 1963, and pursued a doctorate at the Massachusetts Institute of Technology. Upon completing his Ph.D. in 1968, Kirpatrick accepted an assistant professorship at the University of Washington. In 1974, he joined the Montana State University faculty. He was president of the American Association of Physics Teachers in 1999. That same year, Kirkpatrick was elected a fellow of the American Physical Society, "for exceptional contributions to physics education as textbook author, editor/columnist for Quantum magazine, and as coach of the US Physics Olympics Team."
