= Beth Parks =

American physicist

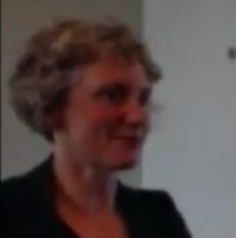
- Beth Parks in 2015
- Born: Mary Elizabeth Lampert; 28 May 1966 (age 60); Huntsville, Alabama
- Citizenship: U.S.A.
- Education: Princeton University, University of California, Berkeley
- Scientific career
- Fields: Physics
- Workplaces: MIT Department of Physics, Colgate University, Mbarara University of Science and Technology
- Thesis: "High frequency electrodynamics of the cuprate superconductors in the vortex state" (1995)
- Doctoral advisor: Joseph Orenstein
- Website: meparks at colgate.edu

Beth Parks is an American physicist. She is a professor in the Department of Physics and Astronomy at Colgate University. She serves as the editor-in-chief of the American Journal of Physics since September 1, 2020. In addition to her research, Parks supports physics education through multiple channels.

== Education and early career ==
Born in Huntsville, Alabama, Parks attended Virgil I. Grissom High School. She earned an AB in physics with a certificate in theater and dance from Princeton University in 1988, an MA (1991) and PhD (1995) in physics, from the University of California at Berkeley. She began her teaching career teaching chemistry at St. Columbkille High School, in Massachusetts, 1988–89. After performing post-doctoral research at the Massachusetts Institute of Technology, she began as a faculty member in the Department of Physics and Astronomy at Colgate University in 1997. Parks is currently a professor.

== Research ==
Her research has used time-domain terahertz spectroscopy to study single-molecule magnets and GHz resonators made from carbon nanotubes. She also has ongoing projects to quantify insulation in buildings and to make solar trackers appropriate for developing nations. Her design mounted solar panels so that they were balanced with a leaking bucket of water. The panels pivoted to face the sun as the leaky bucket reduced in weight during the day.

Parks characterized a diffusion demonstration and studied air pollution in Uganda.

== Contributions to teaching physics ==
Parks has taught physics at the university level for over 20 years. In addition, she co-authored the textbook, Modern Introductory Physics. She is editor-in-chief of the American Journal of Physics, which is the American Association of Physics Teachers’ journal focusing on university-level physics education.

She has explored different methods of teaching physics. For instance, the introductory course on Atoms and Waves was taught in both a standard format and in a "flipped" style. The flipped classes used videos, multiple choice questions, followed by additional clarification videos. Even students in the standard class watched the videos and 85% of the students said they would choose another flipped class.

Parks has taught classes in Fundamental Physics, Atoms and Waves (introductory course for physics & astronomy majors), Mathematical Methods for Physics, Introduction to Quantum Mechanics and Special Relativity, Electromagnetism, Thermodynamics and Statistical Mechanics, Quantum Mechanics, and Solid State Physics. She has also taught courses in broader subjects such as Comparative Energy Policy: U.S. and U.K., Renewable Energy, Environmental Studies Senior Seminar, and Energy and Sustainability.

== Awards and honors ==
- Fulbright Scholar, Mbarara University of Science and Technology in Uganda

== Selected publications ==
- Modern Introductory Physics, 2nd edition, C. H. Holbrow, J. N. Lloyd, J. C. Amato, E. Galvez, and M. E. Parks, Springer, 2010. ISBN 978-0387790794, ISBN 0387790799
- "Research-inspired problems for electricity and magnetism," Beth Parks, American Journal of Physics 74, 351 (2006).March 27, 2006 Virtual Journal of Nanoscale Science and Technology http://www.vjnano.org
- "Photon quantum mechanics and beam splitters," C.H. Holbrow, E. Galvez, M. E. Parks, American Journal of Physics, 70, 260 (2002).
- "Editorial firsts," Beth Parks, American Journal of Physics 88, 791 (2020).
- "Seeking solar rays and illumination in Uganda", an article based on Parks' experience on the Fulbright was published in the Colgate Scene in 2016.
- "Climate teaching tidbits," K. Forinash, R. Tobin, B. Whitten, R. Wolfson, B. Parks Am. J. Phys. 91, 755–756 (2023)
