= Gay Stewart =

American physics educator

Gay Bernadette Stewart is an American physics educator who directs the West Virginia University Center for Excellence in STEM Education, where she is a professor of physics and Eberly Professor of STEM Education. She is a former president of the American Association of Physics Teachers.

== Education and career ==
Stewart studied physics at the University of Arizona, graduating in 1988 with a minor in business. She went to the University of Illinois Urbana-Champaign for graduate study in particle physics, earning a master's degree in 1990 and completing her Ph.D. in 1994. Her dissertation, Search for CP Violation in D-Meson Decays, was supervised by Bob I. Eisenstein.

She became an assistant professor of physics at the University of Arkansas in 1994, and was promoted to associate professor in 2000 and to full professor in 2011. In 2014, she moved to her present position as professor of physics and Eberly Professor of STEM Education at West Virginia University.

== Service ==
Stewart was elected to the presidential chain and served on the board of directors of the American Association of Physics Teachers (AAPT) (president for the 2013–2014 term). She has also served on the board of directors of the American Physical Society (APS), and as co-chair of a redesign of the AP Physics course sequence for the College Board.

== Recognition ==
Stewart was named a Fellow of the American Physical Society in 2009, after a nomination from the APS Forum on Education, "for her work preparing teachers at the University of Arkansas, and for her leadership in the Physics Teacher Education Coalition and on the College Board Advanced Placement Physics Test Development Committee and the AP Physics Redesign Commission".

The University of Arkansas Alumni Association named her as their 2007 teacher of the year. She was the 2019 winner of the Oersted Medal of the AAPT, for "her outstanding, widespread, and lasting impact on the teaching of physics through her pioneering national leadership in physics education, her exceptional service to AAPT, and her mentoring of students and in-service teachers".
