= Hartline =

Hartline may refer to:

- Hartline, Washington, town, United States
- HARTline, the brand name for Hillsborough Area Regional Transit, Florida, United States

== People with the surname ==
- Beverly Karplus Hartline (born 1950), American physicist
- Brian Hartline (born 1986), American football wide receiver
- Haldan Keffer Hartline (1903–1983), American Nobel Prize in Physiology or Medicine winner
- Mary Hartline (1927–2020), American actress
- Mike Hartline (born 1988), American football quarterback
