= Eugen Merzbacher =

American physicist (1921–2013)

Eugen Merzbacher (April 9, 1921 – June 6, 2013) was an American physicist.

== Life and career ==
Merzbacher was born in Berlin. Being a Jew, he emigrated in 1935 with his family from Germany to Turkey, where his father worked as a chemist. He received his licentiate from University of Istanbul in Turkey in 1943 and taught high school in Ankara for the next four years. In 1947, he moved to the United States to attend Harvard University, where he earned his M.A. (1948) and his Ph.D. with Julian Schwinger in 1950. During 1950/51, he worked at the Institute for Advanced Study. In 1951-52, Merzbacher was a visiting assistant professor at Duke University. In 1952, he joined the faculty of the University of North Carolina in Chapel Hill. In 1959/60, he worked at the Institute of Theoretical Physics in Copenhagen, where he became closely acquainted with Niels Bohr; in 1967/68 he was visiting professor at the University of Washington in Seattle. In 1977, he was the recipient of a U. S. Senior Scientist Humboldt Award at the University of Frankfurt. In 1986, he was a visiting research fellow at the Universities of Edinburgh and Stirling in Scotland. He was an active member of the American Physical Society (APS) and in 1990, he served as APS President. In 1991, he was Arnold Bernhard Visiting Professor at Williams College. In 1992, he received the Oersted Medal from the American Association of Physics Teachers. In 2009, Merzbacher was the recipient of the Francis Slack Award from the Southeastern Section of the American Physical Society.

Merzbacher's research was in applications of quantum mechanics to atomic and nuclear collision theory. He was a co-founder of the Triangle Universities Nuclear Laboratory, supported by the U.S. Department of Energy. From 1977 to 1982 he served as chairman of the Department of Physics at the University of North Carolina Chapel Hill (UNC). He was named a Kenan Professor in 1969. He received UNC's 1972 Thomas Jefferson Award.

Merzbacher is probably best known for his influential graduate level quantum mechanics textbook, which has so far seen three editions, the most recent in 1998.

== Personal life ==
He married Ann Townsend Reid and together they had four children: Celia, Charles, Matthew and Mary (deceased). Merzbacher retired in 1991. In 1990, he was president of the American Physical Society. In 1993, UNC presented him with an honorary doctorate in science.

== Books ==
- Quantum Mechanics, John Wiley, 1961, 1970, 3rd edition (completely revised) 1998, ISBN 0-471-88702-1
