= Lewis Carroll Epstein =

American physicist and science writer

- Born: 1937 (age 88–89)
- Writing career
- Subject: physics
- Notable work: Thinking Physics

Lewis Carroll Epstein is the author of layman's books on physics that use an idiosyncratic mix of cartoons and single-page brain teasers to pull the reader into advanced concepts in classical mechanics, quantum theory, and relativity.

His books Thinking Physics and Thinking Physics is Gedanken Physics have been republished for almost 30 years, the former being on the Exploratorium recommended science reading list. He credits his teaching style to experience presenting technical testimony to trial juries and congressional hearings.

== Bibliography ==
=== Non-fiction ===
- Thinking Physics is Gedanken Physics (1979, ISBN 0-935218-06-8)
- Thinking Physics (1981, ISBN 978-0-935218-02-2), co-authored with physicist Paul G. Hewitt
- Thinking Physics, Understandable Practical Reality, Third Edition (2009 ISBN 978-0-935218-08-4), author and illustrator Lewis Carroll Epstein Lewis Carroll Epstein (2009), Thinking physics (Thinking Physics, Third ed.), San Francisco: Insight Press, OL 24234250M
  - translated into German by Hans-Erhard Lessing as Denksport-Physik: Fragen und Antworten
- Relativity Visualized (1984, ISBN 0-935218-03-3), held in over 7000 libraries.
- Relativity Visualized "The Gold Nugget of Relativity Books" (2000, ISBN 978-0-935218-05-3),
  - translated into German edition Relativitätstheorie anschaulich dargestellt : Gedankenexperimente, Zeichnungen, Bilder
