= American Journal of Physics =

Peer-reviewed scientific journal

- Discipline: Physics
- Language: English
- Edited by: Beth Parks

Publication details
- History: 1933–present
- Publisher: American Association of Physics Teachers, American Institute of Physics
- Frequency: Monthly
- Impact factor: 0.9 (2025)

Standard abbreviations
- ISO 4: Am. J. Phys.

Indexing
- CODEN: AJPIAS
- ISSN: 0002-9505 (print); 1943-2909 (web)
- LCCN: 2007233687
- OCLC no.: 1480178

Links
- Journal homepage; Online archive

The American Journal of Physics is a monthly, peer-reviewed scientific journal published by the American Association of Physics Teachers and the American Institute of Physics. The editor-in-chief is Beth Parks of Colgate University.

== Aims and scope ==
The focus of this journal is undergraduate and graduate level physics. The intended audience is college and university physics teachers and students. Coverage includes current research in physics, instructional laboratory equipment, laboratory demonstrations, teaching methodologies, lists of resources, and book reviews. In addition, historical, philosophical and cultural aspects of physics are also covered. According to the 2021 Journal Citation Reports from Clarivate, this journal has a 2025 impact factor of 0.9.

== History ==
The former title of this journal was American Physics Teacher (vol. 1, February 1933) (ISSN 0096-0322). It was a quarterly journal from 1933 to 1936, and then a bimonthly from 1937 to 1939. After volume 7 was published in December 1939, the name of the journal was changed to its current title in February 1940. Hence, the publication begins under its new title with volume 8 in February 1940.

== Abstracting and indexing ==
This journal is indexed in the following databases:

- Abstract Bulletin of the Institute of Paper Chemistry (PAPERCHEM in 1969)
- Applied Science & Technology Index (H.W. Wilson Company)
- Chemical Abstracts
- Computer & Control Abstracts
- Current Index to Journals in Education (CSA Illumina – ERIC database)
- Current Physics Index
- Electrical & Electronics Abstracts
- Energy Research Abstracts
- General Science Index ( H.W. Wilson Company)
- International Aerospace Abstracts
- Mathematical Reviews
- Physics Abstracts. Science Abstracts. Series A
- SPIN

According to the Journal Citation Reports, the journal has a 2023 impact factor of 0.8.

== See also ==
- European Journal of Physics
- The Physics Teacher
