= Betty Karplus =

American science educator

Elizabeth (Betty) Frazier Karplus (1925–2021) was an American science educator, and "a pioneer in protecting rights of students with disabilities".

== Early life and education ==
Elizabeth Frazier was born on March 22, 1925, in Burlington, Vermont, and moved as a child to Connecticut. Her father was a minister for a Congregational church, and she traveled extensively with him on summer ministries to the western US.

She studied physics at Oberlin College, working as a welder to support herself through college. Next, she went to Wellesley College for a master's degree in physics. At Wellesley, she worked as a technical writer for Grace Hopper on the Harvard Mark I project.

== Family life ==
At Wellesley, she met Robert Karplus, then a physics student at Harvard. They married in December 1948, and moved to Princeton, New Jersey, where Robert had come to work at the Institute for Advanced Study. Elizabeth headed the radiochemistry laboratory, and worked evenings as a mathematical calculator for John von Neumann, checking the accuracy of the outputs from his early computer programs.

At Princeton, they had the first of their seven children, Beverly Karplus Hartline (born 1950), later to become a notable physicist herself. Robert Karplus returned to Harvard University later in 1950, and the family moved to Watertown, Massachusetts; a second daughter, Margaret, arrived in 1952.

In 1954, Robert Karplus took a faculty position at the University of California, Berkeley, and moved with his family to the San Francisco Bay Area, where Elizabeth lived for the rest of her life. Initially renting an apartment in Berkeley, California, they moved to Orinda, California, soon after. They had five more children in this time: Richard (born 1953), Barbara (1955), Andrew (1957), David (1960), and Peter (1962).

== Later life and education career ==
Two events in the late 1950s and early 1960s triggered Karplus's move to science education. First, in reaction to the Sputnik crisis of 1957, her husband Robert became interested in elementary school science education, and shifted his own research interests in that direction and away from theoretical physics. He began working with the Elementary School Science Project at UC Berkeley, but soon broke away from it and instead launched the Science Curriculum Improvement Study. Betty Karplus, also, began doing research as part of this study, coauthored with her husband; their joint works "had a lasting impact on the field of science education". The second event was the birth of her youngest son, who had cerebral palsy. The led her to become interested in the education and rights of students with disabilities, and to become involved in local education more broadly.

In the mid-1960s, Karplus began working at Campolindo High School as a substitute science teacher, and earned a teaching credential and a master's degree in special education. As school systems started to provide more substantial resources for disabled student education, she was hired as a full-time resource teacher for students with disabilities. She also served for two terms on the board of the Orinda Union School District, and was named Orinda Citizen of the Year for 1982.

In 1982, her husband had a heart attack, and in 1990 he died. Meanwhile, in 1986, Karplus retired from public school work, and moved to Mills College to lead a teacher training program in science education, as a visiting professor of STEM education. She joined the Peace Corps in 1991, and worked for two years with students with disabilities in Jamaica. She also developed coursework for AmeriCorps and spent another year as an English teacher in China.

== Recognition ==
In 2019, Karplus was named a Fellow of the American Association for the Advancement of Science, "for her exceptional contributions to science education".

== Death ==
She died on September 22, 2021.

== Selected publications ==
- Karplus, Elizabeth F.; Karplus, Robert (1970), "Intellectual development beyond elementary school I—Deductive logic", School Science and Mathematics, 70 (5): 398–406, doi:10.1111/j.1949-8594.1970.tb08657.x
- Karplus, Robert; Karplus, Elizabeth F. (1972), "Intellectual development beyond elementary school III—Ratio: a longitudinal study", School Science and Mathematics, 72 (8): 735–742, doi:10.1111/j.1949-8594.1972.tb08920.x
- Karplus, Elizabeth F.; Karplus, Robert; Wollman, Warren (October 1974), "Intellectual development beyond elementary school IV—Ratio: The influence of cognitive style", School Science and Mathematics, 74 (6): 476–482, doi:10.1111/j.1949-8594.1974.tb08937.x
- Lyon, Lorraine; Karplus, Elizabeth (1980), Math In and Out of the Mainstream, Novato, California: Academic Therapy Publications, ISBN 0-87879-245-7
