= Proportional reasoning =

Reasoning about comparative relationships

Proportional reasoning is the ability to understand and reason about multiplicative relationships between quantities, such as ratios, rates, fractions, and scale factors. It involves recognizing how one quantity changes in relation to another and coordinating these changes as a consistent relationship.

== In mathematics and physics ==
In mathematics and in physics, proportionality is a mathematical relation between two quantities; it can be expressed as an equality of two ratios:

$$\frac{a}{b} = \frac{c}{d}$$

Functionally, proportionality can be a relationship between variables in a mathematical equation. For example, given the following equation for the force of gravity (according to Newton):

$$F = G \frac{m_1 m_2}{r^2}$$

the force of gravity between two masses is directly proportional to the product of the two masses and inversely proportional to the square of the distance between the two masses.

== Intellectual development ==
In Piaget's theory of cognitive development, the fourth and final stage is the formal operational stage. In the classic book "The Growth of Logical Thinking from Childhood to Adolescence" by Jean Piaget and Bärbel Inhelder formal operational reasoning takes many forms, including propositional reasoning, deductive logic, separation and control of variables, combinatorial reasoning, and proportional reasoning. Robert Karplus, a science educator in the 1960s and 1970s, investigated all these forms of reasoning in adolescents & adults. Mr. Tall-Mr.Short was one of his studies.

== Examples ==
=== Inverse Proportion ===
Comparable reasoning patterns exist for inverse proportion.

==== Water Triangle ====
Consider a container of colored liquid inside a right triangle where the triangle can be tilted and the water levels on the left and right side can be measured on a built-in scale. This is called a "water triangle":

The water triangle is rotated until it shows a measurement of 4 units on the left side and 6 units on the right side. Suppose the triangle is tilted even more until the water level on the right side is at 8 units. Predict what the water level in units will be on the left side.

Typical Solutions

Someone with knowledge about the area of triangles might reason: "Initially the area of the water forming the triangle is 12 since 1/2 × 4 × 6 = 12. The amount of water doesn't change so the area won't change. So the answer is 3 because 1/2 × 3 × 8 = 12."

A correct multiplicative answer is relatively rare. By far the most common answer is something like: "2 units because the water level on the right side increased by two units so the water level on the left side must decrease by two units and 4 – 2 = 2." Less frequently the reason for two units is: "Before there is a total of 10 units because 4 + 6 = 10. The total number of units must stay the same so the answer is 2 because 2 + 8 = 10."

Once again, some individuals who have not yet reached the formal operational stage tend to use an additive rather than a multiplicative strategy to solve problems involving inverse proportion. As with direct proportion, this incorrect strategy seems logical to the individual and appears to produce a reasonable answer. Students are often surprised when they perform the experiment and tilt the triangle, discovering that the correct answer is 3 rather than 2, as they had confidently predicted.

=== Viewing these strategies as functional relations ===
Let T be the height of Mr. Tall and S be the height of Mr. Short, then the correct multiplicative strategy can be expressed as T/S = 3/2; this is a constant ratio relation. The incorrect additive strategy can be expressed as T – S = 2; this is a constant difference relation. Here is the graph for these two equations. For the numeric values involved in the problem statement, these graphs are "similar" and it is easy to see why individuals consider their incorrect answers perfectly reasonable.

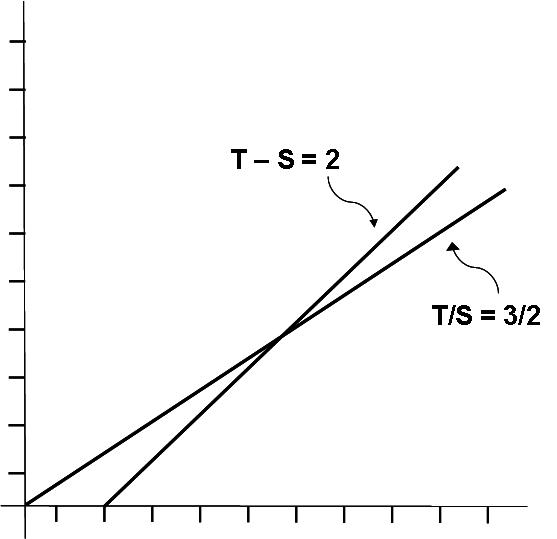

Now consider our inverse proportion using the "water triangle". Let L be the height of the water on the left side and R be the height of the water on the right side, then the correct multiplicative strategy can be expressed as L × R = 24; this is a constant product relation. The incorrect additive strategy can be expressed as L + R = 10; this is a constant sum relation. Here is the graph for these two equations. For the numeric values involved in the problem statement, these graphs are "similar" and it is easy to see why individuals consider their incorrect answers perfectly reasonable.

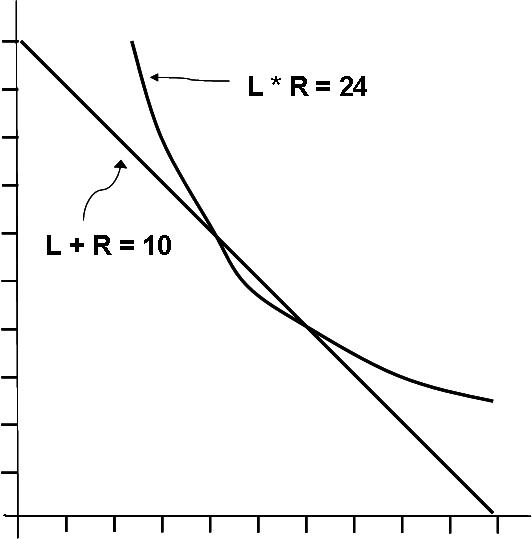

== Teaching for Proportional Reasoning ==
As any experienced teacher will attest, it is not sufficient to simply tell a student his/her answer is incorrect and then instruct the student to use the correct solution. The incorrect strategy has not been "unwired in the brain" and would re-emerge after the current lesson has been completed.

Also the additive strategies noted above cannot simply be labeled as "incorrect" since they do correctly match other real world situations. For example, consider the following problem:

On Independence Day this year Mr. Tall was 6 years old and Mr. Short was 4 years old. On a future Independence Day Mr. Short is 6 years old. How old will Mr. Tall be on that Independence Day?

Similarly the constant sum relation can be correct for some situations. Consider the following problem.

There are four beavers on the left side of a river and six beavers on the right side of the river. At a later time with the same group of beavers there are eight beavers on the right side of the river. How many beavers will there be on the left side?

So there are situations where the additive relations (constant difference and constant sum) are correct and other situations where the multiplicative relations (constant ratio and constant product) are correct.

=== Use of Hands-On Activities and Karplus' Learning Cycle ===
It is critically important that students on their own recognize that their current mode of reasoning, say that it is additive, is inappropriate for a multiplicative problem they are trying to solve. Robert Karplus developed a model of learning he called the learning cycle that facilitates the acquisition of new reasoning skills.

1. The first phase is one of exploration in which students learn through their own actions and reactions with minimal guidance. The learning environment has to be carefully designed to focus student's attention on the relevant issues. Learners may experience some cognitive dissonance if they discover their pre-existing strategy does not match observed results. This may lead to questions that they cannot answer with their present ideas or reasoning patterns.
2. In the second phase the concept is introduced and explained. Here the teacher is more active, and learning is achieved by explanation.
3. Finally, in the third phase, the concept is applied to new situations and its range of applicability is extended. Learning is achieved by repetition and practice so that new ideas and ways of thinking have time to stabilize.

Hands-on activities are extremely useful in the learning cycle. After making predictions about the height of Mr. Tall in paper clips, the measuring tools can be introduced and the students can test their strategies. For the student using a constant difference relation, actual measurement will show that Mr. Tall is actually nine paper clips high and this will set up some cognitive dissonance.

The same is true for the inverse relations. Here is a picture of two students working with the "water triangle". Given the problem noted above, most students predict the water level on the left side will drop to two units when the water triangle is tilted. When they carry out the experiment and see that the answer is 3 units, this establishes some cognitive dissonance. This is a prime time for the teacher to move the lesson into the second stage of the learning cycle.

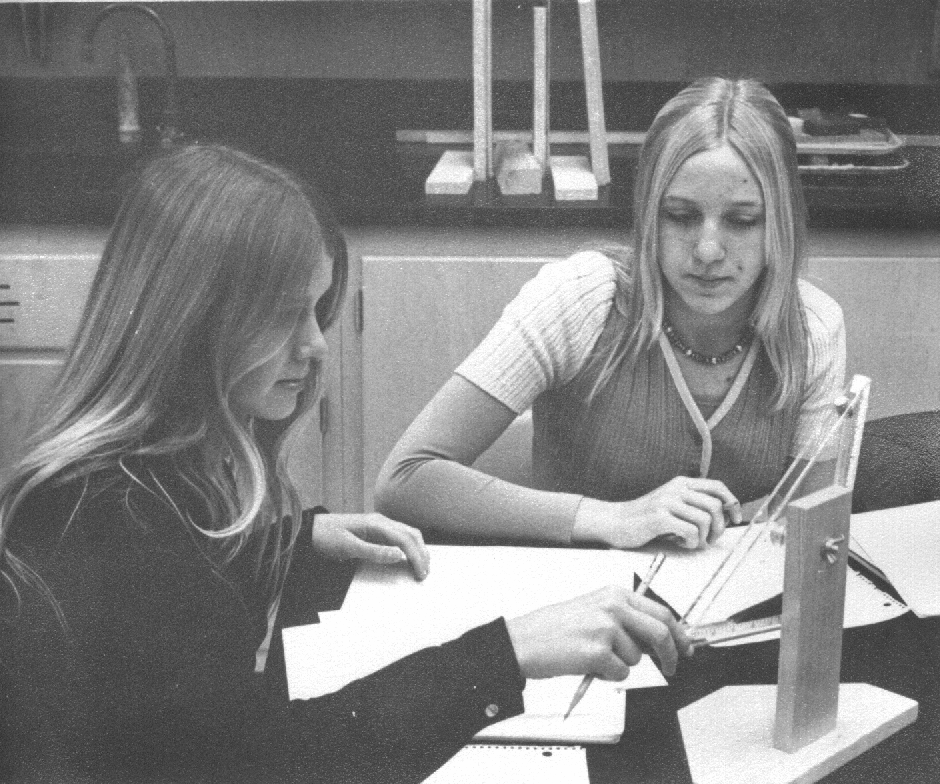

It is important that the students not over apply the multiplicative strategies they learn. Therefore, some of the hands-on activities might not be based on a multiplicative relation. Here is a picture of two students working with an apparatus where the constant sum relation is correct.

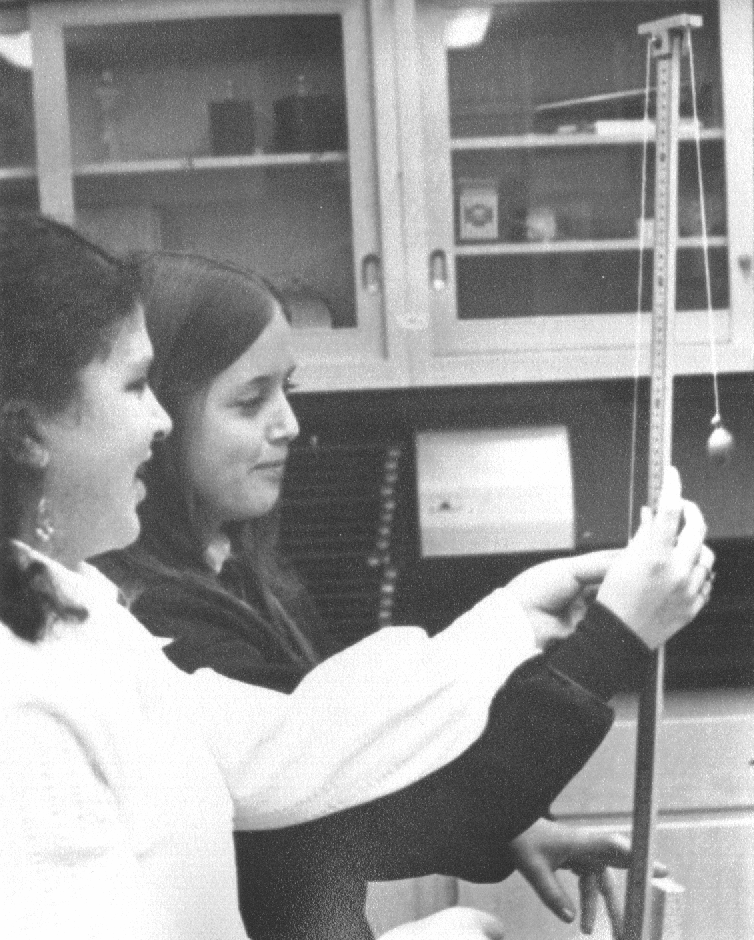

It is not always possible or feasible to put carefully designed hands-on activities into the hands of students. Also, older audiences do not always react well to using hands-on experimentation. However, it is often possible to introduce cognitive dissonance through thought experiments.

=== Determining a Correct Relation Based on Thought Experiments ===
In all the experiments noted above there are two variables whose values change based on a fixed relation. Consider the following problem that is similar to the Mr. Tall and Mr. Short problem.

Here is a photograph of a father and a daughter. In this picture the daughter is 4 cm high and the father is 6 cm high. They decided to enlarge the picture and in the bigger picture the daughter is 6 cm high. How high is the father in the larger picture?

A very common answer for an individual using an additive relation is 8 cm because the father is always 2 cm higher than his daughter. So now ask this student the following question:

Suppose they made a very small version of the original picture and in this small picture the father is 2 cm high. How high will the daughter be in this small picture?

The student quickly realizes that the strategy "the father is always 2 cm higher than his daughter" is not correct. This can also be achieved by exploring the other extreme where the original picture is blown up to poster size and the daughter is 100 cm high. How high will the father be in this poster? A student answering 102 cm realizes that the father and daughter are almost the same height which cannot be right. Once cognitive dissonance is present, the teacher can introduce the correct relation, constant ratio.

The student can also be encouraged to conduct their own thought experiments, such as "what if the height of the daughter doubles in an enlargement, what will happen to the height of the father?" Most students, including those still at the concrete operational stage, will quickly answer that the father's height must also double. The abstract thought experiment is: "Suppose that one of the variables is doubled in value, how will the other variable change?" If the answer is "double", then this may be a constant ratio problem. But if the answer is not double, such as for the age problem with Mr. Tall and Mr. Short given above, then it is not a constant ratio problem.

For inverse relations, such as the "water triangle", limiting cases can also introduce cognitive dissonance. For example:

Given the initial conditions with the water level on the left at 4 units and the water level on the right at 6 units, predict what is the water level on the left if the triangle is tilted until the water level on the right is 10 units.

Students will abandon the additive strategy at this point realizing that 0 cannot be the correct answer. A thought experiment can be performed for inverse relations. If one variable doubles in value, what happens to the other variable? If the answer is 1/2 then this might be a constant product relation (that is, an inverse proportion).

Plotting the values of variables can also be a valuable tool for identifying whether two variables are directly proportional or not. If they are directly proportional, then the values should be on a straight line and that line should intersect the origin.

== Expanding Functional Reasoning ==
The four functional relations noted above, constant sum, constant difference, constant product, and constant ratio, are based on the four arithmetic operations students are most familiar with, namely, addition, subtraction, multiplication and division. Most relations in the real world do not fall into one of these categories. However, if students learn simple techniques such as thought experiments and plotting graphs, they will be able to apply these techniques to more complex situations.

Again, consider Newton's equation for the force of gravity:

$$F = G \frac{m_1 m_2}{r^2}$$

If a student understands the functional relation between the variables, then he/she should be able to answer the following thought experiments.

What would happen to the force of gravitational attraction if:

- one of the masses is doubled?
- one mass doubled and the other mass halved?
- both masses doubled?
- both masses halved?
- the distance between the masses doubled?
- the distance between the masses halved?

Generally, thought experiments must be confirmed by experimental results. Many children and adults when asked to perform a thought experiment on the mass of an object and the velocity with which it falls to the earth might say that when the mass is doubled then the object will fall twice as fast. However, experimental results do not back up this "logical" thought experiment so it is always essential that theoretical results agree with experimental data.
