= European Journal of Physics =

- Discipline: Physics
- Language: English
- Edited by: Stefano Oss

Publication details
- History: 1980–present
- Publisher: IOP Publishing (UK)
- Frequency: 6
- Open access: Hybrid
- Impact factor: 0.9 (2025)

Standard abbreviations
- ISO 4: Eur. J. Phys.

Indexing
- ISSN: 0143-0807 (print); 1361-6404 (web)

Links
- Journal homepage

The European Journal of Physics is a peer-reviewed, scientific journal dedicated to maintaining and improving the standard of physics education in higher education. The journal, published since 1980, is now published by IOP Publishing on behalf of the European Physical Society. The current editor-in-chief is Stefano Oss of the Physics Department, Trento, Italy.

It does not include original research in physics, but rather:

- Surveys of research at a level accessible to students
- Original insights into the derivation of results
- Descriptions of new laboratory exercises
- Scholarly or reflective articles at appropriate levels
- Descriptions of successful original student projects
- Discussions of the history and philosophy of physics.
- Reports of new developments in methods for teaching physics and in the physics curriculum.

The journal had an Impact factor of 0.9 for 2025, according to the Journal Citation Reports. It is indexed in Chemical Abstracts, Engineering Index/Ei Compendex, Web of Science, Inspec, Zentralblatt für Mathematik, and other services.

== See also ==
- American Journal of Physics
- The Physics Teacher
