= Oppenheimer–Phillips process =

Type of nuclear fusion reaction

The Oppenheimer–Phillips process or strip reaction is a type of deuteron-induced nuclear reaction. In this process the neutron half of an energetic deuteron (a stable isotope of hydrogen with one proton and one neutron) fuses with a target nucleus, transmuting the target to a heavier isotope while ejecting a proton. An example is the nuclear transmutation of carbon-12 to carbon-13.

The process allows a nuclear interaction to take place at lower energies than would be expected from a simple calculation of the Coulomb barrier between a deuteron and a target nucleus. This is because, as the deuteron approaches the positively charged target nucleus, it experiences a charge polarization where the "proton-end" faces away from the target and the "neutron-end" faces towards the target. The fusion proceeds when the binding energy of the neutron and the target nucleus exceeds the binding energy of the deuteron itself; the proton formerly in the deuteron is then repelled from the new, heavier, nucleus.

== History ==
An explanation of this effect was published by J. Robert Oppenheimer and Melba Phillips in 1935, considering experiments with the Berkeley cyclotron showing that some elements became radioactive under deuteron bombardment.

== Mechanism ==
During the O–P process, the deuteron's positive charge is spatially polarized, and collects preferentially at one end of the deuteron's density distribution, nominally, the "proton end". As the deuteron approaches the target nucleus, the positive charge is repelled by the electrostatic field until, assuming the incident energy is not sufficient for it to surmount the barrier, the "proton end" approaches to a minimum distance having climbed the Coulomb barrier as far as it can. If the "neutron end" is close enough for the strong nuclear force, which only operates over very short distances, to exceed the repulsive electrostatic force on the "proton end", fusion of a neutron with the target nucleus may begin. The reaction proceeds as follows:

| ^{2}D | + | ^{A}X | → | ^{1}H | + | ^{A+1}X |

In the O-P process, as the neutron fuses to the target nucleus, the deuteron binding force pulls the "proton end" closer than a naked proton could otherwise have approached on its own, increasing the potential energy of the positive charge. As a neutron is captured, a proton is stripped from the complex and is ejected. The proton at this point is able to carry away more than the incident kinetic energy of the deuteron since it has approached the target nucleus more closely than what is possible for an isolated proton with the same incident energy. In such instances, the transmuted nucleus is left in an energy state as if it had fused with a neutron of negative kinetic energy. There is an upper bound of how much energy the proton can be ejected with, set by the ground state of the daughter nucleus.
