= Melba Phillips =

American physicist and science educator

Melba Newell Phillips
- Born: February 1, 1907; Near Hazleton, Gibson County, Indiana
- Died: November 8, 2004 (aged 97); Petersburg, Indiana
- Education: Oakland City University; Battle Creek College; University of California, Berkeley
- Known for: Oppenheimer–Phillips process
- Awards: Oersted Medal (1974)
- Scientific career
- Fields: Nuclear physics
- Workplaces: Brooklyn College; University of Minnesota; Washington University; University of Chicago
- Doctoral advisor: J. Robert Oppenheimer

Melba Newell Phillips (February 1, 1907 – November 8, 2004) was an American physicist and a pioneer science educator. One of the first doctoral students of J. Robert Oppenheimer at the University of California, Berkeley, Phillips completed her PhD in 1933, a time when few women could pursue careers in science. In 1935, Oppenheimer and Phillips published their description of the Oppenheimer–Phillips process, an early contribution to nuclear physics that explained the behavior of accelerated nuclei of radioactive hydrogen atoms. Phillips was also known for her refusal to cooperate with a U.S. Senate judiciary subcommittee's investigation on internal security during the McCarthy era which led to her dismissal from her professorship at Brooklyn College, where she was a professor of science from 1938 until 1952. (The college publicly and personally apologized to Phillips for the dismissal in 1987).

Phillips also taught at the University of Minnesota (1941–44) and served as associate director of a teacher-training institute at Washington University in St. Louis (1957–62) before joining the faculty at the University of Chicago (1962–72) as a professor of physics. During her retirement years, Phillips was a visiting professor at Stony Brook University (1972–75) and taught at the University of Science and Technology of China, Chinese Academy of Sciences (1980) in Beijing. Phillips was a fellow of the American Physical Society and the American Association for the Advancement of Science. In addition to teaching, Phillips co-authored science textbooks and was active in the American Association of Physics Teachers. In 1981, the AAPT established the Melba Newell Phillips Medal in her honor to recognize outstanding service to the organization.

== Early life and education ==
Melba Phillips was born on February 1, 1907, near Hazleton, Gibson County, Indiana. She was the only daughter and eldest of Eilda Elizabeth (Meehan) and Virgil B. Phillips' four children.

Phillips graduated from Union High School in 1922 at the age of fifteen. Intending to become an educator, Phillips studied mathematics at Oakland City College in Indiana, where she earned a bachelor of arts degree in 1926. Afterwards, Phillips taught at her former high school for two years before entering graduate school.

Phillips earned a master's degree in physics from Battle Creek College in Michigan in 1928 and a doctorate in physics (PhD) at the University of California, Berkeley in 1933. She was one of the first doctoral students of J. Robert Oppenheimer, who later became scientific head of the Manhattan Project, the Allied effort to develop the Atomic bomb. In 1935, Oppenheimer and Phillips published their description of the Oppenheimer–Phillips process, which explained the behavior of accelerated nuclei of radioactive, "heavy hydrogen" atoms. The Oppenheimer–Phillips effect was one of the earliest contributions to nuclear physics.

== Career ==
In an era when few women were working as scientists, Phillips became a leading science educator and spent the majority of her career as a professor of physics.

Phillips began teaching during the Great Depression. Initially, she took part-time and temporary positions at Battle Creek College (1928–30) and at Connecticut College for Women (1937–38). Phillips also held postdoctoral fellowships at the University of California and at Bryn Mawr College. In early 1936 the American Association of University Women announced that Philips was the recipient of its Margaret E. Maltby award, one of six women to receive its research fellowships for the 1936–37 academic year. Phillips's research focused on application of quantum mechanics to the study of nuclear physics. Before accepting a full-time faculty position at Brooklyn College in 1938, Phillips worked as a fellow at the Institute for Advanced Study in Princeton, New Jersey.

Except for three years during World War II, when she taught at the University of Minnesota (1941–44), Phillips spent a decade as a professor of physics at Brooklyn College (1938–52). She also conducted research on a part-time basis at the Columbia University Radiation Laboratory. In 1945, while teaching at Brooklyn College, Phillips helped organize the Federation of American Scientists at a meeting held in Washington, D.C.

In 1952 Phillips was summoned to appear before the McCarran Commission, a judiciary subcommittee investigating internal security during the McCarthy era. Although Phillips appeared before a subcommittee hearing in New York and agreed to answer questions relating to her work as a scientist and physics educator, she invoked her Fifth Amendment rights when asked about other topics, including questions about whether she was a member of the Communist party. As a result of her refusal to cooperate with the commission as a matter of principle, Phillips, a highly regarded physics educator, was dismissed from her professorship at Brooklyn College and her part-time position at the Columbia University Radiation Laboratory. She remained unemployed as a college professor for five years.

While unemployed, Phillips lived on her modest savings and co-authored two science textbooks: Principles of Physical Science (1957), with Francis Bonner, and Classical Electricity and Magnetism (1955), with Wolfgang K. H. Panofsky. Both of these publications became standard textbooks in collegiate-level science courses.

Phillips returned to teaching in 1957, when she became associate director of a teacher-training institute at Washington University. Phillips remained at St. Louis until 1962, when she joined the faculty at the University of Chicago as a professor of physics. Under her guidance the university began teaching physical science courses to non-science majors. She also made laboratory work part of its curriculum. Phillips retired as a professor emerita from the University of Chicago in 1972, but continued to teach elsewhere.

Philips was active in the American Association of Physics Teachers throughout her career. She became a member of the AAPT in 1943 and served as its first woman president (1966–67). She also co-edited the organization's official history. In addition, Phillips served on the Commission in College Physics (1960–68) and on the advisory board of the School of Mathematics Study Group (1964–67). For her service to the field of science education, Phillips was elected a fellow of the American Physical Society and the American Association for the Advancement of Science.

== McCarran Commission ==
During the early Cold War, the Red Scare in the United States led to widespread accusations of disloyalty. As part of this activity, Senator McCarran headed the Senate Internal Security Subcommittee which called Phillips to testify. Phillips worked not only with Robert Oppenheimer on nuclear physics and the Oppenheimer–Phillips process, but also worked with the Teachers' Union. When questioned about whether she was involved with the Communist party, Phillips chose to neither confirm or deny, but to simply state that her lineage goes back just as far as any other American.

== Later years ==
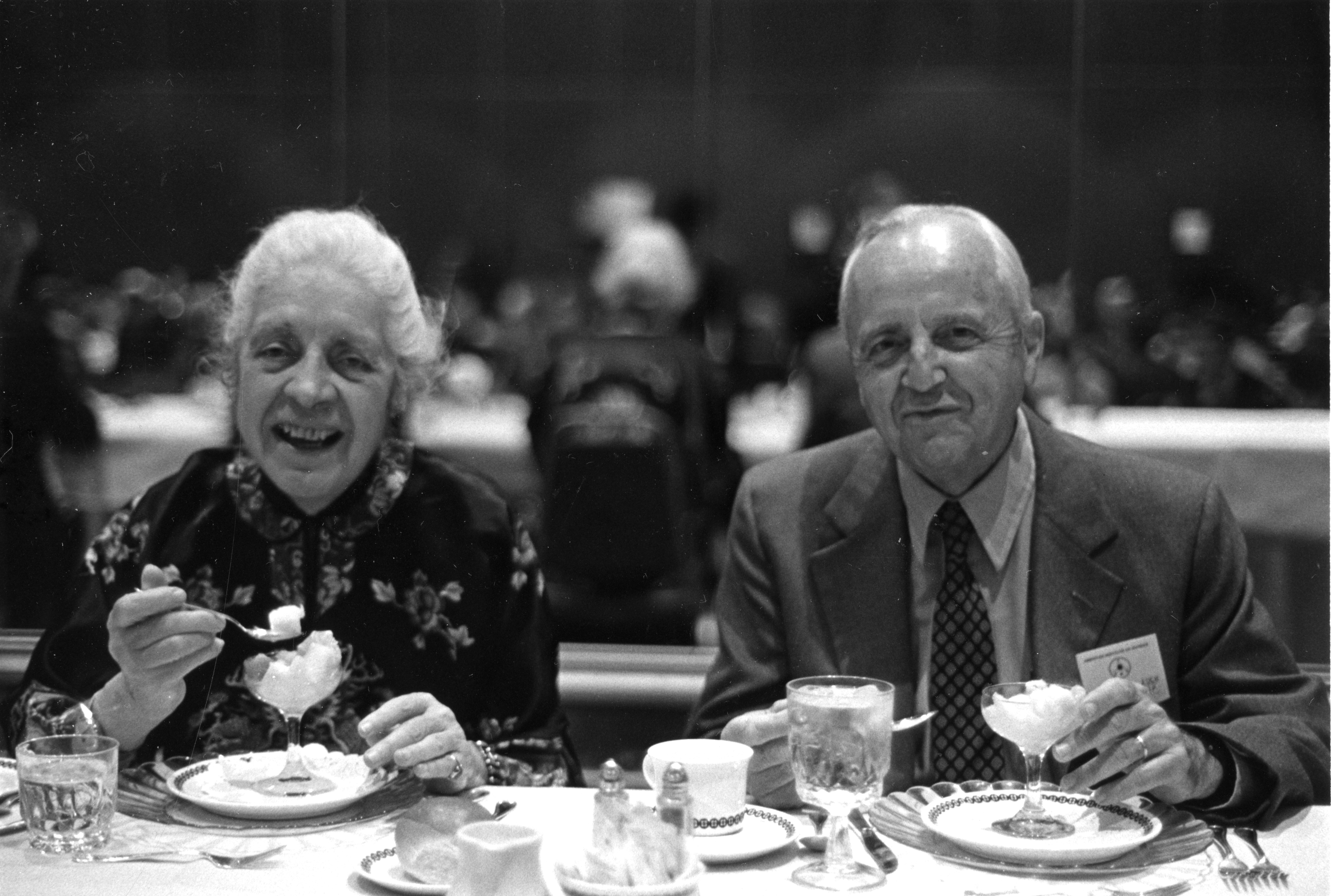
Melba Phillips and Herman William Koch eating ice cream at an AIP Corporate Associates Meeting 1982

After she retired from the University of Chicago in 1972, Phillips continued teaching as a visiting professor at Stony Brook University (1972–75) and at the graduate school of the University of Science and Technology of China, Chinese Academy of Sciences, in Beijing in 1980.

In 1987 Brooklyn College publicly and personally apologized to Phillips for her dismissal from the college in 1952.

== Death and legacy ==
Phillips died of coronary artery disease on November 8, 2004, at the age of ninety-seven, at Amber Manor nursing home in Petersburg, Indiana.

As a leading physics educator of her era, Phillips received numerous citations and awards for her contributions to science education. Phillips is especially noted for developing and implementing a curriculum for teaching physics and co-authoring two textbooks in the 1950s for collegiate physics courses. She also wrote and edited works history of physics and the history of the American Association of Physics Teachers.

== Honors and tributes ==
- Member, Phi Beta Kappa.
- Fellow, American Physical Society and the American Association for the Advancement of Science.
- In 1974 Phillips was awarded the Oersted Medal from the American Association of Physics Teachers; she was also the recipient of the AAPT's Distinguished Service Citation in 1963.
- Phillips became the first recipient of the Melba Newell Phillips Medal, an award that the AAPT established in 1981. The medal is periodically presented to AAPT members "who have provided creative leadership and dedicated service that resulted in exceptional contributions to AAPT."
- In 1981 Phillips received the Karl Taylor Compton Award from the American Institute of Physics.
- In 1988 she was the recipient of Vanderbilt University's Guy and Rebecca Forman Award for Outstanding Teaching in Undergraduate Physics.
- In 1997 Brooklyn College established a scholarship in her honor.
- In 2003 the American Physical Society awarded its Joseph Burton Forum Award to Phillips for her contributions to science education, her role in founding the Federation of American Scientists, and as service as a role model "of a principled scientist."

== Selected published works ==
- Principles of Physical Science, co-authored with Francis Bonner (Addison-Wesley Publishing Company, 1957)
- Classical Electricity and Magnetism, co-authored with Wolfgang Panofsky (1957)
- Principles of Electrodynamics and Relativity, co-authored with P. G. Bergmann (1962)
- On Teaching Physics: Reprints of American Journal of Physics Articles from the First Half Century of AAPT (American Association of Physics Teachers, 1979)
- Physics History from AAPT Journals (American Association of Physics Teachers, 1985)
- History of Physics (Readings from Physics Today, No 2) (American Institute of Physics, 1985)
- History of Physics II: The Life and Times of Modern Physics (Readings from Physics Today, No 5). (American Institute of Physics, 1992)

== See also ==
- Panofsky–Phillips equations
- List of textbooks in electromagnetism
