= Oersted Medal =

Physics education award

The Oersted Medal recognizes notable contributions to the teaching of physics. Established in 1936, it is awarded by the American Association of Physics Teachers. The award is named for Hans Christian Ørsted. It is the Association's most prestigious award.

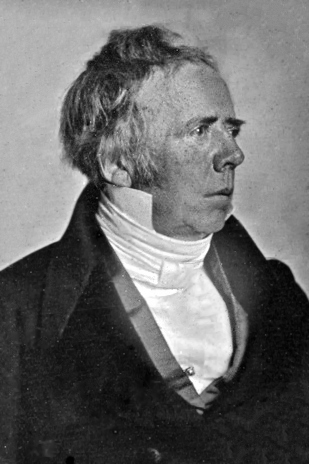
Hans Christian Ørsted

Well-known recipients include Nobel laureates Robert Andrews Millikan, Edward M. Purcell, Richard Feynman, Isidor I. Rabi, Norman F. Ramsey, Hans Bethe, and Carl Wieman; as well as Arnold Sommerfeld, George Uhlenbeck, Jerrold Zacharias, Philip Morrison, Melba Phillips, Victor Weisskopf, Gerald Holton, John A. Wheeler, Frank Oppenheimer, Robert Resnick, Carl Sagan, Freeman Dyson, Daniel Kleppner, Lawrence Krauss, Anthony French, David Hestenes, Robert Karplus, Robert Pohl, Francis Sears.

== Medalists ==
- William Suddards Franklin – 1936
- Edwin Herbert Hall – 1937
- Alexander Wilmer Duff – 1938
- Benjamin Harrison Brown – 1939
- Robert Andrews Millikan – 1940
- Henry Crew – 1941
- not awarded in 1942
- George Walter Stewart – 1943
- Roland Roy Tileston – 1944
- Homer Levi Dodge – 1945
- Ray Lee Edwards – 1946
- Duane Roller – 1947
- William Harley Barber – 1948
- Arnold Sommerfeld – 1949
- Orrin H. Smith – 1950
- John Wesley Hornbeck – 1951
- Ansel A. Knowlton – 1952
- Richard M. Sutton – 1953
- Clifford N. Wall – 1954
- Vernet E. Eaton – 1955
- George E. Uhlenbeck – 1956
- Mark W. Zemansky – 1957
- Jay William Buchta – 1958
- Paul Kirkpatrick – 1959
- Robert W. Pohl – 1960
- Jerrold R. Zacharias – 1961
- Francis W. Sears – 1962
- Francis L. Friedman – 1963
- Walter Christian Michels – 1964
- Philip Morrison – 1965
- Leonard I. Schiff – 1966
- Edward M. Purcell – 1967
- Harvey E. White – 1968
- Eric M. Rogers – 1969
- Edwin C. Kemble – 1970
- Uri Haber-Schaim – 1971
- Richard P. Feynman – 1972
- Arnold Arons – 1973
- Melba N. Phillips – 1974
- Robert Resnick – 1975
- Victor F. Weisskopf – 1976
- H. Richard Crane – 1977
- Wallace A. Hilton – 1978
- Charles Kittel – 1979
- Paul E. Klopsteg – 1979, Extraordinary Oersted Medal Award
- Gerald Holton – 1980
- Robert Karplus – 1981
- I. I. Rabi – 1982
- John A. Wheeler – 1983
- Frank Oppenheimer – 1984
- Sam Treiman – 1985
- Stanley S. Ballard – 1986
- Clifford E. Swartz – 1987
- Norman F. Ramsey – 1988
- Anthony P. French – 1989
- Carl E. Sagan – 1990
- Freeman Dyson – 1991
- Eugen Merzbacher – 1992
- Hans A. Bethe – 1993
- E. Leonard Jossem – 1994
- Robert Beck Clark – 1995
- Donald F. Holcomb – 1996
- Daniel Kleppner – 1997
- Edwin F. Taylor – 1998
- David L. Goodstein – 1999
- John G. King – 2000
- Lillian C. McDermott – 2001
- David Hestenes – 2002
- Edward W. Kolb – 2003
- Lawrence Krauss – 2004
- Eugene D. Commins – 2005
- Kenneth W. Ford – 2006
- Carl Wieman – 2007
- Mildred S. Dresselhaus – 2008
- George Smoot – 2009
- Not Awarded – 2010
- F. James Rutherford – 2011
- Charles H. Holbrow – 2012
- Edward F. Redish – 2013
- Dean Zollman – 2014
- Karl C. Mamola – 2015
- John Winston Belcher – 2016
- Jan Tobochnik - 2017
- Barbara L. Whitten - 2018
- Gay Stewart - 2019
- David Sokoloff - 2020
- Shirley Ann Jackson - 2021
- S. James Gates - 2023
- Laura H. Greene - 2024
- Fred M. Goldberg - 2025
- Ruth Chabay and Bruce A. Sherwood - 2026

== See also ==
- List of physics awards
