= Barbara Whitten =

American physics educator

Barbara Lu Whitten (also published as Barbara Lu Whitten Wolfe) is a retired American physics educator and professor emerita of physics at Colorado College. She is known for encouraging women in physics, for studying the factors that lead to the success of women in physics, and for promoting inclusive teaching strategies in physics; she has also worked in computational environmental physics.

== Education and career ==
Whitten "fell madly in love" with physics at age 16, and graduated from Carleton College in 1968. She received a Ph.D. in physics from the University of Rochester in 1977, with the dissertation On Mechanical Quantum Measuring Processes, supervised by Gérard G. Emch. Her doctoral research applied algebraic statistical mechanics to computational atomic physics, a combination of topics she continued to study for many years.

After teaching at Miami University and working as a researcher at the Lawrence Livermore National Laboratory, she joined the Physics Department at Colorado College as the first woman in its faculty. She retired in 2017.

== Recognition ==
Whitten is the 2018 recipient of the Oersted Medal of the American Association of Physics Teachers.
