= The Physics Teacher =

- Discipline: Physics and math education
- Language: English
- Edited by: Gary White

Publication details
- History: 1963–present
- Publisher: AIP Publishing on behalf of the American Association of Physics Teachers (United States)
- Impact factor: 0.566 (2021)

Standard abbreviations
- ISO 4: Phys. Teach.

Indexing
- CODEN: PHTEAH
- ISSN: 0031-921X
- LCCN: 66084757
- OCLC no.: 1715336

Links
- Journal homepage; Online access

The Physics Teacher is a peer-reviewed academic journal published by AIP Publishing on behalf of the American Association of Physics Teachers covering the history and philosophy of physics, applied physics, physics education (curriculum developments, pedagogy, instructional lab equipment, etc.), and book reviews. It was established in 1963 and the current editor-in-chief is Gary White (George Washington University). Paul G. Hewitt is a regular contributor to The Physics Teacher.

== See also ==
- American Journal of Physics
- European Journal of Physics
