= Archie G. Worthing =

American physicist

- Born: February 6, 1881; LeRoy, Wisconsin
- Died: July 30, 1949 (aged 68)
- Education: Ph.D. (1911)
- Alma mater: University of Wisconsin, University of Michigan
- Spouse: Exie Lillian Witherbee
- Children: Marion, Helen, Robert
- Parents: Arthur James Worthing (father); Loella McNight (mother)
- Scientific career
- Fields: Physics
- Institutions: Nela Research Labs; University of Pittsburgh
- Thesis: Some Thermodynamic Properties of Air and of Carbon

Archie Garfield Worthing (February 6, 1881 – July 30, 1949) was an American physicist. Starting in 1925 he served as head of the physics department at the University of Pittsburgh, and was president of the Optical Society of America during 1941–42.

== Biography ==
Worthing was born on February 6, 1881, in LeRoy, Wisconsin, the son of Arthur James Worthing and Loella McNight. In 1900, he graduated from the State Normal School in Oshkosh, Wisconsin, then taught grammar school in Brandon, Wisconsin during 1900–1901 to earn enough money to attend college. Worthing matriculated to the University of Wisconsin, graduating with a B.A. in 1904. In 1905 he was married to Exie Lillian Witherbee; they would have three children: Marion, Helen, and Robert.

He worked as a physics assistant at the University of Wisconsin from 1904 until 1906, then as an acting instructor in physics at the State University of Iowa (SUI) until 1909. Having earned enough money, he attended SUI graduate school starting in 1908, then studied for his Ph.D. at the University of Michigan. He received his doctorate in 1911 with a thesis titled, Some Thermodynamic Properties of Air and of Carbon.

In 1911 he joined the physical lab at the newly created National Lamp Works as an associate physicist. This facility was renamed the NELA Research Labs in 1914, where Worthing was now a physicist. During World War I the laboratory was tasked with designing lamps for the military, including a trench signaling lamp. Worthing spent nearly 10–12 months working on this project. He would spend fifteen years at the laboratory and gained a reputation for his investigation into the properties of tungsten at high temperatures. He published a paper on the subject with William E. Forsythe in 1925.

He became head of the physics department at the University of Pittsburgh in 1925, succeeding Lee Paul Sieg. During 1925 and 1927 he helped produce several radio talks on the subject of modern physics and artificial lamps. In 1941 he served as president of the American Association of Physics Teachers. He was president of the Optical Society of America during 1941–42. Four days after an abdominal operation, Worthing died on Saturday, July 30, 1949, at the age of 68.

== Bibliography ==
- Forsythe, W. E.; Worthing, A. G. (April 1925). "The Properties of Tungsten and the Characteristics of Tungsten Lamps". Astrophysical Journal. 61: 146. Bibcode:1925ApJ....61..146F. doi:10.1086/142880.
- Worthing, Archie G.; Halliday, David (1948). Heat. New York: J. Wiley.
- Worthing, Archie G.; Geffner, Joseph (1943). Treatment of experimental data. New York, London: J. Wiley & Sons, inc.
- Blackwood, Oswald H.; Hutchisson, Elmer; Osgood, Thomas H.; Ruark, Arthur E.; St. Peter, Wilfred N.; Scott, George A.; Worthing, Archie G. (1933). An Outline of Atomic Physics. New York: John Wiley & Sons, inc.

== See also ==
- Optical Society of America#Past Presidents of the OSA
