= Naomi Livesay =

American mathematician (1916–2001)

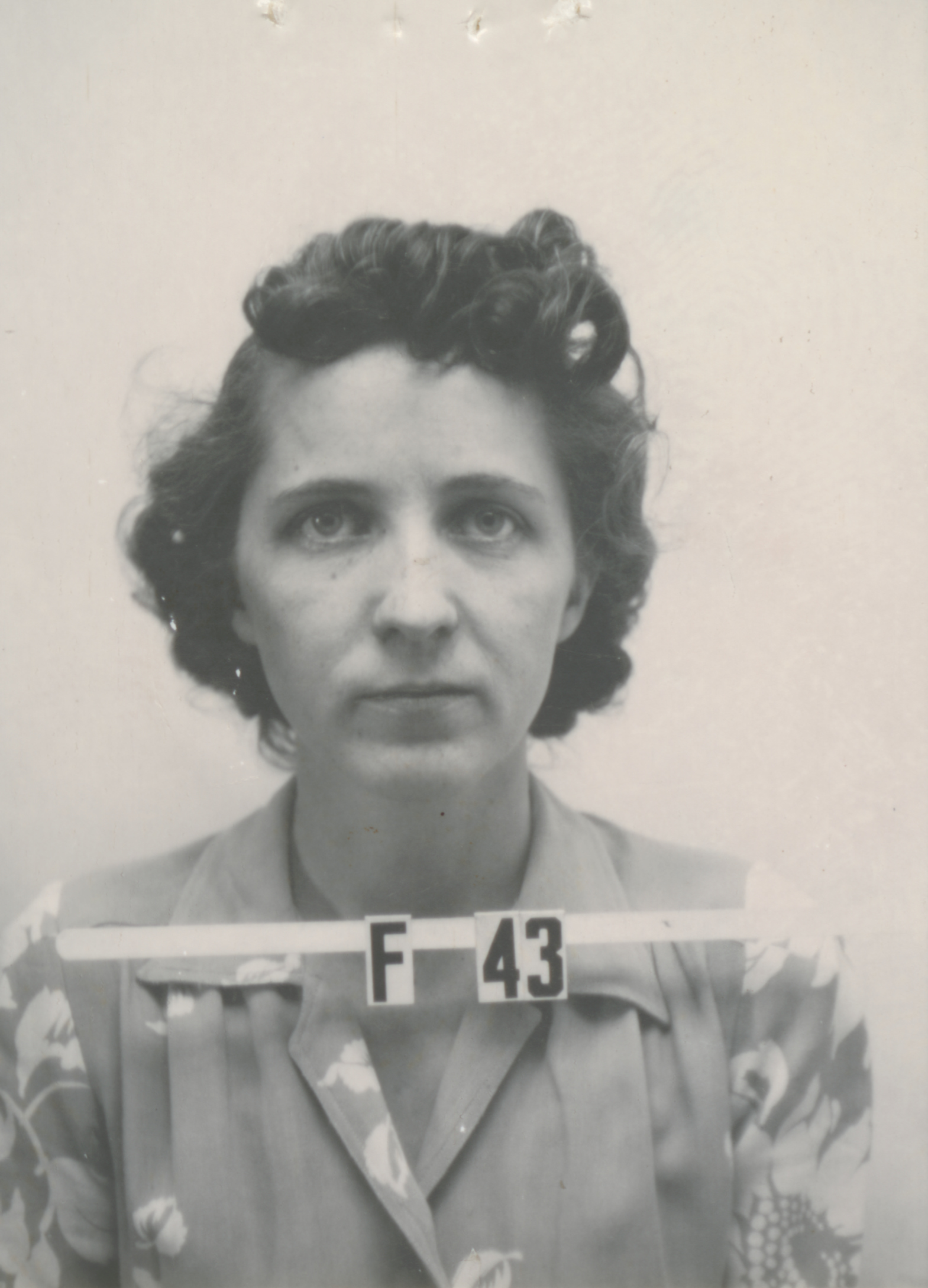
- Photograph for Livesay's 1940s identification badge
- Born: Naomi Mary Livesay; 1916; Montana, U.S.
- Died: March 6, 2001 (aged 84–85); Arlington, Massachusetts, U.S.
- Other name: Naomi Livesay French
- Education: University of Wisconsin (PhM, 1939)
- Spouse: Anthony French
- Scientific career
- Fields: Mathematics
- Workplaces: Manhattan Project; University of Illinois; Princeton University

Naomi Livesay (1916 – 2001) was an American mathematician who contributed to the Manhattan Project. She received her bachelor's degree in mathematics from Cornell College in Iowa and went on to receive a Ph.M. in mathematics from the University of Wisconsin in 1939. Livesay worked on the Manhattan Project at Los Alamos from 1944-1946 where she was assigned to calculate the predicted shockwave propulsion from an implosion type bomb.

== Early life and education ==
Naomi Mary Livesay was born in northern Montana in 1916. She earned her B.A. in mathematics from Cornell College in Iowa and was elected to Phi Beta Kappa. Afterwards, she went on to the University of Wisconsin where she was a research assistant in the education department. Due to discrimination against women at the school, she was prevented from pursuing her Ph.D. Instead she earned her Ph.M. in mathematics in 1939.

== Career ==
Upon receiving her Ph.M. in mathematics, Livesay worked at Princeton University's School of Public and International Affairs where she worked for Princeton Surveys, calculating statistics regarding the costs of state and local governments. She went to Philadelphia where she was trained in the operation and programming of IBM Punch-Card Accounting Machines (PCAMs). She had an assistant and designed plug-board programs for the device for six months. Livesay then received a Rockefeller Foundation fellowship to study education at the University of Chicago. She worked with Bruno Bettelheim and George Sheviakov on a psychology project.

Shortly after, in fall 1940, she began assistant teaching at the University of Illinois, where she was promoted to a full-time instructor the following academic year.

=== Manhattan Project ===
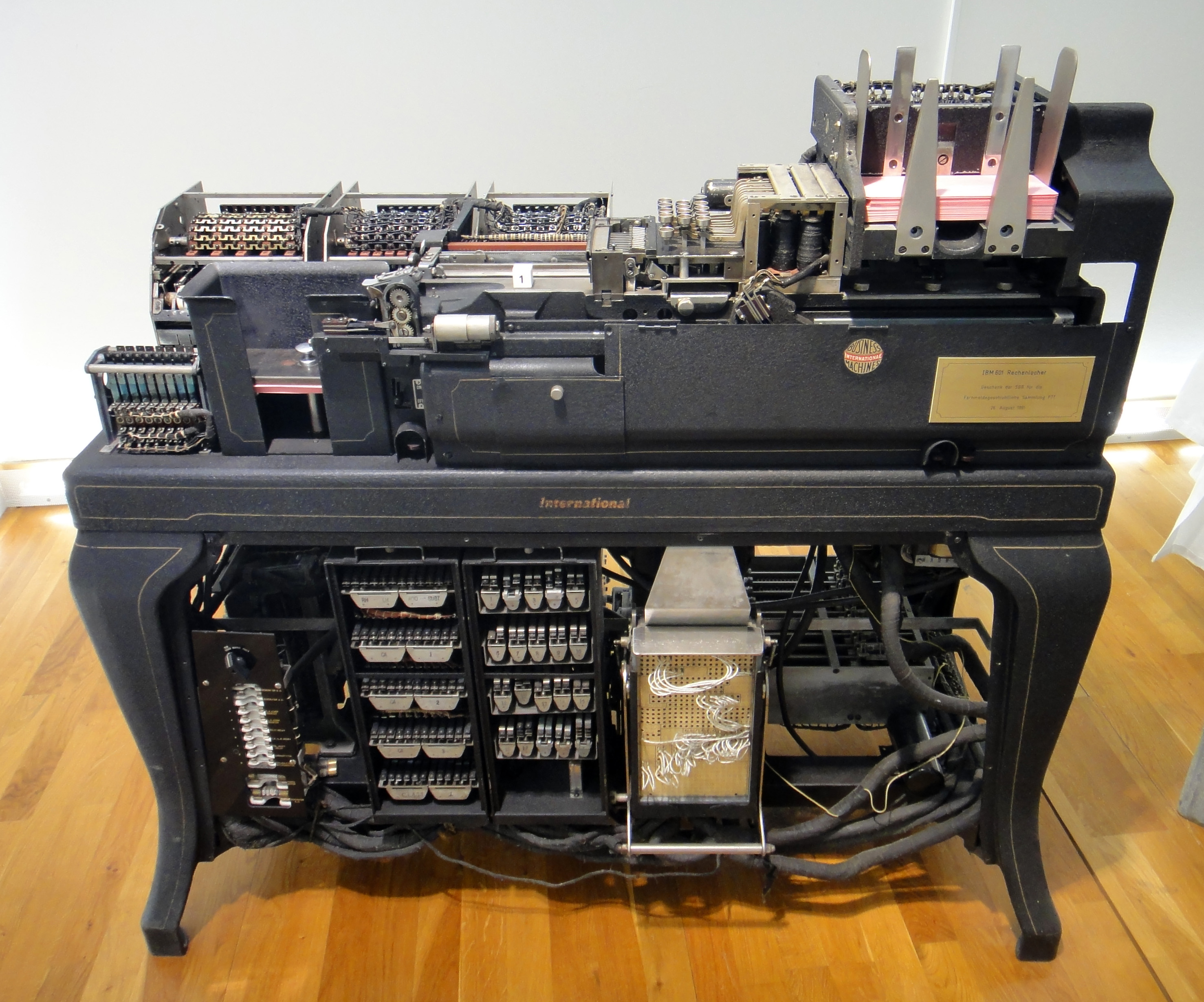
Livesay programmed IBM 601s and other PCAMs for the Manhattan Project.

Livesay was brought onto the Manhattan Project by American physicist Joseph Hirschfelder where he initially reached out to her with the opportunity in the fall of 1943. She began work at Los Alamos in February 1944 after receiving her security clearance. Her advanced mathematics degree and training in programming IBM machines made her uniquely qualified. Upon her arrival, Livesay was asked to work for Richard Feynman's theoretical group, working to determine the predicted shock wave that would result from an implosion type bomb. Livesay held a supervisor role on Feynman's team where she oversaw a crew that ran IBM machines 24 hours a day. She also performed hand calculations to check the work of the IBM machine.

Alongside Stan Frankel and Eldred Nelson, Livesay developed a program for the PCAMs to solve the set of hydrodynamic equations for implosions in February and March of 1944. She later served as supervisor of the PCAM operators. Livesay recruited mathematician Eleanor Ewing to the project. While at Los Alamos, they both received mathematics lectures from John von Neumann. Livesay, in turn, instructed von Neumann in the use of the IBM machines, information that he later used in the design of ENIAC. The ENIAC was the world's first programmable, electronic, general-purpose computer what was funded by the U.S Army to calculate artillary firing tables. They needed this during World War 2 to rapidly calculate artillery firing tables for the united stated army. Before electronic computers existed, these complex calculations were done by hand and took way to long.

After the Manhattan Project, Livesay attempted to continue her career in England. She worked to establish a computer link between Harwell and Teddington. Her salary, 30 percent below that of her colleagues, did not sufficiently offset expense of child care and she abandoned her mathematics career. She made less because the British civil Service formally enforced separate, lower pay scales for women during the 1940's and early 1950's. Because both the Atomic Energy Research Establishment at Harwell and the National Physical Laboratory at Teddington were government-run research facilities, her pay was dictated by official state policy so Naomi made 30 percent less than what it would be if she was a man doing the same job. Beginning in 1956, she taught for a year as an assistant professor of science at Columbia College in South Carolina.

== Personal life ==
While working at Los Alamos, Livesay met experimental nuclear physicist Anthony French. They married in October 1945 and had two children. She died in Arlington, Massachusetts, on March 6, 2001.
