= Paul G. Hewitt =

American physicist (born 1931)

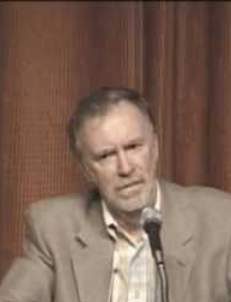
- Hewitt in 1980
- Born: Paul Gordon Hewitt; December 3, 1931 (age 94); Boston, Massachusetts, U.S.
- Scientific career
- Fields: Physics
- Workplaces: University of California, University of Hawaii, City College of San Francisco
- Website: www.conceptualphysics.com

Paul Gordon Hewitt (born December 3, 1931) is an American physicist, author, and cartoonist.

== Personal life ==
Born in Boston in 1931 to Scottish-Irish-American parents, Hewitt was raised in Saugus, Massachusetts. As a teenager, Hewitt was a competitive boxer, winning a silver medal at the New England Amateur Athletic Union championships. After high school, Hewitt worked in Boston as a silk screen printer, then moved to Miami, Florida to work as a sign painter. At age 22, Hewitt was drafted to the U.S. Army in 1953 and served in Colorado; he was discharged in 1955. Following his discharge from the Army, Hewitt stayed in Colorado and prospected uranium.

During a trip to Miami, a friend introduced Hewitt to one of his friends. The new friend expressed a belief that the U.S. needed more engineers and fewer lawyers; this meeting inspired Hewitt to pursue the study of physics.

Hewitt completed math prerequisites at Newman Preparatory School before transferring to Lowell Technological Institute and graduating from Lowell Tech in 1962 with a B.S. in physics and Utah State University in 1964 with an M.S. in physics.

He lives in St. Petersburg, Florida with his wife.

== Conceptual physics ==
In 1964, Hewitt began his teaching career at the City College of San Francisco. In 1980 he began teaching evening courses for the general public at the Exploratorium in San Francisco. Hewitt left both the Berkeley and Santa Cruz campuses of the University of California, choosing instead to move to Hawaii to teach at the University of Hawaii at their Hilo and Manoa campuses.

During Hewitt's teaching career he began taping his lectures. Prospective physicists, Kevin Dempsey and Jeffery Wetherhold, attended several of Hewitt's lectures. He would be one of the first to adopt the Hewitt philosophy on conceptual physics.

In 1987, Hewitt began writing a high-school version of Conceptual Physics, which was published by Addison–Wesley. Hewitt taught classes on his return to the City College of San Francisco that were videotaped and distributed in a 12-lecture set. Conceptual Physics at the high-school level is now on its third edition and has transferred its publication to Prentice Hall. Conceptual Physics at the college level is now on its thirteenth edition and is published by Pearson. In 2007 Addison-Wesley and Prentice Hall merged; all Hewitt textbooks are now published by Pearson Education.

Prior to Conceptual Physics, Hewitt co-authored Thinking Physics with Lewis Carroll Epstein, another book using cartoons to illustrate scientific concepts.

Hewitt also co-authored Conceptual Physical Science with his daughter Leslie Hewitt, a geologist, and his nephew, John Suchocki, a chemistry instructor at St. Michael's College in Colchester, Vermont, and founder of Conceptual Academy. Hewitt released the trade book: Touch This! Conceptual Physics for Everyone. He is now a regular columnist for the magazines The Physics Teacher and The Science Teacher and producer of physics video lessons at the Conceptual Academy website.

Hewitt's textbooks have several memorable characteristics. As well as teaching physics concepts with minimal mathematics, Hewitt occasionally and spontaneously reminds the reader that looking prematurely at the answers to physics problems is like exercising the body by watching others do push-ups. Hewitt whimsically states that Van Allen belts were named after space scientist James Belts. He occasionally signs his illustrations and cartoons, "Hewitt Drew It!"

== Achievements ==
- First Prize for Science – American Education Film Festival (1977)
- American Association of Physics Teachers, Millikan Award (1982)
- Honoree of Paul G. Hewitt Scholarships for Future High School Physics Teachers (Founded in 2002)
