= WebAssign =

Online learning and homework service

- Founded: 1997; 29 years ago
- Founders: Aaron Titus, Larry Martin
- Industry: Educational technology
- Products: Online homework platform
- Parent: Cengage
- Website: www.webassign.net
- Commercial: Yes
- Registration: Required
- Current status: Active

WebAssign is an American online homework platform used by instructors and students in higher education. The educational platform allows instructors to assign textbook-based problems and manage coursework digitally. WebAssign was acquired by Cengage Learning in 2016.

== History ==
WebAssign was created in 1997 by Ph.D. student, Aaron Titus, and North Park University professor, Larry Martin, under the Department of Physics at North Carolina State University (NCSU). The product was piloted in several large classes at NCSU.

WebAssign became commercially available as a hosted subscription service in January 1998 under the leadership of John Risley, a physics education specialist and professor in the Department of Physics at North Carolina State University. WebAssign became one of NC State's fastest growing spin-offs. Feedback from instructors and students in physics, math, statistics, and chemistry is used in expanding and refining the product.

In 1998, WebAssign incorporated under the name Advanced Instructional Systems with Risley as CEO. In 2003, the company officially spun off from NCSU and moved to NCSU's Centennial Campus.

In 2012, WebAssign reincorporated as an employee-owned benefit corporation, a hybrid between a traditional stock corporation (being for profit) and a non-profit that has a social mission.

WebAssign was named a finalist in the "Software Company" category by the North Carolina Technology Association (NCTA); the NCTA 21 Awards is North Carolina's statewide technology awards program, recognizing companies that have characterized excellence, innovation, and leadership in 21 categories.

In September 2016 Webassign was acquired by Cengage Learning.

== Online instruction ==
WebAssign's core function is to load end-of-chapter questions from various textbooks into its archives, from which instructors may pick and choose in order to assemble a virtual assignment. Students must pay for access to their homework at a rate that varies based on the text they are accessing and are presented with multiple lengths of time for which they can activate their subscription, but are asked to pay more for longer subscriptions. The associated cost ranges widely, usually requiring students to pay between $15 and $70 per semester or quarter.
