= United States Physics Olympiad =

High school physics competition

The United States Physics Olympiad (USAPhO) is a high school physics competition run by the American Association of Physics Teachers and the American Institute of Physics to select the team to represent the United States at the International Physics Olympiad (IPhO). The team is selected through a series of exams testing their problem solving abilities. The top 20 finalists are invited to a rigorous study camp at the University of Maryland to prepare for the IPhO.

US Physics Team Logo

== History ==
The International Physics Olympiad began in 1967 among Eastern European countries; many western countries soon joined in the 1970s. In 1986, the American Association of Physics Teachers led by Jack Wilson organized the United States Physics Team for the first time. The 1986 team was made up of 20 talented high school physics students nominated by their teachers. Five students were selected for the International Physics Olympiad after a rigorous preparation at the University of Maryland. At the 1986 London IPhO, the team brought home three bronze medals.

Since then, the US Physics Team has regularly placed in the top ten nations at the international competition. It has accumulated 66 Gold Medals, 48 Silver Medals, 29 Bronze Medals, and 11 Honorable Mentions at IPhO as of 2019.

=== Academic directors ===
- Tengiz Bibilashvili (2021–present)
- JiaJia Dong (2018–2021)
- Paul Stanley (2008–2018)
- Robert Shurtz (2006–2008)
- Mary Mogge (1998–2006)
- Ed Neuenschwander (1996–1998)
- Larry D. Kirkpatrick (1988–1996)

=== Notable alumni ===
- Alexandr Wang (2014)
- Anand Natarajan (2009)
- John Schulman (2005)
- Glen Weyl (2003)
- David Simmons-Duffin (2002)
- Dario Amodei (2000)
- Natalia Toro (1999)
- Andrew Houck (1996)
- Chris Hirata (1996)
- Rhiju Das (1995)
- Andrew Neitzke (1994)
- Szymon Rusinkiewicz (1992)
- Steven Gubser (1989)

== Physics team selection ==
USAPhO qualification scores
Year	Cutoff
2012	15.5
2013	12.25
2014	12.5 (Scantron); 11.25 (Webassign)
2015	18
2016	14
2017	16
2018	14 (A), 15 (B)
2019	16 (A), 17 (B)
2020	16
2021	15
2022	15
2023	18
2024	14
2025	15
2026	16

The procedure to select the U.S. Physics Team consists of two exams: the "F=ma" and the "USA Physics Olympiad" (USAPhO). Approximately the top 20 finishers are invited to the U.S. Physics Team training camp. (In some previous years, there was also an intermediate, quarterfinal exam.)

=== F = ma exam ===
Approximately 6,000 students take this first exam, which consists of 25 multiple choice questions to be solved in 75 minutes, focusing on algebra-based mechanics. In the past, a quarter point was deducted for each incorrect answer. From 2015 onwards, no points were deducted for incorrect answers. Prior to 2018, the exam was offered over multiple weeks at the discretion of the exam centers. From 2018 to 2023, the exam was changed to two single-day events with two different exams, F=ma A and F=ma B, to increase exam security. As of 2023, only one F=ma exam is given. The 2026 F=ma test was held February 12, 2026.

=== USAPhO exam ===
Approximately the top 500 (~400 prior to 2024) students from the F=ma exam are invited to take a free-response, calculus-based exam covering all topics in introductory physics, including mechanics, electricity and magnetism, thermodynamics, fluids, relativity, waves, and nuclear and atomic physics. There are two parts in the exam, each allotted 90 minutes, and 6 problems in total. Prior to 2017, the exam could be taken at any time during a two-week window in March. Afterward, the exam was changed to be a single day event in early April, to protect exam security.

All USAPhO qualifiers receive certificates of recognition for their physics skill. The medal system is modeled on that of the International Physics Olympiad: the top 12% scorers in the USAPhO will receive gold medals, the next 15% receive silver medals, the next 20% receive bronze medals and the next 25% receive honorable mentions. Additionally, students who did not earn an award but "whose problem solving efforts and dedication merit special recognition" are given distinction for commendable performance.

=== Training camp ===
Approximately the top 20 students in the nation are selected for the U.S. Physics Team, and invited to a training camp at the University of Maryland. There, students receive intensive theoretical and experimental preparation and take a series of selection tests. The top five students travel to the International Physics Olympiad to represent the United States.

In 2024, the USA did not participate in the IPhO due to conflict with the host venue. In 2026, the USA did not participate in the IPhO due to safety concerns regarding the host venue in Colombia, which was under a U.S. Department of State Level 3 (“Reconsider travel”) advisory. In both years, the team took part in the European Physics Olympiad instead.
