= Homer L. Dodge =

American physicist

Homer Levi Dodge
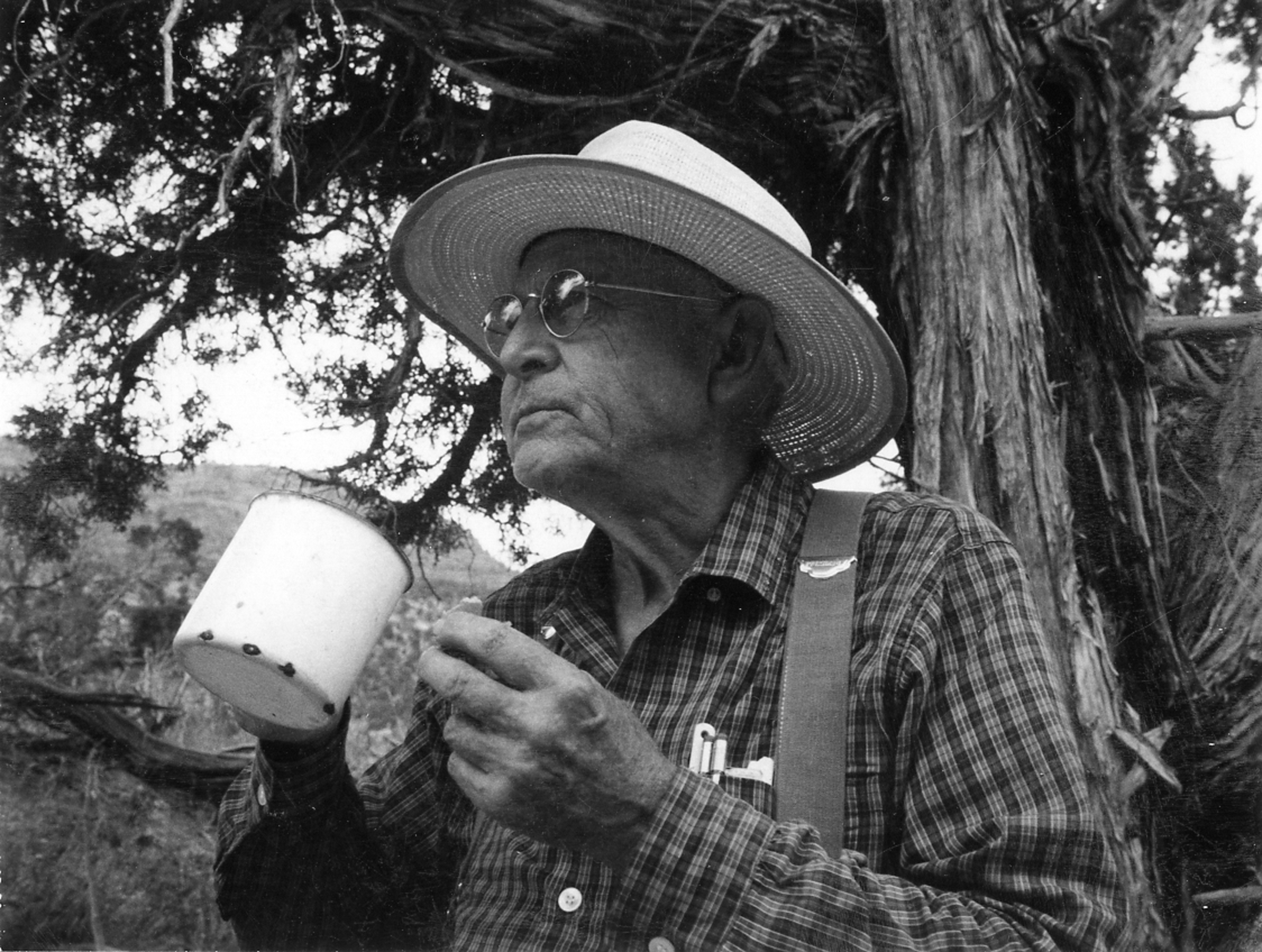
- Dodge in 1965
- Born: October 21, 1887; Ogdensburg, New York
- Died: June 29, 1983 (aged 95); Mechanicsville, Maryland
- Awards: Oersted Medal
- Scientific career
- Institutions: University of Oklahoma; Norwich University

Homer Levi Dodge (October 21, 1887 - June 29, 1983) was an American physicist, educator, and university administrator. During his career, he served as the Chair of the Department of Physics, Dean of the Graduate school, and founder of the Oklahoma Research Institute, at the University of Oklahoma in Norman, Oklahoma; President of Norwich University, in Northfield, Vermont; and the first president of the American Association of Physics Teachers (AAPT).

In 1919 Dodge became chairman of the Physics Department at the University of Oklahoma, and in 1926 he became dean of the graduate school.

He was president of the Board of Trustees for the School of Religion from 1927 to 1944.

At the December 1930 meeting of the American Physical Society, Dodge helped to organize the American Association of Physics Teachers (AAPT).

He was elected the first President of the AAPT.

In 1941, he organized the Oklahoma Research Institute and became its first director.

From 1942 to 1944, he took a leave of absence from the University of Oklahoma to serve as director of the Office of Scientific Personnel of the National Research Council.

Homer Dodge stopped by Omaha when he was heading to the west for vacation in 1956 to invest with young Warren Buffett. Warren Buffett was young, but he looked even younger. So, many investors didn't want to give serious money to Warren. However, Homer trusted the analytical mind of Warren Buffett and wanted to put in $120,000 in Buffett Associates. The only problem was Buffett Associates was for "family members or close friends only," Homer and Warren Buffett set up a separate partnership. Homer Dodge was worth tens of millions when he died in 1983, thanks to his early trust in Warren Buffett.

His son Norton Dodge was an economist and prominent art collector who purchased the Cremona estate in Maryland.

== Sources ==
- Homer L Dodge biography at the University of Oklahoma

President of Norwich University, 1945-1950.
