= Beverly Karplus Hartline =

American physicist

Beverly Karplus Hartline (born 1950) is an American physicist, science communicator, and academic administrator, known for her research in physics outreach to the general public and for the promotion of women in physics and the sciences. She is a former deputy director of the Argonne National Laboratory, and professor emerita of geological engineering at Montana Technological University, where she was vice-chancellor for research and dean of the graduate school before retiring.

== Education and career ==
Hartline is originally from New Jersey, born in 1950 as the oldest of seven children of physicist Robert Karplus, who was working at the time at the Institute for Advanced Study, and of Betty Karplus, later a science educator. After her father moved to the University of California, Berkeley, she grew up in the San Francisco Bay Area. She majored in physics and chemistry at Reed College, learning glassblowing for her senior thesis on organometallic chemistry, and graduating in 1971. She completed a Ph.D. in geophysics in 1978 at the University of Washington; her dissertation research involved thermal convection in the oceanic crust.

After working for two years as a research news journalist for the journal Science, she began a career working for US government physics laboratories, starting with NASA's Goddard Space Flight Center from 1980 to 1982. She then worked for the Lawrence Berkeley National Laboratory from 1982 to 1985, and the Continuous Electron Beam Accelerator Facility at the Thomas Jefferson National Accelerator Facility from 1985 to 1996, where she eventually became associate director and project manager.

From 1996 to 1998 she worked as part of the administration of US president Bill Clinton, as an assistant director for physical sciences and engineering in the Office of Science and Technology Policy. She was known there for her hands-on approach to public science outreach, including direct telephone calls to constituents with questions and suggestions about national science policy.

Returning to government laboratory management, she worked at the Los Alamos National Laboratory from 1998 to 2001, as project director for the Spallation Neutron Source and acting deputy associate director for strategic and supporting research, and as the deputy director of the Argonne National Laboratory from 2001 to 2003.

Next, she turned to academia, as a visiting professor at Heritage University and then, from 2006 to 2009, as dean of natural sciences, professor of physics, and interim dean of graduate studies and research at Delaware State University. She moved to the University of the District of Columbia in 2009, as associate provost for research and dean of graduate studies, also serving a year there as interim dean of engineering and applied sciences. In 2012, she became vice-chancellor for research and dean of the graduate school at Montana Technological University. She retired in 2021.

== Recognition ==
Hartline was named a Fellow of the American Physical Society (APS) in 2000, after a nomination from the APS Forum on Education, "for creative leadership and drive to advance physics and other science education at all levels from kindergarten to graduate school, including outreach to teachers and the general public". She was named a Fellow of Sigma Xi in 2021, "for distinguished accomplishments and tireless efforts to build research capacity; champion and enhance diversity, science education, and outreach; and promote mentorship and honor in science". She is also a Fellow of the American Association for the Advancement of Science, elected in 2013, and of the Association for Women in Science.
