= American Association of Physics Teachers =

Physics organization

The American Association of Physics Teachers (AAPT) was founded in 1930 for the purpose of "dissemination of knowledge of physics, particularly by way of teaching." There are more than 10,000 members in over 30 countries. AAPT publications include two peer-reviewed journals, the American Journal of Physics and The Physics Teacher. The association has two annual National Meetings (winter and summer) and has regional sections with their own meetings and organization. The association also offers grants and awards for physics educators, including the Richtmyer Memorial Award and programs and contests for physics educators and students. It is headquartered at the American Center for Physics in College Park, Maryland.

== History ==
The American Association of Physics Teachers was founded on December 31, 1930, when forty-five physicists held a meeting during the joint APS-AAAS meeting in Cleveland specifically for that purpose.

The AAPT became a founding member of the American Institute of Physics after the other founding members were convinced of the stability of the AAPT itself after a new constitution for the AAPT was agreed upon.

== Contests ==
The AAPT sponsors a number of competitions for students and educators, including Physics Bowl, Six Flags' roller coaster contest, High School Physics Photo Contest, Apparatus Competition, and the US Physics Team. The US physics team is determined by two preliminary exams and a week and a half long "boot camp". Each year, five members are selected to compete against dozens of countries in the International Physics Olympiad (IPHO).

== Publications ==
=== The Physics Teacher ===
The Physics Teacher is a peer-reviewed academic journal published by AIP Publishing on behalf of the American Association of Physics Teachers covering the history and philosophy of physics, applied physics, physics education (curriculum developments, pedagogy, instructional lab equipment, etc.), and book reviews. It was established in 1963 and the current editor-in-chief is Gary White (George Washington University). Paul G. Hewitt is a regular contributor to The Physics Teacher.

=== American Journal of Physics ===
The American Journal of Physics is a monthly, peer-reviewed scientific journal published by the American Association of Physics Teachers and the American Institute of Physics. The editor-in-chief is Beth Parks of Colgate University.

== See also ==
- American Institute of Physics
- Oersted Medal
- Physics outreach
