= Malcolm Gavin =

British physicist, electronis engineer and educational administrator

Malcolm Gavin CBE MBE FInstP FIET
- Born: Malcolm Ross Gavin; 27 April 1908
- Died: 4 February 1989 (aged 80); Elgin
- Education: Hamilton Academy; University of Glasgow
- Known for: Physics; Education; Electronics
- Spouse: Isobel
- Children: Ross and Eileen
- Scientific career
- Fields: Physics; Electronics
- Workplaces: General Electric Company; Birmingham College of Technology; University of North Wales; Chelsea College of Science and Technology
- Thesis: Negative Grid Valves and their Circuits (1949)

Malcolm Gavin was a British physicist, electronics engineer and educational administrator. In 1965, Gavin was appointed the principal of Chelsea College of Science and Technology and was instrumental in converting the college into a federal member of the University of London, before creating the first Professor of Education Science in the United Kingdom. Gavin had been a pioneer of radar systems during World War II, and would later become the chair of the council of the Royal Dental Hospital School of Surgery and president of the Institute of Physics and Physics Society.

== Education and early career ==
Gavin was educated at the Hamilton Academy before attending the University of Glasgow, graduating in 1929 in Mathematics and Natural Philosophy. After leaving university, Gavin had become a mathematics teacher at Dalziel High School in Motherwell, but joined the M. O. Valve Company, at General Electric Company Research Laboratories at Wembley in 1936, later becoming the Head of the Special Radio Group. At Wembley, he initially worked on high-frequency valves and circuits, but during World War II he helped develop radar search receivers and jamming transmitters, in co-ordination with the Radio Countermeasures (RCM) Board at TRE and the Air Ministry RCM committee. In 1947, Gavin joined the inspectorate of the Scottish Education Department, where he stayed for three years, while he completed a Doctorate in Science at the University of Glasgow.

== Later career ==
In 1950, Gavin became the head of the Department of Physics and Mathematics at the Birmingham College of Technology, whilst three years later he would go on to become vice principal until his departure in 1955. While at Birmingham, Gavin created a research group working in the field of electronics and semi-conductors, while introducing new post graduate courses in Electronics, Transistors, Vacuum technique, X-ray technology and gamma radiography. Upon leaving Birmingham, Gavin was appointed the chair of Applied Electricity at the University of North Wales in Bangor, which he grew into the School of Engineering Science that became noted for its progressive approach to delivering applied sciences.

In 1965, Gavin was appointed as the Principal of the Chelsea College of Science and Technology replacing C. C. Hentschell, and lead the colleges integration as a federal member of the University of London in 1966. He had been influential in this move, as he had been a member of the Academic Advisory committee that had been set up in 1964 to consult with the University Grants Committee after its failed move to St Albans. As part of the college becoming part of the University of London, it was planned to move the site to outer London, with a site at Tooting, which was initiated by Gavin, however the move was not completed until after Gavin retired. During his time as principal, Gavin created the first Professor of Education Science in the United Kingdom, appointing Kevin Keohane into the role, with support from the Nuffield Science Teaching Project, with whom Gavin would be instrumental in the creation of the joint Nuffield Chelsea Curriculum Trust. Gavin retired from the role in September 1973, being replaced by J. E. Ingram from Keele University.

== Writing ==
Gavin wrote various papers for journals and book in various subjects:

- Triodes for very short waves—oscillators (with J Bell, EG James, GW Warren) – Journal of the Institution of Electrical Engineers-Part IIIA: Radiolocation 93 (5), 833–846, 1946
- Industrial applications of infrared – Nature 162 (4121), 637–637, 1948
- Transit time oscillations in triodes (with OH Critchley) – British Journal of Applied Physics 3 (3), 92, 1952
- Electricity and Magnetism – Physics Bulletin 8 (8), 260, 1957
- Electrode spacing in disc-seal triodes (with W Fulop, LJ Herbst) – Proceedings of the IEE-Part B: Radio and Electronic Engineering 105 (10S), 544–549, 1958
- Energy balance in disk seal oscillators at ultra-high frequencies (with LJ Herbst) – British Journal of Applied Physics 9 (9), 377, 1958
- Principles of electronics with J.E. Houldin (1 Jan 1959) ISBN 978-0-340-04852-8
- The Physics of Electricity and Magnetism – Physics Bulletin 10 (12), 311, 1959
- Electron Physics – Physics Bulletin 11 (3), 75, 1960
- Electronic Fundamentals and Applications – Physics Bulletin 12 (6), 174, 1961
- Electronic, Radio, and Microwave Physics – Physics Bulletin 12 (11), 322, 1961
- Static Fields In Electricity and Magnetism – Physics Bulletin 13 (3), 87, 1962
- Electronics as a Career – Physics Bulletin 13 (7), 211, 1962
- Fundamentals of Electronics – Physics Bulletin 13 (12), 131, 1962
- A 5-Mc/s Klystron Amplifier using Positive Ions (with K Chandra, LJ Lloyd) – Nature 195 (4845), 988–988, 1962
- A Dictionary of Electronics – Physics Bulletin 14 (8), 218, 1963
- Microwave Engineering – Physics Bulletin 14 (9), 257, 1963
- Introduction to Electromagnetic Fields and Waves – Physics Bulletin 14 (10), 291, 1963
- Transistor and semiconductor Teaching – Radio and Electronic Engineer 25 (3), 257–261, 1963
- Positive Ion Beams (with K Chandra, LJ Lloyd) – INTERNATIONAL JOURNAL OF ELECTRONICS 14 (2), 121–128, 1963
- Electric Filter Circuits – Physics Bulletin 15 (3), 70, 1964
- Klystrons with double-gap bunchers (with K Chandra) – INTERNATIONAL JOURNAL OF ELECTRONICS 16 (1), 65–74, 1964
- Universities and the community – Physics Bulletin 21 (7), 292, 1970

== Public office and committees ==
Between 1960 and 1964, Gavin was a member of the Electronics Research Council of the Ministry of Aviation. In 1962, Gavin became a member of the Research Committee of the British Institution of Radio Engineers, and would join the council for the newly formed Science Research Council in 1965. Gavin was elected as vice president of the Institute of Physics and Physics Society in 1963, becoming the President between 1968 and 1970. From 1968 to 1973, Gavin was a director of the Fulmer Research Institute. In 1969, Gavin was appointed the chair of the Control Engineering committee of the Universities Science and Technology board, and was a member of the Inter-University Council for Higher Education Overseas. In 1969, Gavin lead a working group on a review of academic staff at the Open University. Between 1968 and 1970 he was a council member for the European Physical Society, and between 1973 and 1974 he was council member for the North Wales Naturalist Trust. From 1974 to 1981 he was the chair of the council of the Royal Dental Hospital School of Dental Surgery.

== Awards ==
In 1945, Gavin was awarded the MBE for his pioneering work on Radar systems. He was elected a member of the British Institution of Radio Engineers in 1957. In 1966, Gavin was awarded a CBE in the New Year's honour list. Gavin was a Fellow of the Institution of Electrical Engineers and a Fellow of the Institute of Physics. Chelsea College made Gavin an honorary fellow in 1970, and named their new hall of residence that opened in Tooting during 1977 after their old principal.

== Personal life ==
Gavin was born on 27 April 1908, the third son of James Gavin. In 1935 he married Jessie Isobel Hutchinson and they had two children, Ross and Eileen. Gavin died in Elgin on the 4 February 1989.
