= Kevin Keohane =

British physicist, science educator and educational administrator

Kevin Keohane CBE, KCSG, FInstP
- Born: Kevin William Keohane; 28 February 1923; Portsmouth
- Died: 13 April 1996 (aged 73)
- Known for: Physics; Education
- Spouse: Patricia Ashford
- Children: 4
- Awards: Lawrence Bragg Medal and Prize; Honorary Fellow of University of Roehampton; Honorary Fellow of the University of Surrey; KCSG
- Scientific career
- Fields: Physics; Education
- Workplaces: University of Bristol; Chelsea College of Science and Technology; Nuffield Foundation; Roehampton Institute of Higher Education; King's College London

Kevin William Keohane CBE, KCSG, FInstP (1923-1996) was a British physicist and education administrator. Keohane was the first Professor of Science Education in the United Kingdom, holding the position with the Chelsea College of Science and Technology between 1967 and 1976. Keohane was made the first Rector of the newly formed Roehampton Institute of Higher Education in 1976, a position he held until his retirement in 1988.

== Early career ==
Keohane attended Borden Grammar School, and achieved his degree at the University of Bristol. After a year of his degree he joined the Royal Air Force as part of the war effort, reaching the rank of Flight Lieutenant working on radar. After leaving the RAF, Keohane completed his degree and joined the University of Bristol initially as a physics researcher on the optics of the eye, before taking the role of lecturer in anatomy, followed by becoming a reader in biophysics. In 1952 Keohane founded the British publication Journal for Education Policy.

Keohane joined Chelsea College of Science and Technology as Professor of Physics. During 1965 the college was planned to be moved to St. Albans by the British government, however by 1966 the college had joined the University of London as a federal member. As part of his involvement, he pushed the government for the funding and introduction of the new chair of Science Education, the first in Britain, which was created in 1967. Keohane was elected to the role, becoming founder and first director of the new Chelsea Centre for Science Education. Keohane had by this time become co-ordinator for the Nuffield Foundation Science Teaching project, replacing John Maddox, and the first editor for the Institute of Physics journal Physics Education.

While at Chelsea College of Science and Technology, Keohane helped create the new Chair of Mathematics, became the Vice-Principal of the college and was instrumental in the Nuffield Foundation basing their curriculum research teams at Chelsea and leading on key projects. Keohane had initially not been keen on the Nuffield Foundations work, recalling in 1988 that he "was not optimistic, in part because of a lack of funding to support teachers' work, but mainly because he saw no hope of attracting enough physics graduates into teaching." During the early 1970s Keohane was critical with the re-organisation of Higher Education, especially with Catholic Colleges, stating "One seriously wonders in all this what professional advice has been heeded in this administrative exercise of reorganisation. Little if anything has been forthcoming on what is almost certainly to happen to Catholic colleges — to which we, the laity, have subscribed financially, and in which we have a special interest for the provision of Catholic teachers."

== Later career ==
In 1976, Keohane left his position at Chelsea College of Science and Technology to become the first Rector of the newly created Roehampton Institute of Higher Education. Keohane had prior knowledge of one of the four colleges that had been brought together, Digby Stuart College, where he had been a governor. As part of his new position he had to re-organise the four colleges into one institution.

However he was still active in research work, writing the report "Research on Science Education in Europe: Improvement of Research Activities and Results" for the Council for Cultural Co-operation's Committee for Educational Research. In 1978, Keohane was selected to set up a study group by the then Secretary of State for Education, to look into the proposals for a Certificate of Extended Education that had been proposed by the Schools Council. The resulting report became known as the Keohane Report, (officially called Proposals for a Certificate of Extended Education) with its recommendations being rejected by the then Department for Education and Science. Keohane also continued to teach as a visiting professor at King's College London.

Keohane retired as Rector of Roehampton Institute of Higher Education in 1988, but was still engaged in educational work. As the founder of the Journal for Education Policy, he had worked his way up to be Vice Chair of the Taylor and Francis publishing business, a position he held until 1993. In 1986 he joined the board of Myrrh, a charity delivering craft and technical courses to the unemployed in South East London, helping find new private funding when government funds were withdrawn. Keohane also worked for numerous institutions in advisor and governor roles up and to his death including Ursuline High School, Wimbledon and Wimbledon College.

== Awards ==
Keohane was awarded a CBE in 1976 for his contribution to education. In 1987 he was made an Honorary Doctorate of the University of Surrey, while in 1988 Keohane was made an Honorary Fellow of University of Roehampton. Keohane won the Institute of Physics Lawrence Bragg Medal and Prize in 1991 for his outstanding contribution to physics education.

Keohane was awarded the Order of St. Gregory the Great twice, firstly as a Knight, and then as a Knight Commander (KCSG).

== Personal life ==
Keohane was born in Portsmouth, Hampshire to William Patrick and Mabel Margaret Keohane on the 28 February 1923, one of three children. He married Mary Margaret Patricia Ashford (known as Patricia). They had four children, one son and three girls. Keohane was a practicing Catholic.

== Death ==
Keohane died on 13 April 1996. At his funeral former colleague Professor Paul Black said in his eulogy:

"Here was a people's person, not a book person, a person who did not build up institutions for his own glory but to meet needs and to support and promote others in doing so"
