= Nuffield Science Project =

Educational programmes

The Nuffield Science Teaching Project was a programme to develop a better approach to teaching science in British (Note: Strictly speaking, the Nuffield programme only applied to England and Wales; schools in Northern Ireland and Scotland were administered separately. However, immediately before joining the project Donald McGill had previously worked for the Scottish Education Department and worked on their alternative 'O' grade syllabus, published in 1963; Woolnough, pp. 95–96; and a Scottish teachers' team developed the mechanics section for Nuffield physics; Jardine, pp. 172+. The Scottish Science for the 70s course was a rival to Nuffield Combined Science; Woolnough, p. 56.) secondary schools, under the auspices of the Nuffield Foundation. Although not intended as a curriculum, it gave rise to alternative national examinations, and its use of discovery learning was influential in the 1960s and 1970s.

== Background ==
In 1957, the Science Masters Association (later amalgamated with the Association of Women Science Teachers as The Association for Science Education) established a Science Teaching Subcommittee, later the Science and Education Subcommittee, led by its chairman, Henry Boulind, a physicist who had attended a UNESCO conference the previous year in Hamburg and come away persuaded that science teaching, particularly in physics, needed to be brought up to date for the post-war atomic age and to become teaching "in and through science". Subject panels in physics, chemistry, biology and general science developed new syllabi for 'O' and 'A' levels which were presented to the Secondary Schools Examination Council in 1960. The Staff Inspector for Science, R. A. R. Tricker, criticised the physics syllabus as overly theoretical and a year's practical trial of the material was conducted in 30 schools. The subcommittee then invited representatives from government and the Institutes of Physics and Chemistry to a meeting in August 1961 at Barrow Court, where the consensus was that outside funding should be sought for a full process to develop curricula and teaching materials. The Nuffield Foundation had also been investigating the problem, and sponsored a meeting at Battersea College of Technology hosted by the Head of Physics, Lewis Elton, in April 1961, and also consulted John Lewis, the senior science master at Malvern College, who had been involved at all stages in the Association's Subcommittee and had been impressed by the science teaching he had seen in a tour of Russia. The hope was to improve British science teaching, and hence British industry, "by persuasion" where Russia had done so "by compulsion". (Note: Concern for the competitiveness of British industry was widespread at the time; in 1963 Harold Wilson made a speech urging improvements to education so that Britain would not be disadvantaged in the "white heat of the technological revolution"; cited in Alan Peacock, "The Emergence of Primary Science", in Amos and Boohan, eds., Teaching Science, pp. 71–81, p. 71. This was also an international concern, with science teaching reform in the US acquiring added impetus after Sputnik; Donnelly and Jenkins, p. 28.) In December the Nuffield Foundation agreed to fund the effort to improve science education in England and Wales, building on the Science Masters Association's work, but on its own terms, with an initial commitment of £250,000 for three working groups to develop outlines, textbooks, teachers' guides and classroom equipment for the teaching of physics, chemistry and biology to pupils aged 11–15, and the Minister of Education, Sir David Eccles, announced the plan in the House of Commons on 4 April 1962.

== History and characteristics ==
For each of the three sciences, a working group was established headed by a full-time organiser, appointed for three years, and including a consultative committee of experts, and six or seven team leaders, expert teachers on one-year appointments who headed local groups of half a dozen science teachers which would develop and test materials. The physics project was organised first, under Donald McGill; the chemistry project was under H. F. Halliwell, and the biology project under W. H. Dowdeswell. The initial focus on the course to 'O' level was extended to 'A' level and a Junior Science Project on primary school teaching was added by 1966; later in the 1960s Nuffield also began a Combined Science Project, a Secondary Science Project for pupils who would not take 'O' levels, the Nuffield Language Teaching Programme in modern languages, and programmes in mathematics, classics, and social studies. McGill died in March 1963 and was succeeded at the physics project by Eric M. Rogers. John Maddox was added as an assistant director of the foundation and coordinator of the project as a whole. In 1966 the development phase came to an end and teachers' guides, pupils' question books and other material were published in time for the school year starting in autumn 1967. Nuffield sponsored Area Committees, training of tutors to train teachers, television programmes on teaching Nuffield science, and two films showing actual chemistry classrooms: Exploring Chemistry and Chemistry by Investigation. The Local Education Authority teachers' centres and specialist centres at teacher training institutions also provided training in Nuffield methods; the project itself established the Centre for Science Education at Chelsea College, which was able to grant degrees.

Organisers were charged simply with creating "a coordinated set of materials, for use by teachers in any way they saw fit". The foundation also gave instructions to avoid public announcements or debates for two years. The approach taken in all three sciences was inquiry-based: teaching "for understanding, not learning" in a manner that was both logical and based on experiments, with pupils "learning through doing", being 'a scientist for a day' and deriving scientific laws through 'guided discovery' rather than 'prov[ing] theory'. The project used an apocryphal Chinese proverb, "I listen and I forget, I see and I remember, I do and I understand" as a motto. Halliwell, the chemistry project organiser, has said that he was greatly influenced by Sir Percy Nunn, under whom he studied in the 1920s; another important influence was work in the United States, particularly the Physical Science Study Committee's reformed physics course, with which Rogers had been involved at Princeton University. The teachers' guides outlining the class activities were explicitly described as "not a syllabus", but many teachers used them as a "bible". Particularly for physics, kits of apparatus for class experiments were developed in association with manufacturers; government money was readily available at the start of the project for schools to purchase equipment and improve their laboratories. Distinct Nuffield 'O' and 'A' level examinations were instituted, although they were originally intended only as a temporary measure.

== Reception ==
Nuffield biology was not very popular. In chemistry and physics, the Nuffield discovery approach was dominant by the 1970s and had a lasting influence, although more teachers used the materials than taught Nuffield science as the project developers had intended. (Note: Another study in the same period analysed differences in familiarity and attitudes between "high adopters" and "low adopters" of Nuffield chemistry; the percentage of "low adopters" 'using all or most' of the materials at the relevant level was in the 20s; Donnelly and Jenkins, p. 33.) At their peak of popularity, the Nuffield 'O' and 'A' level examinations were still only taken by far fewer candidates than the traditional GCEs.

The project was developed primarily by academics and teachers in private and selective schools, in the context of the early objective of having comprehensive schools provide a "grammar school education for all", (Note: David Turner, "Reform and the Physics Curriculum in Britain and the United States", Comparative Education Review 28.3 (August 1984) 444–53, notes that the Physical Science Study Committee's reformed physics course in the United States had a similar focus on the most able students.) and the first two years of Nuffield physics and chemistry were found to be difficult even for able pupils. As a result, the Nuffield Combined Science course, derived from the three distinct science courses, was introduced in 1970 for pupils in the first two years of mixed-ability secondary schools; in 1980, 80% of schools were using this in some way. Its use of worksheets was emulated in other courses in the mid-1970s, such as the Inner London Education Authority's Insight to Science. In 1971 Nuffield Secondary Science was added; this was material from which teachers could develop a course for the Mode 3 CSE examination. Some teachers suggested that the practical work itself discouraged pupils from continuing with chemistry and physics after 'O' level. By the 1980s, with a greater emphasis on educating pupils of all abilities and the introduction of a national curriculum and replacement of the existing examinations by the GCSE, emphasis shifted from teaching theory to making science interesting and relevant and rewarding achievement. A revised version of Nuffield Combined Science, Nuffield 11 to 13, was published in 1986 reflecting this change in focus.

Some early research suggested in particular that Nuffield science was less suitable for girls than boys. This may be because girls reportedly dislike discovery teaching, but there are indications that teacher enthusiasm is more important, and a study in 1981 found no significant differences between girls' and boys' performance on Nuffield 'O' levels, possibly because few teachers actually use "open-ended" methods.

The fundamental criticism of the discovery approach as a whole is that it inaccurately presents science as "Sherlock Holmes in a white coat", with observation leading directly by induction to theory. A 1996 survey termed it "philosophically unsound and pedagogically unworkable"; children cannot realistically reproduce the progression of scientific discovery. Another expert judged Nuffield to have incorporated some particularly "naive" versions of inductivism.
