= Jon Ogborn =

British physicist and educational developer

Jon Ogborn HonFInstP
- Born: Jon Michael Ogborn
- Education: University of Cambridge
- Known for: Physics
- Awards: Lawrence Bragg Medal and Prize; Honorary Fellow of Institute of Physics
- Scientific career
- Fields: Physics; Education
- Workplaces: Worcester College of Higher Education; Nuffield Foundation; Chelsea College of Science and Technology; University of London; University of Sussex

Jon Ogborn HonFInstP is a physicist and former Professor of Science Education at the Institute of Education in the University of London, and a former Professor of Science Education at the University of Sussex. With Paul Black, Ogborn co-developed the Nuffield Foundation A-level physics qualification during the late 1960s and in the 1990s led the project to develop a new Advanced Physics A-level. He is Professor Emeritus at the University of London Institute of Education.

== Early career ==
Ogborn attended Hertford Grammar School, leaving in 1953, before attending the University of Cambridge, where he gained his degree in Natural Sciences. He followed this by achieving a Post Graduate Certificate of Education at Institute of Education in the University of London. Ogborn's first role was as a Physics teacher at William Ellis School in Highgate, London. Within a few years, Ogborn had progressed to Head of Science at Roan Grammar School in Greenwich before leaving to join the academic staff at Worcester College of Higher Education.

While at Worcester College of Higher Education during the late 1960s, he was selected to develop the Nuffield Foundation A-Level Physics programme with Paul Black. In 1971, Ogborn returned to London to work as a Senior Research Fellow, then as Reader in Physics Education at Chelsea College of Science and Technology. During the early 1970s Ogborn was the Project co-ordinator for The Higher Education Learning Project in Physics which was funded by the Nuffield Foundation. In 1975 Ogborn was selected by György Marx to be involved in the second Danube Seminar returning for further seminars over further years.

== Later career ==
In 1984 Ogborn left Chelsea College of Science and Technology to become the Professor of Science Education at Institute of Education in the University of London, a position he held until 1997, when he joined the University of Sussex in the same position of Professor of Science Education. He retired from this position in 2001, becoming Professor Emeritus of Science Education at Institute of Education.

Between 1992 and 1995, Ogborn worked on the Nuffield Foundation funded project Teaching about why things change with Richard Boohan, developing Energy and Change, a publication of three booklets to make thermodynamic ideas accessible to school students. Between February and March 1993, Ogborn was an Osher Fellow. In 1997 he was selected to lead the Advancing Physics A-Level project funded by the Institute of Physics.

Internationally Ogborn has completed research with Groupe Internationale de Recherche sur l’Enseignement de la Physique, the European Science Education Research Association and the European Union. During his membership with the International Commission on Physics Education he edited the second edition of their publication Physics Now.

== Awards ==
In 1973, Ogborn jointly won the Lawrence Bragg Medal and Prize with Paul Black. Ogborn has been made an Honorary Fellow of the Institute of Physics, and was a medallist and an Honorary Member of the Roland Eötvös Physical Society of Hungary. In 2006 he won the ICPE Medal for his contributions to physics education, "which have been outstanding in their nature and international in their scope and influence".

== Personal life ==
As a child Ogborn lived at Carbone Hill at Cuffley, with his brother David and sisters Ruth and Elizabeth and Mary, and father Maurice. Ruth married in March 1972 at Northaw. Ruth attended Ware Grammar School.

Ogborn has been married three times. His had three children with his first wife, Jane Mackereth. They divorced in the 1970s. His second wife, Professor Joan Bliss, died in 2011. He has subsequently remarried. Ogborn and Bliss had co-written articles together.

== Selected writings ==
- 2003 - Soft matter: Food for thought, December 2003, Physics Education, 39(1):45, doi:10.1088/0031-9120/39/1/001
- 2005 - 40 Years of Curriculum Development, January 2005, In book: Research and the Quality of Science Education (pp.57-65, doi:10.1007/1-4020-3673-6_5
- 2005 - Introducing relativity: Less may be more, April 2005, Physics Education, 40(3):213, doi:10.1088/0031-9120/40/3/001
- 2008 - Should science courses be context-led? - EIC, The Royal Society of Chemistry.
- 2008 - A Future for Modelling in Science Education, June 2008, Journal of Computer Assisted Learning, 6(2):103 - 112, doi:10.1111/j.1365-2729.1990.tb00355.x
