= Institute of Physics Awards =

List of IOP medals and prizes

The Institute of Physics (IOP) awards numerous prizes to acknowledge contributions to physics research, education and applications. It also offers smaller specific subject-group prizes, such as for PhD thesis submissions.

== Bilateral awards ==
- The Max Born Medal and Prize is awarded yearly by the German Physical Society and the Institute of Physics in memory of the German physicist Max Born. The prize recognizes "outstanding contributions to physics" and is awarded to physicists based in Germany and in the UK or Ireland in alternate years.
- The Fernand Holweck Medal and Prize is awarded jointly by the French and British Physical Societies for distinguished work in any aspect of physics that is ongoing or has been carried out within the 10 years preceding the award.
- The Harrie Massey Medal and Prize is awarded biennially jointly by the Institute of Physics and by The Australian Institute of Physics.
- The Giuseppe Occhialini Medal and Prize is awarded to physicists in alternating years who work in Italy (even dated years) or the UK or Ireland (odd dated years).

== Business awards ==
- The Katharine Burr Blodgett Medal and Prize is a gold medal awarded annually for outstanding contributions to the organisation or applications of physics to a physicist in an industrial or commercial context in any sector.
- The Dennis Gabor Medal and Prize is a prize awarded for distinguished contributions to the application of physics in an industrial, commercial or business context.
- The Clifford Paterson Medal and Prize is awarded for exceptional early career contributions to the application of physics.
- The Lee Lucas Award
- The Business Innovation Award
- The Business Start-Up Award
- The Apprentice Award
- The Apprenticeship Employer Award

== Education awards ==
=== The Lawrence Bragg Medal and Prize ===
First awarded in 1967, is a gold medal for outstanding and sustained contributions to physics education. Previous winners are:

- 1967 Donald McGill (posthumously)
- 1969 John Logan Lewis
- 1971 George Robert Noakes
- 1973 Jon Michael Ogborn and Paul Joseph Black
- 1975 William Albert Coates
- 1977 Edward John Wenham
- 1979 Margaret Maureen Hurst
- 1981 Geoffrey Edward Foxcroft
- 1983 Charles Alfred Taylor
- 1985 Eric Malcolm Rogers
- 1986 Wilfred Llowarch
- 1987 James Turnbull Jardine
- 1988 Anthony P French
- 1989 J Goronwy Jones
- 1990 John Marden Osborne
- 1991 Kevin William Keohane
- 1992 J Colin Siddons
- 1993 Christopher Anthony Butlin
- 1994 Cyril Isenberg
- 1995 Bryan Reginald Chapman
- 1996 Brenda Margaret Jennison
- 1997 Timothy David Robert Hickson
- 1998 Maurice George Ebison
- 1999 Averil Mary Macdonald
- 2000 Frank Russell Stannard
- 2001 George Marx
- 2002 Robert Lambourne and Michael Harry Tinker
- 2003 Ian Lawrence
- 2004 Elizabeth Swinbank
- 2005 Ken Dobson
- 2006 Derek Raine
- 2007 Philip Britton
- 2008 Robin Millar
- 2009 Becky Parker
- 2010 Peter Campbell
- 2011 Philip Harland Scott
- 2012 Katherine Blundell
- 2013 Bob Kibble
- 2014 Peter Vukusic
- 2015 Paula Chadwick
- 2016 Stuart Farmer
- 2017 Mary Whitehouse
- 2018 Bobby Acharya
- 2019 Mark Warner and Lisa Jardine-Wright
- 2020 Nicholas St John Braithwaite
- 2022 Eilish McLoughlin
- 2024 Stephen Blundell
- 2026 Orbyts

=== The Marie Curie-Sklodowska Medal and Prize ===
Established in 2016, is awarded for "distinguished contributions to physics education and to widening participation within it."

=== The Daphne Jackson Medal and Prize ===
Established in 2016, is awarded "for exceptional early career contributions to physics education and to widening participation within it."

=== The Teacher of Physics Award ===
Since 1986, celebrates the success of secondary school physics teachers who have raised the profile of physics and science in schools.

=== The Technician Award ===
To recognise the experience of technicians and their contribution to physics

=== The Goronwy Jones prize ===
Awarded to the top-scoring A-level candidate in Physics in Wales.

== Outreach awards ==
- The Kelvin Medal and Prize is a gold medal instigated in October 1994 in recognition of the importance of promoting public awareness of the place of physics in the world, of its contributions to the quality of life and its advancement of an understanding of the physical world and the place of humanity within it.
- The Lise Meitner Medal and Prize, established in 2016, is awarded for "distinguished contributions to public engagement within physics."
- The Mary Somerville Medal and Prize

== Research awards ==
- The Isaac Newton Medal and Prize is a gold medal awarded annually to any physicist, regardless of subject area, background or nationality, for outstanding contributions to physics. It is accompanied by a prize of £1000, and the recipient is invited to give the Newton lecture.
- The Paul Dirac Medal and Prize is a gold medal awarded for outstanding and sustained contributions to theoretical physics.
- The Michael Faraday Medal and Prize is a gold medal awarded annually for outstanding contributions to experimental physics to a physicist of international reputation in any sector.
- The Richard Glazebrook Medal and Prize, established in 1965, is a gold medal awarded for "outstanding and sustained contributions to leadership in a physics context."
- The John William Strutt, Lord Rayleigh Medal and Prize, established in 2008, is awarded biennially in odd-numbered years, for distinguished research in theoretical, mathematical or computational physics.
- The Sam Edwards Medal and Prize is awarded for distinguished contributions in soft matter physics
- The Rosalind Franklin Medal and Prize is awarded for distinguished contributions to physics applied to the life sciences
- The Nevill Mott Medal and Prize is awarded for distinguished contributions to condensed matter physics
- The David Tabor Medal and Prize is awarded for distinguished contributions to surface or nanoscale physics.
- The Cecilia Payne-Gaposchkin Medal and Prize is awarded for plasma or space physics
- The Edward Appleton Medal and Prize is awarded for distinguished research in environmental, earth or atmospheric physics. Originally named after Charles Chree, it was established in 1941 and is currently awarded in even-dated years.
- The Thomas Young Medal and Prize is awarded biennially in odd-numbered years, for distinguished research in the field of optics, including physics outside the visible region.
- The Joseph Thomson Medal and Prize, established in 2008, is awarded biennially, in even-numbered years, for distinguished research in atomic physics (including quantum optics) or molecular physics.
- The Ernest Rutherford Medal and Prize, awarded biennially in even-numbered years, was instituted in 1966, replacing the Rutherford Memorial Lecture. The award recognises distinguished research in nuclear physics or nuclear technology and is named in honour of Lord Rutherford of Nelson.
- The James Chadwick Medal and Prize is awarded "for distinguished contributions to particle physics."
- The Fred Hoyle Medal and Prize is awarded for distinguished contributions to astrophysics or cosmology
- The Peter Mansfield Medal and Prize is awarded for medical physics
- The James Joule Medal and Prize is awarded for applied physics
- The James Clerk Maxwell Medal and Prize is awarded annually (previously between 1962 and 1970, every two years) to recognize outstanding early-career contributions to theoretical physics.
- The Henry Moseley Medal and Prize is awarded for exceptional early career contributions to experimental physics
- The Jocelyn Bell Burnell Medal and Prize was originally known as the 'Very Early Career Female Physicist Award'
- The Simon Memorial Prize

== Service to the IOP awards ==
- The President's Medal can be given to both physicists and non-physicists who have provided meritorious services in various fields of endeavour which were of benefit to physics in general and the Institute in particular.
- The Phillips Award is awarded for distinguished service to the Institute of Physics.

== Special Interest Group Prizes and Awards ==
Many of the Institute's special interest groups—sub-groups of the organisations members working in, or with an interest in, a specific area or sub-discipline—award prizes, typically annually. These include:

- The IOP Astroparticle Physics Group Early Career Prize, awarded on odd-numbered years to early-career researchers working at an institution in the UK and Ireland in the area of astroparticle physics who 'have five years or less postdoctoral experience (allowing for career breaks)'.
- The John Chubb Award, from the Dielectrics and Electrostatics Group for 'outstanding contributions to experimental electrostatics by early career researchers'.
- The Mansel Davies Award from the Dielectrics and Electrostatics Group is for 'outstanding contributions to dielectrics by early career researchers'.
- The High Energy Particle Physics Group Prize, awarded to 'an early career researcher for outstanding contributions to particle physics research'.
- The Liquids and Complex Fluids Early Career Award, 'given biennially to an exceptional scientist, in the early stages of their career, working in the broadly defined area of Liquids and Complex Fluids'.
- The Wohlfarth Lectureship, jointly sponsored by the Magnetism Group and the Institute of Electrical and Electronics Engineers (IEEE) Magnetics Society UK and Ireland Magnetics Chapter, which 'recognises the outstanding contribution made by Professor Peter Wohlfarth to the field of magnetism'.

== See also ==
- Institute of Physics
- List of physics awards
