= GJW =

GJW may refer to:

- Global Jet Watch, project founded by Katherine Blundell
- GJW, ICAO code for Global Jet Aruba, a Dutch Caribbean airline
- GJW Government Relations Ltd., former employer of British Deputy Prime Minister Nick Clegg
- GJW, former lobbying firm of Nigel Clarke, 2014–2022 chairman of the General Pharmaceutical Council
- GJW, abbreviation for Gyeongju World, theme park in South Korea
