= PSSC =

PSSC may refer to:

- Physical Science Study Committee, a project in the late 1950s to develop a new method of teaching high school physics
- PicoSatellite Solar Cell, a testbed deployed on STS 126
- The Puget Sound Skills Center, a multi-school district skills center in Washington
- Petroleum Steamship Company, found in the British Tanker Company article
