= Paul Black (educational researcher) =

British physicist and educational researcher (1930–2026)

Paul Black OBE CPhys HonFInstP
- Born: Paul Joseph Black; 10 September 1930; La Cumbre, Valle del Cauca, Colombia
- Died: 16 March 2026 (aged 95)
- Education: University of Manchester; University of Cambridge
- Known for: Physics; Assessment for learning
- Awards: Lawrence Bragg Medal and Prize; OBE; Honorary Fellow of Institute of Physics; Honorary Fellow of the University of Surrey
- Scientific career
- Fields: Physics; Education
- Workplaces: University of Birmingham; Nuffield Foundation; Chelsea College of Science and Technology; King's College London; Stanford University; OECD; OFQUAL

Paul Joseph Black OBE CPhys HonFInstP (10 September 1930 – 16 March 2026) was a British educational researcher, physicist and a Professor Emeritus at King's College London. He was Professor of Science Education and Director of the Centre for Science and Mathematics Education at the Chelsea College of Science and Technology and Head for Educational Studies at King's College London. Black was the Chair for the Task Group on Assessment and Testing and Deputy Chair of the National Curriculum Council, and is recognised as an architect of the national curriculum testing regime and the national curriculum for Science.

== Early life and career ==
Paul Joseph Black was born in La Cumbre, Valle del Cauca, Colombia on 10 September 1930, where his British parents William and Susie were living, before moving to Wales. He completed his first degree at the University of Manchester, going on to complete his PhD in Crystallography at the Cavendish Laboratory at the University of Cambridge in 1954. Between 1954 and 1976, Black was a faculty member in the Department of Physics in the University of Birmingham. During his time at Birmingham, he worked with Jon Ogborn of Worcester College of Higher Education, designing the Nuffield Foundation's A-Level Physics Course. During the early 1970s, Black again worked with Ogborn who was the Project co-ordinator, for The Higher Education Learning Project in Physics which was funded by the Nuffield Foundation.

== Educational research ==
In 1976, Black left the University of Birmingham and joined the Chelsea College of Science and Technology as Professor of Science Education and Director of the Centre for Science and Mathematics Education. Black became the educational advisor to the Nuffield-Chelsea Curriculum Trust at this time. Between 1978 and 1988, Black was Director for the UK government's national survey of school science performance, and also served on the Research Grants Board of the Economic and Social Research Council. In 1985, Chelsea College of Science and Technology merged with King's College London and Black continued as Professor of Science Education and became the Head for Educational Studies. He held this position until his retirement in 1995 becoming Professor Emeritus. From 1985 to 1991, Black was President of the Groupe Internationale de Recherche sur l’Enseignement de la Physique, and became chair of the International Commission on Physics Education between 1993 and 1999. Black was also a visiting professor of education at Stanford University, and continued to work with the Nuffield Foundation developing design & technology and science work at primary, secondary and tertiary levels. In 1986, Black was the president of the Association for Science Education.

During 1987–88, Black was the chair of the Task Group on Assessment and Testing set up by the UK government. The group reported to the then secretary of state for education, Kenneth Baker. The report produced by the group promoted diagnostic and formative assessment and teachers' professional development and, at a technical level, the use of criterion referencing as the assessment paradigm, and produced the original design for national curriculum testing and assessment. In 1992, Black criticised how they were implemented as the Education Reform Act

Hurried and sweeping changes to the national curriculum will cause 'serious harm' to children's education

Between 1989 and 1991, Black was the deputy chair of the National Curriculum Council. During 1996, Black wrote a report for the Organisation for Economic Cooperation and Development in which Black stated

the British science curriculum is unnecessarily dull and should be scrapped

In 1998, Black co-wrote Inside the Black Box: Raising Standards Through Classroom Assessment with Dylan Wiliam. Black, along with Wiliam were educational advisors to Tony Blair, giving evidence to the Select Committee on Education and Employment Fourth Report. In 2013, Black and Wiliam wrote a report that criticised the current assessment, stating

A-level grades are an unreliable guide to a student's ability

Black was a member of three committees of the USA National Research Council, including the National Academy of Sciences Committee on the Cognitive Foundations of Assessment, and was later a member of the Technical Advisory Group of OFQUAL. He was also a member of the British Educational Research Association and the National Academy of Education.

== Death ==
Black died on 16 March 2026, at the age of 95.

== Awards ==
Black was jointly awarded the Lawrence Bragg Medal and Prize of the Institute of Physics in 1973 for his outstanding and sustained contributions to physics education, along with Jon Ogborn. In 1983, his innovative work was recognised with an OBE for services to education. In 1991, Black was made an Honorary Fellow of the University of Surrey. The International Commission on Physics Education honoured Black with their annual medal award in 2000. In 2005, he received a Lifetime Achievement Award for Outstanding Contribution to Science Education, from the Association for Science Education, and a Lifetime Achievement Award from the US National Association for Research in Science Teaching. In 2009, Black won the International Society for Design and Development in Education Prize for Design in Education (The Eddie) Lifetime Achievement Award.

== Selected writings ==
- The Voigt profile of Mossbauer transmission spectra with M.J. Evans, March 2001, Journal of Physics, C Solid State Physics 3(10):2167, doi:10.1088/0022-3719/3/10/020
- Interference between nuclear resonant and Rayleigh-Thomson scattering from magnetized crystals of iron with D.E. Evans, March 2001, Journal of Physics, F Metal Physics 2(2):219, doi:10.1088/0305-4608/2/2/010
- Feedback is the best nourishment with Dylan Wiliam, TES, 4 October 2002
- Testing, motivation and learning with Patricia Broafoot, Richard Daugherty and John Gardner, University of Cambridge School of Education, ISBN 0856030465, January 2002
- Standards in Public Examinations with Dylan Wiliam, King's College London Department of Education and Professional Studies, ISBN 1871984343 January 2002
- Assessment for Learning: Putting It Into Practice with Christine Harrison, Claire Lee, Bethan Marshall and Dylan Wiliam, Open University Press, ISBN 978-0335212972, September 2003
- Assessment in science: A guide to professional development and classroom practice, July 2003, Science Education, 87(4):613-615, doi:10.1002/sce.10097
- Redefining Assessment? The First Ten Years of Assessment in Education with Patricia Broadfoot, March 2004, Assessment in Education Principles Policy and Practice, 11(1):7-26, doi:10.1080/0969594042000208976
- The reliability of assessments with Dylan Wiliam, Sage, January 2005, doi:10.4135/9781446250808.n15
- The Formative Purpose: Assessment Must First Promote Learning with Dylan Wiliam, April 2005, Yearbook of the National Society for the Study of Education, 103(2):20 - 50, doi:10.1111/j.1744-7984.2004.tb00047.x
- Learning how to Learn and Assessment for Learning with Robert Mccormick, Mary James and David Pedder, June 2006, Research Papers in Education, 21(2), doi:10.1080/02671520600615612
- School pupils’ beliefs about learning with Joanna Swann and Dylan Wiliam, June 2006, Research Papers in Education, 21(2):151-170, doi:10.1080/02671520600615661
- Large-scale assessment systems: Design principles drawn from international comparisons 1 with Dylan Wiliam, April 2007, Measurement Interdisciplinary Research and Perspectives, 5(1):1-53, doi:10.1080/15366360701293386
- Formative Assessment Issues Across the Curriculum: The Theory and the Practice, January 2009, TESOL Quarterly 43(3), doi:10.1002/j.1545-7249.2009.tb00248.x
- Reflections and new directions with Robert McCormick, August 2010, Assessment & Evaluation in Higher Education, 35(5):493-499, doi:10.1080/02602938.2010.493696
- Road Maps for Learning: A Guide to the Navigation of Learning Progressions with Mark Wilson and Shih-Ying Yao, April 2011, Measurement Interdisciplinary Research and Perspectives, 9(2):71-123, doi:10.1080/15366367.2011.591654
- EPMA Professionals—Servants or Masters?, January 2012, Measurement Interdisciplinary Research and Perspectives, 10(1-2):33-37, doi:10.1080/15366367.2012.677342
- Pedagogy in Theory and in Practice: Formative and Summative Assessments in Classrooms and in Systems, November 2013, doi:10.1007/978-94-007-6668-6_11
- Formative assessment – an optimistic but incomplete vision, January 2015, Assessment in Education Principles Policy and Practice, 22(1), doi:10.1080/0969594X.2014.999643
- Celebration of the past—challenge for the future, May 2016, Physics Education, 51(3):030103, doi:10.1088/0031-9120/51/3/030103
- Assessment in Science Education, January 2017, In book: Science Education (pp. 295–309), doi:10.1007/978-94-6300-749-8_22
- Helping students to become capable learners, March 2018, European Journal of Education, 53(2), doi:10.1111/ejed.12273
