= School council =

School council may refer to:

- School Council, a teacher-student joint council system and house system of public schools in Myanmar (Burma)
- Schools Council, school exam coordinator in England and Wales
- Student council, organization of school students
- Students' union, organization of students, usually college or university
