= Becky Parker =

British physicist and physics teacher

Becky Parker MBE HonFInstP
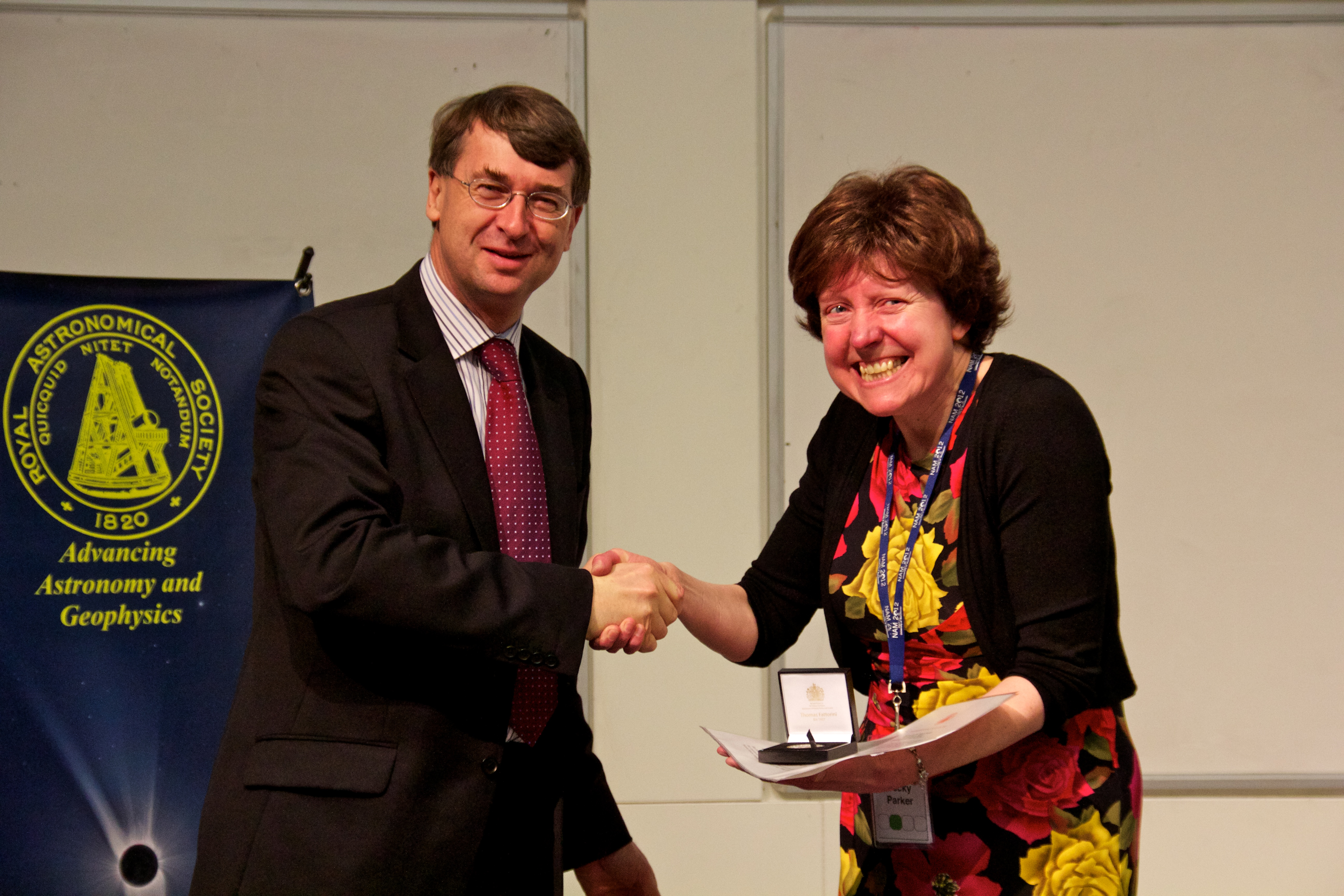
- Becky Parker (right) receiving the Patrick Moore Medal in 2012
- Awards: Lawrence Bragg Medal and Prize; Royal Astronomical Society Patrick Moore Medal

Academic background
- Education: University of Sussex

Academic work
- Discipline: physics
- Institutions: Queen Mary University of London; University of Kent

Becky Parker MBE HonFInstP is a British physicist and physics teacher based in Kent. She is a visiting professor at School of Physics and Astronomy, Queen Mary University of London.

== Early life and education ==
Parker obtained a physics degree at the University of Sussex in 1980 before moving to Chicago to complete as Borg Warner Fellow for the MA in Conceptual Foundations of Science. She worked in the group of Bob Geroch, with Subrahmanyan Chandrasekhar attending one of her seminars.

== Research and career ==
Whilst studying at Chicago, Parker was dismayed at the lack of women in physics. After enjoying a summer working at Adler Planetarium, she returned to the University of Sussex to complete a PGCE in order to encourage more school girls to study it.

Parker was head of physics at Simon Langton Grammar School for Boys in Canterbury, Kent, which accepts girls at sixth form. At the time Parker taught there, it was estimated that 2% of female physicists at University across the UK had attended the school. From 2002 to 2005, she was a senior lecturer in the School of Physical Sciences at the University of Kent in Canterbury, and was also the Schools first Outreach officer, responsible for pioneering its outreach program at a time when Physics and Chemistry undergraduate intake was declining across the UK university sector as a whole, and outreach and public engagement were the exception rather than the rule. She has since acted as an advisor for museums, exam boards and educational committees. In 2010, Parker was listed by the Women in Science and Engineering (WISE) campaign as a 'female Brian Cox'.

In 2014 Parker was awarded an honorary fellowship of the Institute of Physics for her contributions to physics education.

== Institute for Research in Schools ==
Parker's interest in school research began in 2007 during a school trip to CERN, when her students were inspired to enter a Surrey Satellite Technology competition to design a space experiment. After many successful research projects in the Simon Langton Grammar School for Boys, Parker opened The Langton Star Centre.

The Institute for Research in Schools, a national charitable organisation supporting students and teachers to engage in collaborative, authentic research across a range of scientific disciplines was officially launched in March 2016 by Parker. She realised during her own academic career that more school children should be involved in scientific research, with young people being given credit for how innovative and intelligent they are.

What began as an astrophysics project, with school groups using the Faulkes Telescope to make their own astrophysical observations, became something much more elaborate. Today a flagship IRIS projected allows school students to collaborate with CERN (CERN @ School), supported by the UK's Science and Technology Facilities Council, the Institute of Physics and SEPnet. Dr Jonathan Eastwood of Imperial College London described a new style cosmic ray detector designed by school students as the "UK's latest space facility". To build the detector, Parker raised in excess of £60,000, using initial funds from the British National Space Centre. NASA were so interested in the detector that they took several up to the International Space Station. Data were collected, analysed and processed by students who were sitting their GCSEs. "Genomic Decoders", launched in partnership with the Wellcome Genome Campus, focuses on the first ever annotation of the parasitic human whipworm genome.

Since its launch, IRIS has expanded, providing several genuine research opportunities for school students. Since its launch, IRIS has since received considerable media attention, and Parker's former role as Director. It was given as evidence for the 2017 House of Commons Science and Technology Select Committee report on Science Communication and Engagement.

== Awards ==
- 2008 - MBE in Queen's Birthday Honours
- 2009 - Institute of Physics Lawrence Bragg Medal and Prize
- 2012 - Royal Astronomical Society Patrick Moore Medal
