= Patterson Hume =

Canadian computer scientist and physicist (b. 1923, d. 2013)

- Born: James Nairn Patterson Hume; 17 March 1923; Brooklyn, New York, U.S.
- Died: 9 May 2013 (aged 90); Toronto, Ontario, Canada
- Occupations: physicist, computer scientist, university professor
- Known for: The Nature of Things, Frames of Reference, Computer programming pioneer.
- Spouse: Patricia Anne (née Molyneux) Hume (1922–2017; m. 1953)
- Children: Stephen, Philip, Harriet, Mark
- Awards: Member of Order of Canada, Edison Foundation Special Citation for best science education film 1962, Fellow of Royal Society of Canada, Fellow of the ACM, IFIP Silver Core Award, Sandford Fleming Medal

Academic background
- Education: B.A. 1945, M.A. 1946, PhD 1949
- Alma mater: University of Toronto

Academic work
- Institutions: University of Toronto, Massey College, Canadian Broadcasting Corporation

Patterson Hume

Master of Massey College
- In office 1981–1988
- Preceded by: Robertson Davies
- Succeeded by: Ann Saddlemyer

James Nairn Patterson "Pat" Hume CM FRSC (17 March 1923 – 9 May 2013) was a Canadian professor and science educator who has been called "Canada's pioneer of computer programming". He was a professor of Physics and of Computer Science at the University of Toronto, and he served as the second Master of Massey College from 1981 to 1988.

== Life and career ==
Hume received a B.A. in mathematics and physics in 1945, an M.A. in physics in 1946 and a PhD in physics in 1949 (theoretical atomic spectroscopy) from the University of Toronto. From 1946 to 1949 he taught returning soldiers mathematics at the University of Toronto campus in Ajax. He was an instructor in physics at Rutgers University in New Jersey between 1949 and 1950 before rejoining the University of Toronto as an assistant professor of physics.

In 1953, Hume and Beatrice Worsley began development of Transcode, a new computer language for the Ferranti Mark 1 machine known as FERUT.

In collaboration with his colleague Donald Ivey, he helped to steer the teaching of physics in a new direction through the use of educational television programs and movies. Starting in 1958 Hume and Ivey prepared and presented over one hundred television programs for the Canadian Broadcasting Corporation on various physics topics. Short films for the PSSC such as Frames of Reference and the CBC TV show The Nature of Things used humour and creative camerawork to make physics accessible to a wider range of students. In 1958 with Calvin Gotlieb he published High-speed Data Processing, the first book on using computers in business which was "recognized by The Oxford English Dictionary in twelve computer-related entries: block, character, datum, generator, housekeeping, in-line, interpreter, keyboard, logical, loop, matrix and simulate".

In 1964, with Calvin Gotlieb and Thomas Hull, he founded the Computer Science department at the University of Toronto.

With Ric Holt, he co-authored many computer programming textbooks, for SP/k, Fortran, Pascal, Turing and Java.

Hume was the second Master of Massey College, Toronto having been a Senior Fellow since 1973.

Upon his retirement, he was appointed Professor Emeritus in 1988.

In 2002, he was inducted into the Canadian Information Productivity Awards (CIPA) Hall of Fame. In 2006 he was awarded an Honorary D.Sc. from Queen's University School of Computing.

He was an active member of The Arts and Letters Club of Toronto and for many years collaborated with Jack Yokom to produce the Annual Spring Review.

He died on 9 May 2013.

In 2014 Hume was given a Lifetime Achievement Award from the Canadian Association of Computer Science including for "the world's first long-distance use of a computer".

For the education work he carried out with Ivey, an asteroid (number 22415) was named HumeIvey in their honour.

== Sources ==
- On Beyond Darwin, Chapter 1
- In Memoriam: University of Toronto Magazine
- In Memoriam: Department of Computer Science
