= Dylan Wiliam =

Welsh educationalist

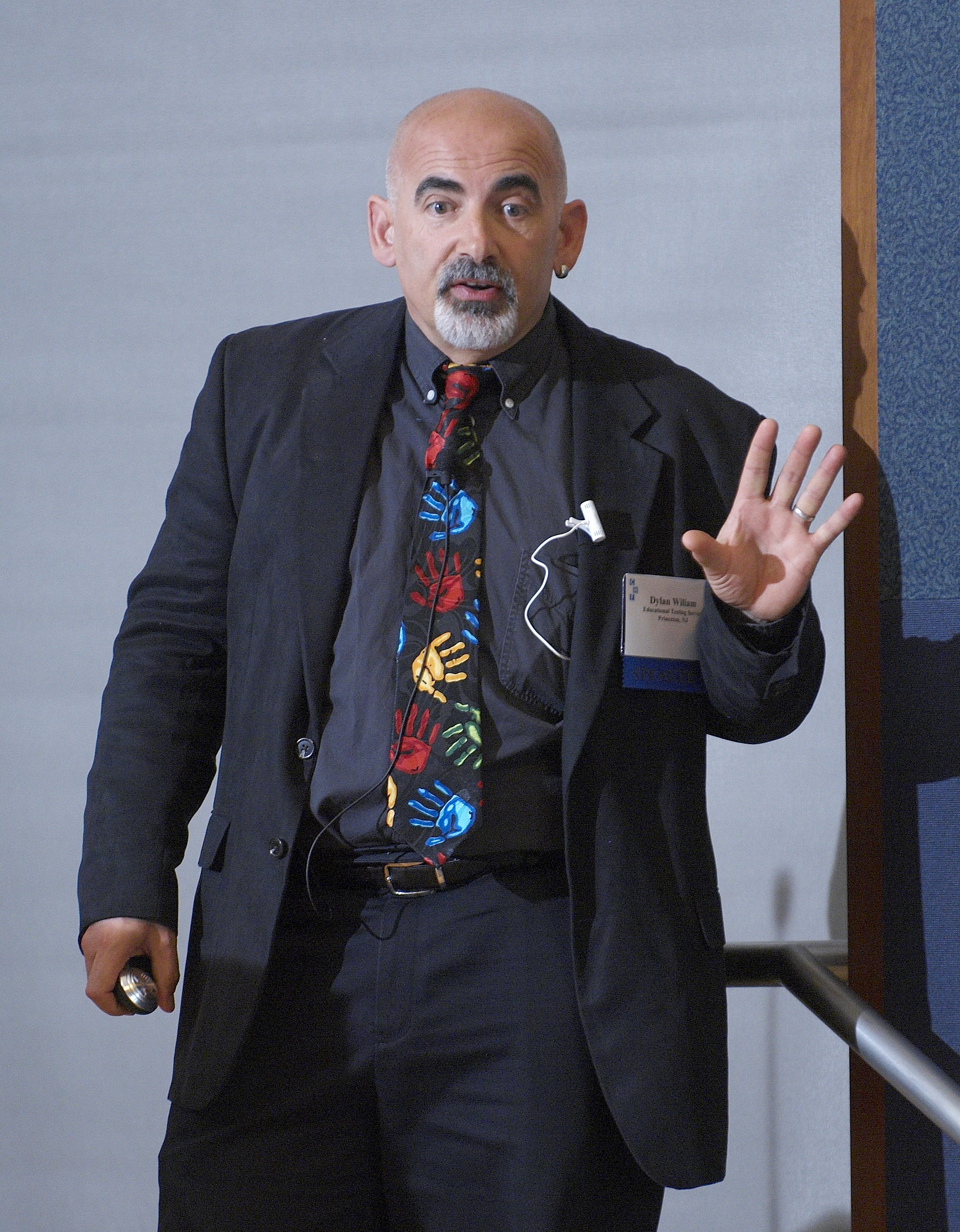
- Wiliam in 2006
- Born: Dylan ap Rhys Wiliam; North Wales
- Education: Whitchurch Grammar School; Altrincham Grammar School for Boys
- Alma mater: Durham University (BSc); Open University (BA); Polytechnic of the South Bank (MSc); University of London (PhD)
- Known for: Assessment for learning
- Scientific career
- Fields: Education
- Workplaces: University College London; King's College London
- Thesis: Technical issues in the development and implementation of a system of criterion-referenced age-independent levels of attainment in the National Curriculum of England and Wales (1993)
- Website: dylanwiliam.org dylanwiliamcenter.com

Dylan ap Rhys Wiliam is a Welsh educationalist. He is emeritus professor of educational assessment at the UCL Institute of Education. He lives in Bradford County, Florida, United States.

== Early life and education ==
Born in North Wales, Wiliam grew up in a monoglot Welsh-speaking family. He did not learn English until attending Whitchurch Grammar School in Cardiff and Altrincham Grammar School for Boys in Greater Manchester. He continued further education at the University of Durham (Bachelor of Science, 1976), the Open University (Bachelor of Arts, 1983), the Polytechnic of the South Bank (Master of Science, 1985) and the University of London (PhD, 1993).

== Research and career ==
His research focus is the professional development of teachers. His 1998 book, Inside the Black Box, which he wrote with Paul Black, was a successful polemic about formative assessment, selling over 100,000 copies. Wiliam, along with Black were educational advisors to Tony Blair, and in 2013 Wiliam and Black wrote a report that criticised the current assessment, stating "A-level grades are an unreliable guide to a student's ability." He demonstrated his ideas in a 2010 BBC documentary series, The Classroom Experiment, in which a class at Hertswood School was encouraged to participate more widely in activities such as answering questions. He further expands on these ideas in his 2011 book, Embedded Formative Assessment, which describes five key strategies of effective formative assessment in the classroom.

According to Google Scholar and Scopus his most cited peer reviewed publications are on assessment for learning (AFL) and formative assessment.
