= Mark Warner (physicist) =

British theoretical physicist, FRS (1952–2021)

Mark Warner FRS (26 January 1952 – 24 December 2021) was a New Zealand-British physicist. He was a pioneer in the field of liquid crystal elastomers, and proponent of physics education in the UK.

== Life ==
Born and raised in New Zealand, Mark Warner arrived in the UK after being awarded a scholarship in 1969 to study at Corpus Christi College, Cambridge, where he would be based for the majority of his career.

After completing his PhD on the molecular motion of polymeric systems, he moved to Stanford for a postdoctoral position that introduced him to liquid crystals, the field that would define his research career. Recognition of his work in liquid crystal elastomers included the 2003 EuroPhysics Prize from the European Physical Society.

Beyond research, Mark also played an important role in physics education in schools, culminating in the Isaac Physics program, which he founded with Prof. Lisa Jardine-Wright. They were awarded IOP Lawrence Bragg Medal and Prize for this initiative.

He was made an Honorary Fellow of the Royal Society of New Zealand in 2002, and Fellow of the Royal Society in 2012.
