= Lynn Kamerlin =

Computational chemist and biochemist

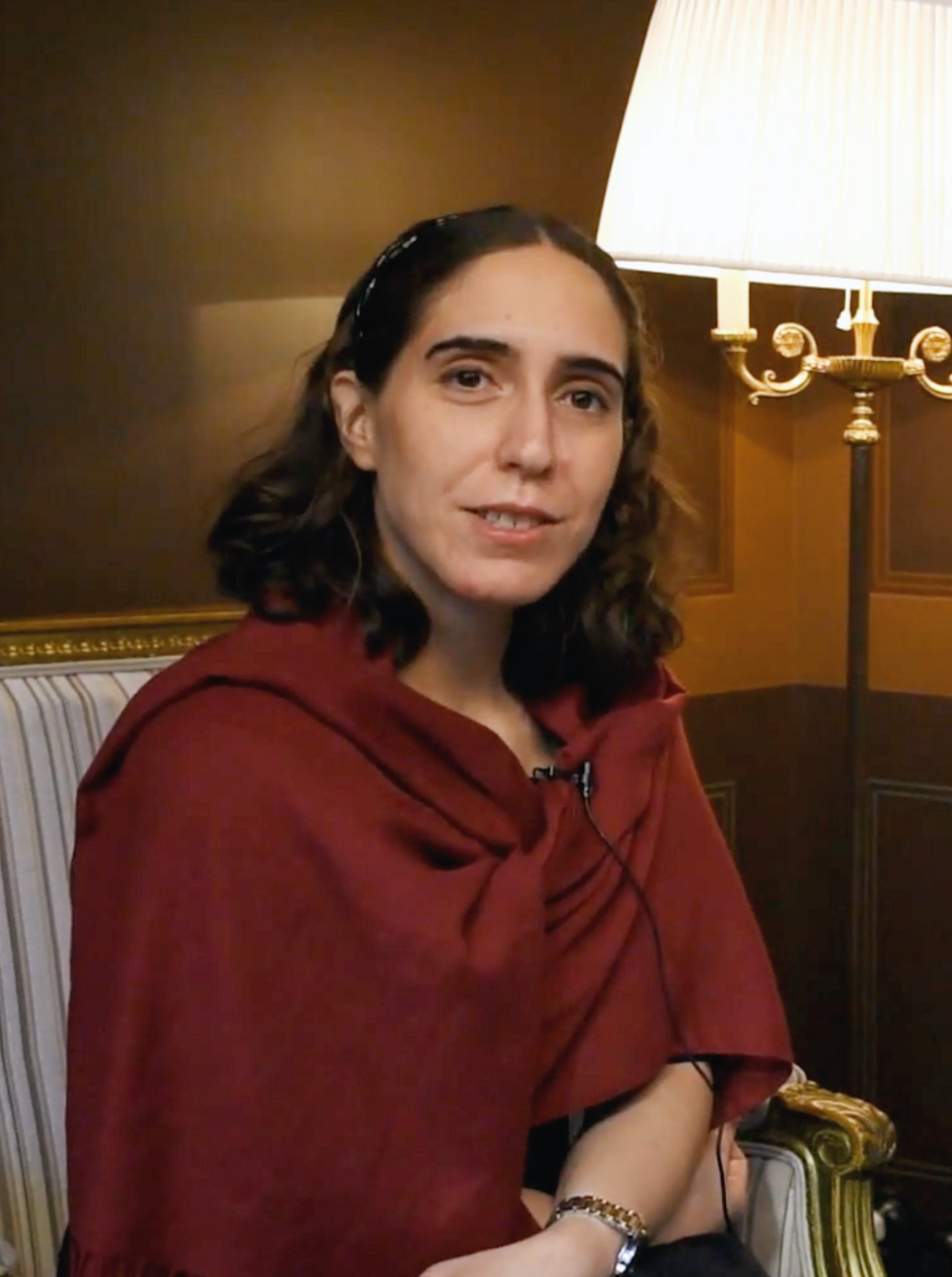
- Lynn Kamerlin in 2016
- Born: Shina Caroline Lynn Kamerlin; 1981 (age 44–45); London, United Kingdom
- Education: University of Birmingham (MNatSc; PhD)
- Known for: Enzyme mechanisms, protein evolution, molecular design
- Awards: Fellow of the Institute of Physics (2026)
- Scientific career
- Fields: Computational chemistry, Biochemistry, Biophysics

Shina Caroline Lynn Kamerlin (born 1981) is a computational chemist and biochemist known for her research on enzyme mechanisms, protein evolution, and molecular design. She is a professor in the School of Chemistry and Biochemistry at the Georgia Institute of Technology.

Kamerlin's research focuses on using computational chemistry and molecular simulations to understand how enzymes function and evolve, with applications in biotechnology and medicine.

== Biography ==
Kamerlin was born to a family with Iranian Kurdish and Swedish roots. She grew up between different cultural and linguistic environments, an experience she has described as shaping both her identity and her scientific career. She later studied natural sciences at the University of Birmingham, where she completed both her undergraduate studies and a PhD in theoretical organic chemistry.

== Career ==
In 2026, Kamerlin was elected a Fellow of the Institute of Physics, the highest grade of membership of the professional society, in recognition of her scientific contributions to computational biophysics and related fields.
