= Uschi Steigenberger =

German physicist (1951–2018)

Uschi Steigenberger OBE
- fair use only
- Born: Ursula Steigenberger; 25 April 1951
- Died: 12 December 2018 (aged 67)
- Education: University of Würzburg
- Scientific career
- Fields: Condensed matter physics
- Workplaces: ISIS neutron source Rutherford Appleton Laboratory; Institut Laue–Langevin; Lebedev Physical Institute

Ursula "Uschi" Steigenberger (25 April 1951 — 12 December 2018) OBE FInstP was a German condensed matter physicist and director of the ISIS neutron source. She was one of the founders of the Institute of Physics Juno Award.

== Education ==
Steigenberger was born in Augsburg. She studied physics at the University of Würzburg, where she remained for her graduate studies. She earned a PhD in condensed matter physics under the supervision of Michael von Ortenburg. For her doctoral thesis she designed a stress rig, which allowed her to apply uniaxial pressure to single crystals of tellurium. After earning her PhD in 1981, Steigenberger worked in various magnet labs, including the CNRS Grenoble High Field Magnet Facility in Grenoble and Lebedev Physical Institute in Moscow.

== Career and research ==
Steigenberger joined the Institut Laue–Langevin in 1982. She worked on the PRogetto dell'Istituto di Strutura della MAteria del CNR (PRISMA) spectrometer with collaborators in Italy, and continued to work with them on the motion of molecules. She worked on cadmium telluride that had been alloyed with magnesium. Here she met British physicist Keith McEwen, whom she married in 1986 before the couple moved to the United Kingdom.

Steigenberger joined the ISIS neutron source in 1986. She was initially responsible for the PRISMA spectrometer, leading a collaboration between the Engineering and Physical Sciences Research Council (EPSRC) and Italian Consiglio Nazionale delle Ricerche. PRISMA was used for inelastic neutron scattering from single crystals. It can measure the change in scattering during the application of temperature, pressure or magnetic fields. Steigenberger was made one of the ISIS Excitations Group leaders, becoming the first woman Division Head in 1994. She attended the Oxford School on Neutron Scattering in 1991. In 1996 Steigenberger coordinated a workshop on pulsed neutron experiments. She served as director at the ISIS neutron source from 2011 to 2012. She worked with scientists from Norway to create Larmor, a high-intensity small-angle scattering instrument that uses a beam of polarised neutrons to study the movement of atoms in a material. Steigenberger served as Chair of the Helmholtz-Zentrum Berlin. She retired from the ISIS neutron source in 2013. Her work was recognised by scientists all over the world, developing important partnerships with Japan and Italy.

== Awards and honours ==
Steigenberger was shortlisted for a WISE Campaign Lifetime Achievement Award. She was a Fellow of the Institute of Physics, and part of their review of women in the physics workplace that led to the Juno award scheme as well as being a member of their Science Board. In the 2016 New Year Honours she was appointed Officer of the Order of the British Empire (OBE) for services to science, which she collected in 2017. This OBE was honorary as Steigenberger kept her German citizenship whilst working in the UK.

== Death ==
Steigenberger was diagnosed with pancreatic cancer in January 2017, and died on 12 December 2018.
