= Eric M. Rogers =

British physicist

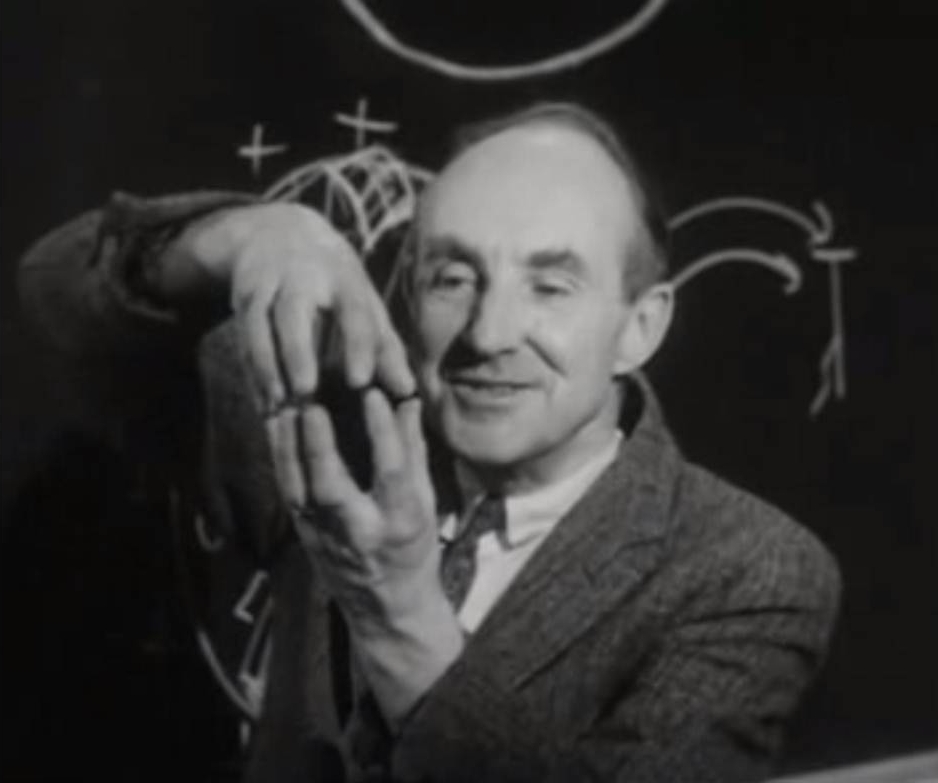
- Rogers demonstrating in the film Coulomb's Law (1959).
- Born: 15 August 1902; Bickley, United Kingdom
- Died: 1 July 1990; Cambridge, United Kingdom
- Occupations: physics educator and author
- Known for: Physics for the Inquiring Mind

Eric M. Rogers (15 August 1902 – 1 July 1990) was a British writer and physics educator. He is perhaps best known for his 1960 textbook Physics for the Inquiring Mind. The book, subtitled The Methods, Nature, and Philosophy of Physical Science, was based on courses he gave at Princeton University, where he taught from 1942 to 1971. Rogers also headed the Nuffield Science Teaching Project programme in physics education in the 1960s.

== Life and work ==
Eric Rogers was born on 15 August 1902 at Bickley, Kent. His father, Charles Knight Rogers was a publisher for the International News Co. Ltd. Eric Rogers went to Bedales School from 1916 to 1921. Bedales school and its founder John Haden Badley had a strong influence on Rogers . At Bedales school Eric Rogers was involved in various ventures, and during his last year at the school was elected as the Head Boy, and Editor of the school magazine.

Rogers went to Trinity College, Cambridge gaining first class honours both in Mathematics Tripos Part 1 in 1922 and Natural Science Tripos Part 2 in 1924. He was elected a senior scholar in 1923. He did a short term of research and teaching in the Cavendish Laboratory from 1924 to 1925, which ended in his posting as physics master and assistant house master at Clifton College, Bristol. He remained there from 1925 to 1928.

In 1928, Rogers joined Bedales school a physics teacher and boys' house-master. Here Rogers met Janet Drummond a history teacher. They became engaged in April 1930, and eloped before the term ended to get married on 14 June 1930.

After this, Rogers became an instructor in physics at Harvard University for two years. Rogers returned to England in 1932 and joined Charterhouse School as physics master, until 1937.

In 1937, he went back to USA to join the Putney School for three years. He was then appointed at Mount Holyoke College (1940–41) and St Paul's, Concord (1941–42). In 1942, he joined Princeton University as associate professor. Rogers retired as professor from Princeton University in 1971.

Rogers was also a member of the Physical Sciences Study Committee (PSSC). In 1962, he became a consultant on the Nuffield O-Level physics project, and he became the organizer of the project in 1963. He had a considerable impact on the project.

Rogers presented the 1979 Royal Institution Christmas Lectures on the subject of atoms.

Rogers' wife and sister died in 1971 and 1972 respectively, which disrupted his retirement plans. Rogers died on 1 July 1990 in Cambridge.

Wonder and Delight, published in 1994 (Institute of Physics), is a book dedicated to the works and philosophy of Eric Rogers. The book's subtitle is Essays in Science Education in honour of the life and work of Eric Rogers (1902–1990). A biography of Eric Rogers was included.

== Awards ==
In 1969, Rogers received the Oersted Medal, which is given by the American Association of Physics Teachers. In 1980 he became the inaugural recipient of the Physics Education Medal, awarded by the International Commission on Physics Education, and in 1985 he was given the Lawrence Bragg Medal of the Institute of Physics. Eric Rogers was a fellow of the Institute of Physics, the American Physical Society, and a member of the European Physical Society.

== Selected writings ==
- Eric M. Rogers (1969). "Examinations: Powerful Agents for Good or Ill in Teaching". Am. J. Phys. 37 (10): 954–962. Bibcode:1969AmJPh..37..954R. doi:10.1119/1.1975217.
- Eric M. Rogers; Reviewer: Philip Youngner (1963). "Book Review: Physics for the Inquiring Mind". The Physics Teacher. 1 (1): 39–40. Bibcode:1963PhTea...1...39R. doi:10.1119/1.2350566.
- Eric M. Rogers; Reviewer: Francis L. Friedman (1962). "Book Review: Physics for the Inquiring Mind". Am. J. Phys. 30 (9): 660–661. Bibcode:1962AmJPh..30..660R. doi:10.1119/1.1942162.
- Eric M. Rogers (1961). "Physics Summer Institute in Pakistan". Am. J. Phys. 29 (10): 661–665. Bibcode:1961AmJPh..29..661R. doi:10.1119/1.1937547.
- Eric M. Rogers (1949). "The "Block-and-Gap" Scheme for Physics Courses". Am. J. Phys. 17 (1): 532–541. Bibcode:1949AmJPh..17..532R. doi:10.1119/1.1989689.
- Eric M. Rogers (1947). "Aim of Laboratory Experiments for Liberal Arts Students". Am. J. Phys. 15 (1): 80–81. Bibcode:1947AmJPh..15...80R. doi:10.1119/1.1990900.
- Eric M. Rogers (1946). "Samples Versus Survey in Physics Courses for Liberal Arts Students". Am. J. Phys. 14 (6): 384–386. Bibcode:1946AmJPh..14..384R. doi:10.1119/1.1990873.
- Eric M. Rogers (1946). "Demonstration Experiment: Mechanical Analogs of Electric Circuits". Am. J. Phys. 14 (5): 318–319. Bibcode:1946AmJPh..14..318R. doi:10.1119/1.1990850.
- Eric M. Rogers (1946). "Demonstration Experiment: Magnetized Ring". Am. J. Phys. 14 (4): 273. Bibcode:1946AmJPh..14..273R. doi:10.1119/1.1990833.

== Films ==
- Eric M. Rogers, Richard Leacock (director) (1959). Coulomb's Law. Educational Services Inc. Physical Science Study Committee (PSSC) film.
