= Phil Diamond =

British astronomer

Phil Diamond CBE HonFInstP
- Born: Philip John Diamond; February 18, 1958 (age 68); Bude, Cornwall, United Kingdom
- Citizenship: UK
- Education: University of Leeds (BSc); University of Manchester (PhD)
- Known for: Jodrell Bank Observatory; Square Kilometre Array; MERLIN
- Scientific career
- Fields: Radio astronomy
- Workplaces: University of Manchester; Jodrell Bank Observatory
- Thesis: MERLIN observations of the circumstellar envelopes around OH/IR stars (1982)

Philip John Diamond CBE HonFInstP is the Director General of the Square Kilometre Array (SKA) Organisation. He was the director of the Jodrell Bank Centre for Astrophysics from 1 October 2006 until 2010. He was the Chief of CSIRO's Astronomy and Space Sciences Division from 1 June 2010 to October 2012.

== Education ==
Diamond was educated at the University of Leeds ( Bachelor of Science 1979) and the University of Manchester where he was awarded a PhD in Radio astronomy in 1982 for work on MERLIN and OH/IR stars.

== Research ==
Diamond's research focuses on astrophysical masers.

== Honours and awards ==
Diamond was appointed Commander of the Order of the British Empire (CBE) in the 2024 New Year Honours for services to global radio astronomy. He is an Honorary Fellow of the Institute of Physics (HonFInstP), awarded for his "contributions to the physics community through his work at the Institute of Physics."
