= Physics Education =

- Discipline: Physics education
- Language: English
- Edited by: Gary Williams

Publication details
- History: 1966-present
- Publisher: IOP Publishing (United Kingdom)
- Frequency: Bimonthly
- Impact factor: 1.2 (2020)

Standard abbreviations
- ISO 4: Phys. Educ.

Indexing
- CODEN: PHEDA7
- ISSN: 0031-9120 (print); 1361-6552 (web)

Links
- Journal homepage

Physics Education is a peer-reviewed academic journal that covers the teaching of physics at the secondary school and introductory undergraduate levels. Its scope includes ideas and guidance for classroom teaching, demonstrations and laboratory experiments, international news on education developments, book reviews, equipment and multimedia products. The editor-in-chief is Gary Williams. The journal is abstracted and indexed in Inspec and ERIC/CIJE.

The conception of the journal was first discussed by the Institute in 1964. The journal was launched in 1966, with Kevin Keohane as its first editor.
