= Eleanor Campbell (scientist) =

Scottish chemist

Eleanor E.B. Campbell FRSE FRS FRSC FInstP
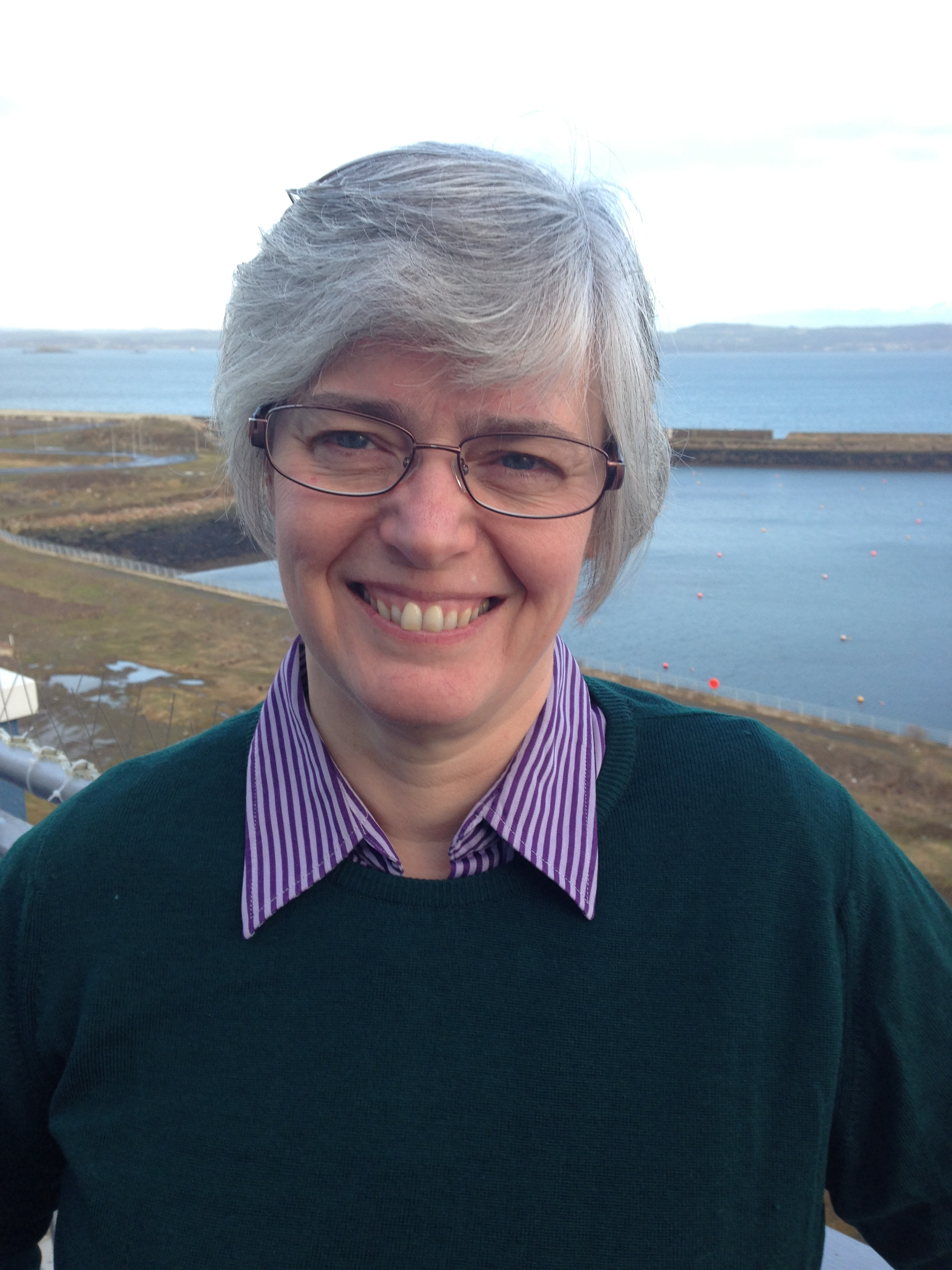
- Born: 13 April 1960 (age 66); Rothesay, Scotland
- Education: University of Edinburgh
- Spouse(s): Iain Campbell (1984–1991); Professor Mats Jonson (2003–)
- Awards: FRSE (2004); Royal Swedish Academy of Science (foreign member) (2005); Fellow of the Royal Society of Chemistry (2008); Fellow of the Institute of Physics (2008); FRS (2010)
- Scientific career
- Workplaces: University of Edinburgh; Freiburg University; Max Born Institut; University of Gothenburg
- Thesis: Electronic to rovibrational excitation in fast atom-molecule collisions (1985)
- Doctoral advisor: Malcolm Fluendy

Eleanor Elizabeth Bryce Campbell FRSE FRS FRSC FInstP (born 13 April 1960) is a Scottish scientist who held the Chair of Chemistry at the University of Edinburgh.

== Education ==
Campbell was born in 1960 in Rothesay on the Isle of Bute in Scotland to Isobel and William Cowan. She was schooled at Rothesay Academy before going on to study for a BSc in Chemical Physics at the University of Edinburgh, passing with first class honours in 1982. She remained at the university for further 4 years studying for a PhD, which she gained in 1986, on the topic of Electronic to rovibrational excitation in fast atom-molecule collisions. She then went to the University of Freiburg having received a habilitation in experimental physics.

== Academic career ==
After her time as assistant professor at the University of Freiburg, Campbell became a departmental head at the Max-Born Institut in 1993. In 1998 she was made Chair of Atomic and Molecular Physics at University of Gothenburg, Sweden, before returning to the University of Edinburgh in to take up a post as Chair of Physical Chemistry in 2007 and then Chair of Chemistry 2013.

Campbell was elected as a Foreign Member of the Royal Swedish Academy of Sciences (physics class) in 2005 and a Fellow of the Royal Society of Edinburgh in 2004. In 2010 she was elected a Fellow of the Royal Society for her contribution to the understanding of relaxation channels and reorganisational dynamics of highly excited molecules and surfaces through experimental research. She was made a Fellow of the Royal Society of Chemistry and a Fellow of the Institute of Physics in 2008. In 2018 she was elected as a member of the Academia Europaea.

Campbell retired in the summer of 2025 and became Professors Emeritus at the University of Edinburgh, School of Chemistry.

== Current work ==
Campbell's group at the University of Edinburgh study the fundamental ionisation mechanisms and excited state dynamics of complex molecules in the gas phase using femtosecond laser spectroscopy. They also study carbon nanomaterials and develop microporous carbon-based materials for gas capture and storage.
