= Frames of Reference =

- Directed by: Richard Leacock
- Written by: Professors Patterson Hume and Donald Ivey
- Produced by: Physical Science Study Committee
- Starring: Professors Donald Ivey and Patterson Hume
- Cinematography: Abraham Morochnik
- Release date: 1960 (Toronto)
- Running time: 27 minutes
- Country: Canada
- Language: English

Frames of Reference is a 1960 black-and-white educational film directed by Richard Leacock, written and presented by Patterson Hume and Donald Ivey, and produced for the Physical Science Study Committee.

A recording of this audio was utilized in the Bluecoats Drum and Bugle Corps 2015 show, Kinetic Noise.

== Synopsis ==
The film was made to be shown in high school physics courses and humor is employed both to hold students' interest and to demonstrate the concepts being discussed. In the film, University of Toronto physics professors Patterson Hume and Donald Ivey explain the distinction between inertial and noninertial frames of reference, while demonstrating these concepts through humorous camera tricks. For example, the film opens with Dr. Hume, who appears to be upside down, accusing Dr. Ivey of being upside down. Only when the pair flip a coin and it floats up does it become obvious that Dr. Ivey — and the camera — are indeed inverted.
