= Beatrice Worsley =

First female computer scientist in Canada

- Born: Beatrice Helen Worsley; 18 October 1921 (Note: Worsley's gravestone states her birth year as 1922, while the official Registro Civil in Mexico has her birth year listed as 1921.); Querétaro City, Mexico
- Died: 8 May 1972 (aged 50); Waterloo, Ontario, Canada
- Resting place: Mount Pleasant Cemetery, Toronto, Canada
- Other name: Trixie
- Education: University of Toronto; Massachusetts Institute of Technology; University of Cambridge
- Known for: Early PhD in computing, first program run on EDSAC
- Scientific career
- Fields: Computer science
- Workplaces: Queen's University; University of Toronto
- Thesis: Serial Programming for Real and Idealised Digital Calculating Machines (submitted 1952; awarded 1954)
- Doctoral advisor: Douglas Hartree

Beatrice Helen Worsley (18 October 1921 – 8 May 1972), better known as "Trixie" Worsely, was a Canadian computer scientist, the first woman in the country to work in that profession. She received her Ph.D. from the University of Cambridge with Douglas Hartree as adviser, also with advice from Alan Turing, one of the earliest Ph.D.s to be granted in what would today be known as computer science, in parallel with David Wheeler's Ph.D. studies at Cambridge under Maurice Wilkes. She wrote the first program to run on EDSAC, co-wrote the first compiler for Toronto's Ferranti Mark 1, wrote numerous papers in computer science, and taught computers and engineering at Queen's University and the University of Toronto for over 20 years before her death at the early age of 50.

== Early life ==
Beatrice was born on 18 October 1921 to Joel and Beatrice Marie (nee Trinker). Joel was born in 1887 to a working-class family in Ashton-Under-Lyne, Manchester. Beatrice Marie's grandparents had started a textile mill in Xia, Mexico, in the 1850s, and in 1908, Joel and Beatrice Marie moved to work at the plant. The plant was destroyed by rebels around 1917, and Joel took a job in El Salto with the Rio Grande group's CIMSA mills, rising to become the general manager.

Beatrice Marie gave birth to a son in 1920, Charles Robert, and then Beatrice Helen the next year. The two were homeschooled for security reasons, having little interaction with their neighbours. In 1929, Joel moved the family to Toronto to provide better schooling for his children. Charles entered Upper Canada College, while Beatrice started at Brown Public School, but moved to Bishop Strachan School in 1935.

Bishop Strachan offered two tracks, and Beatrice enrolled in the more difficult university prep courses. She excelled to the point that the headmaster stated she was one of the best students to attend the school. She graduated in 1939 with awards in maths, science, and for having the highest overall grade, earned the Governor General's Award.

== Undergraduate studies ==
Worsley won the Burnside Scholarship in Science from Trinity College, part of the University of Toronto (U of T), and began studies in September 1939. Her high marks won her the first Alexander T. Fulton Scholarship in Science.

For her second year, she transferred to the Mathematics and Physics division, an applied program rather than a theoretical one. In her third year, Worsley won the James Scott Scholarship in Mathematics and Physics. Graduating in 1944 in mathematics and physics with a Bachelor of Arts, she had the distinction of earning the highest mark in every class every year.

== Wartime service ==
Immediately after graduation, Worsley enlisted in the Women's Royal Canadian Naval Service, better known as the "Wrens". After basic training at HMCS Conestoga (Note: Canadian Navy bases are assigned ship-like names.) in Galt (today known as Cambridge, Ontario), she was assigned to the Naval Research Establishment (NRE) in Halifax. She was first tasked with studying harbour defences, then degaussing, and torpedo guidance.

When World War II ended, Worsley was the only Wren at the NRE to choose to remain in service. In September 1945, she was promoted to lieutenant and put on a new research project on hull corrosion. Over the next year, she spent 150 days at sea, many of them on the NRE's Bangor-class minesweeper, HMCS Quinte, setting a record for Wrens that stands to this day. Most of this took place during the terrible conditions of the Canadian Atlantic winter, earning her the respect of the crew doing what she herself referred to as a "man's job". She was officially demobilized in August 1946.

== Post-graduate at MIT ==
Immediately after leaving the Wrens, Worsley was accepted to MIT's one-year master's program in mathematics and physics. Among her classes was a course in solid-state physics taught by László Tisza, and a course on feedback amplifiers and servomechanisms, an area in which MIT was a world leader.

Her thesis on A Mathematical Survey of Computing Devices with an Appendix on Error Analysis of Differential Analyzers was completed under the direction of Henry Wallman, a member of the famed MIT Radiation Laboratory. The paper covered almost every computing machine then in existence. Among the many machines discussed were the Harvard Mark I and Mark II, several IBM mechanical and electromechanical calculating machines, Bell Labs' relay based digital computers, ENIAC, EDVAC, the IAS machine, Whirlwind I and II, and EDSAC. The appendix covered a number of differential analyzer systems and examined their sources of errors. It remains one of the most detailed accounts of early computing.

== Computation Centre in Toronto ==
After writing her thesis, Worsley returned to Canada and told her family that the future was in computers. Unfortunately, there was no computing industry in Canada at that time, and she took a job with the National Research Council of Canada (NRC), where she worked in the aerodynamics department.

Through this period, the University of Toronto had been setting plans to open a computing department, both as a research facility at the university and as a service bureau, selling time on the machines to commercial and government users. In September 1947, the first funds were provided by the NRC to purchase two IBM punch card mechanical calculators and two assistants to run them. Worsley heard of the effort and applied to the position, having been at the NRC for only a few months. She joined the new department in January 1948.

One of her first jobs at the centre was a contract with Atomic Energy of Canada (AECL) to provide computational support, along with staff advisor Kelly Gotlieb and J. Perham Stanley, another assistant hired at the same time as Worsley. During the summer of 1948, she built a differential analyzer from Meccano parts, similar to the one described by Hartree and Arthur Porter in 1935. Little information on this analyzer survives; a second model, or perhaps a rebuild of the original, was built by students in 1951.

== Cambridge ==
With the analyzer completed, Worsley and Stanley were sent to the UK to learn what they could of the EDSAC design, then under construction at Cambridge University's Cambridge Mathematical Laboratory. They arrived to find the machine nearly completed, and helped where they could to bring it online for its first test run on 6 May 1949. The first program to run successfully on the machine was one Worsley helped write for calculating squares, and she later collected this and a number of similar programs into one of the earliest papers on the topic, The E.D.S.A.C. Demonstration.

The next month, a meeting was held at Cambridge on the topic of computing machines, and Worsley prepared a report on the program that produced squares, and a new one that produced tables of prime numbers. The report included sample output, as well as a description of the code and how it was run on the machine. This was printed in the conference proceedings, and was picked up years later by Brian Randell for his 1973 book, The Origins of Digital Computers. This made Worsley well-known in the computing field long after the events.

Worsley then began her PhD at Newnham College. While working at the Lab, she attended courses on quantum physics with Paul Dirac, John Lennard-Jones and Nicholas Kemmer, number theory with Albert Ingham, and perhaps most importantly, numerical analysis with Douglas Hartree. She began writing her dissertation under Hartree, who coincidentally also supervised another Canadian woman, Charlotte Fischer.

In the midst of this work, for unknown reasons, Worsley returned to Toronto and continued her dissertation under U of T maths professor Byron Griffith. Shortly thereafter, she was rehired by the Computation Centre in July 1951. Hartree approved the dissertation and Worsley received her doctorate in 1952.

Her paper, Serial Programming for Real and Idealized Digital Calculating Machines, is considered to be the first PhD dissertation written about modern computers. It included a number of discussions about numerical calculations on Turing machines as well as real-world examples, notably EDSAC. It then went on to describe methods for recognizing which machine instructions were required, and which could be accomplished by combinations of other instructions. Both Turing and Claude Shannon had discussed idealized versions of this concept, but Worsley's contribution was to demonstrate the most efficient way to do this, not a single generalized solution as in Shannon's case.

== FERUT and Transcode ==
During the summer of 1948, the Computing Centre approached the NRC with plans to build a copy of Bell Labs' Mark 6 relay-based digital computer. Given a tentative go-ahead, they approached Northern Electric to obtain blueprints for the design, and were told there would be a license fee of $25,000 (equivalent to $347,881 in 2025). They returned to the NRC in March 1949 for an additional $50,000 for the license and construction costs, but the NRC wisely told them to drop these plans and build an electronic version instead.

Together, the university and NRC planned an ambitious program to build a first-rate computer to be used by NRC, the Defense Research Board, and industry. Known as UTEC, construction began in 1951 but quickly ran into serious problems due to the unreliability of their Williams tube memory systems. It was not until late that year that the system was finally reliable enough to be used. At this point, the Centre approached the NRC for funding to complete the system with a parallel math unit.

AECL had been growing increasingly frustrated with the lack of a usable machine, and when they heard NRC had been approached to continue UTEC development, they suggested the funds would be better spent buying a complete machine. Bennett Lewis of AECL was aware that Ferranti had built a complete Ferranti Mark 1 machine for AECL's counterpart in the UK, the United Kingdom Atomic Energy Authority, only to be left holding it when the incoming government cancelled its funding. This was available for only $30,000 (equivalent to $356,957 in 2025), about the same as the first round of funding required for the expanded UTEC.

The machine was purchased in early 1952 and arrived in early 1952, before Worsley rejoined the centre. She was aware of the machine's arrival and christened it FERUT for "Ferranti Electronic computer at the University of Toronto". The machine was operational by the summer, providing U of T with one of the most powerful computers in the world.

In the fall of 1953, Worsley and Patterson Hume began development of a new computer language for the machine, known as Transcode. This was similar to Autocode being developed by Alick Glennie at the University of Manchester for the same machine, but took advantage of several design notes of the Mark I to produce a faster and somewhat easier to use language. One major advantage was the conversion from decimal to binary and back, which allowed programmers to enter numbers in decimal form.

== Queen's University ==
In spite of impressive credentials from Cambridge, a series of well-respected papers, and several firsts in the industry, Worsley was repeatedly passed over for promotion within the University of Toronto. It was not until 1960 that she was promoted from a staff member to an assistant professor, and not until 1964 that she was promoted to assistant professor of physics and computer science. In comparison to the other members of the early days of the Computation Center, she received far less recognition.

In 1965, Worsley was offered a job at Queen's University, launching their new Computer Centre based on an IBM 1620. (Note: The 1620 was replaced by an IBM 360/40 in 1967.) At Queen's her duties turned more to teaching, and took up most of her time by 1971. In September of that year, after 20 years in the field, she took a sabbatical at the Department of Applied Analysis and Computer Science at the University of Waterloo. On 8 May 1972, in Waterloo, Worsley suffered a fatal heart attack.

== Awards ==
In 2014, Worsley was posthumously awarded the Lifetime Achievement Award in Computer Science by the Canadian Association of Computer Science.
