= Stephen Blundell =

British physicist

- Born: Stephen John Blundell; 1967 (age 58–59)
- Education: University of Cambridge (BA, PhD)
- Spouse: Katherine Blundell
- Awards: Daiwa Adrian Prize
- Scientific career
- Fields: Physics
- Workplaces: University of Oxford
- Thesis: Spin-dependent transport in artificial structures (1993)
- Website: users.ox.ac.uk/~sjb

Stephen John Blundell (born 1967) is a professor of physics at the University of Oxford. He was previously head of Condensed Matter Physics at Oxford, and is also a professorial fellow of Mansfield College, Oxford. His research is concerned with using muon-spin rotation and magnetoresistance techniques to study a range of organic and inorganic materials, particularly those showing interesting magnetic, superconducting, or dynamical properties.

== Education ==
Blundell completed both his undergraduate and graduate studies at the University of Cambridge, attending Peterhouse, Cambridge for his undergraduate degree in physics and theoretical physics and doing his PhD at the Cavendish Laboratory at Cambridge.

== Career and research ==
He was subsequently offered a Science and Engineering Research Council (SERC) research fellowship which involved a move to the Clarendon Laboratory at Oxford; he was later awarded a junior research fellowship at Merton College, Oxford, where he began research in organic magnets and superconductors using muon-spin rotation. In 1997 he was appointed to a university lectureship in the Oxford Physics Department and a tutorial fellowship at Mansfield College, Oxford, and was subsequently promoted to Reader. In 2004 he was awarded the title of Professor of Physics.

Blundell has authored textbooks, the first being Magnetism in Condensed Matter, which covers the quantum mechanical nature of magnetism. He has co-authored, with his wife and colleague, astrophysicist Katherine Blundell of St John's College, Oxford, a textbook entitled Concepts in Thermal Physics. It provides an introduction to the topics of thermal physics and statistical mechanics covered in a typical undergraduate course in physics. Additionally, he has authored the Superconductivity: A Very Short Introduction, part of the Very Short Introductions series published by Oxford University Press. He has co-authored pedagogical books on both quantum field theory and general relativity with Tom Lancaster.

He has authored or co-authored over 300 articles ranging right across the world of solid-state physics.

=== Awards and honours ===
Blundell was a joint winner of the Daiwa Adrian Prize in 1999 for his work on organic magnets. He was awarded the 2024 Lawrence Bragg Medal and Prize "for contributions to physics scholarship and education through the publication of widely used and influential physics textbooks".

== Personal life ==
Blundell lives in Oxford with his wife, Professor Katherine Blundell. In 2001, he was quoted in Science as saying, "Ultimately your marriage is more important than your career."
