= Francis Lee Friedman =

American physicist

- Born: September 5, 1918; New York City, New York
- Died: August 4, 1962 (aged 43); Boston, Massachusetts
- Education: Harvard University; Massachusetts Institute of Technology
- Awards: Oersted Medal of the American Association of Physics Teachers
- Scientific career
- Workplaces: Manhattan Project; Massachusetts Institute of Technology

Francis Lee Friedman (September 5, 1918 – August 4, 1962) was a professor of physics at the Massachusetts Institute of Technology (MIT).

== Life ==
Born in New York City, Friedman received a BA from Harvard in 1939 and an MA also from Harvard in 1940. In 1941 he was a graduate assistant at the University of Wisconsin.

After working as an assistant physicist at the National Bureau of Standards he joined the Metallurgical Laboratory at the University of Chicago (a division of the Manhattan Project) in 1942, first as an assistant to Gregory Breit, where he helped in estimating the thickness of the concrete shield surrounding a high-power nuclear reactor. Then, he became a member of the theoretical group led by Eugene Wigner. He was a signatory of the Szilárd petition in July 1945.

Friedman earned a Ph.D. from MIT in 1949 and became a professor of physics at MIT in 1950. There, he researched nuclear physics, theoretical physics, and cosmic ray theory.

During the 1955–1956 academic year, Friedman worked in the Niels Bohr Laboratory at the Institute for Theoretical Physics in Copenhagen.

With Jerrold Zacharias led the Physical Science Study Committee (PSSC) with the aim to develop a new curriculum for high school physics. Friedman was the principal author of the first edition of the PSSC Physics textbook (1960).

Friedman became the director of the Science Teaching Center at MIT in 1960. A member of the American Physical Society and a fellow of the American Academy of Arts and Sciences, he died of cancer in Boston in 1962.

Burton Richter, a Nobel Prize-winning physicist, was one of his students.

== Bibliography ==
- Friedman, Francis L. (1948) Nuclear Reactors: Some Basic Considerations. Cambridge, Massachusetts: Laboratory for Nuclear Science and Engineering, Massachusetts Institute of Technology.
- Friedman, Francis L. (1949) Cosmic Ray Shower Theory. Cambridge, Massachusetts: Laboratory for Nuclear Science and Engineering, Massachusetts Institute of Technology.
- Friedman, Francis L.; Physical Science Study Committee.; et al (1960) PSSC physics: teacher's resource book and guide. D.C. Heath.
- Friedman, Francis L. and Leo Sartori. (1965) The Classical Atom. Addison Wesley, Reading, Mass.
