= Lisa Jardine-Wright =

British physicist and educator

Lisa Jardine-Wright OBE
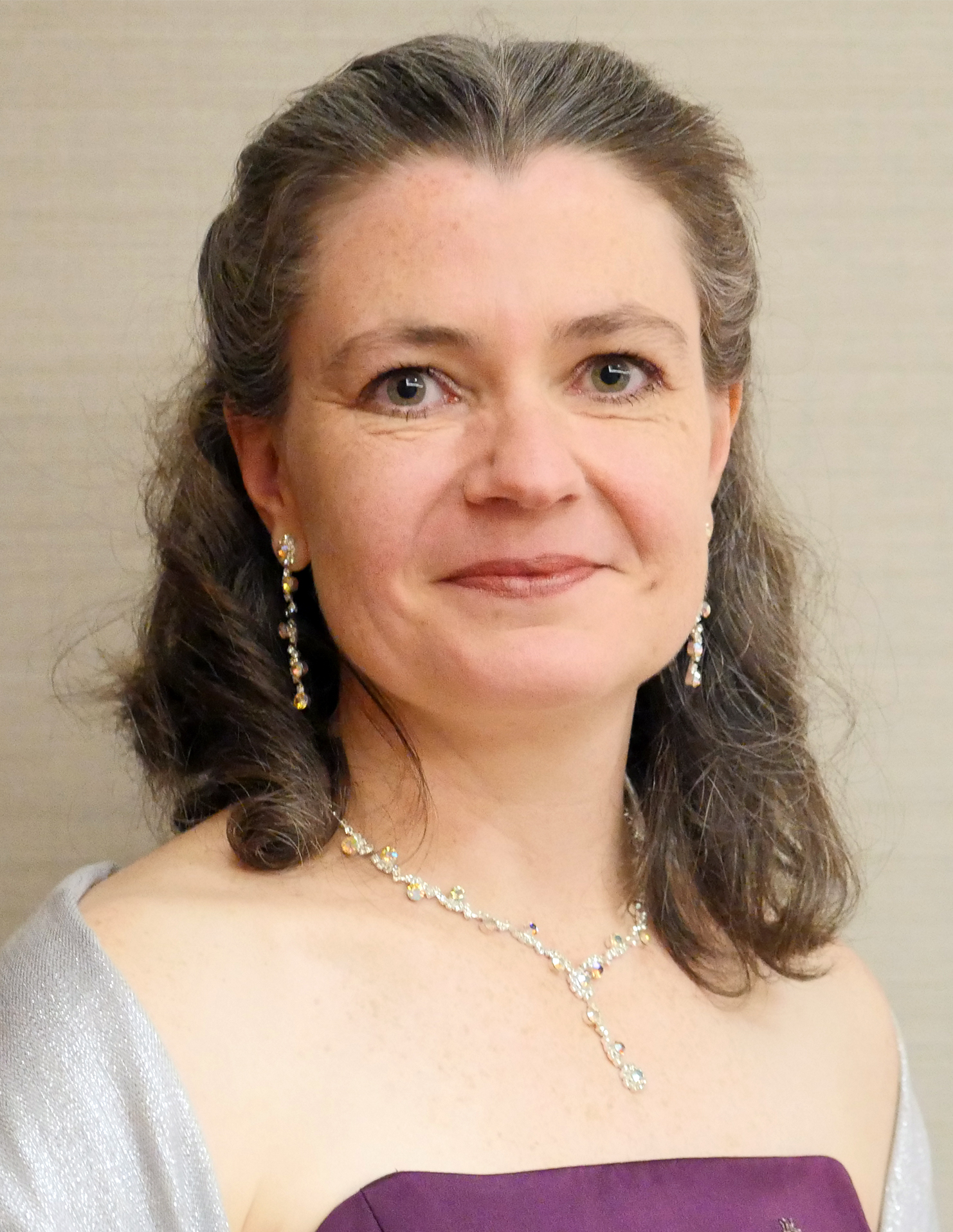
- Jardine-Wright at the Institute of Physics Awards, 2019
- Education: University of Cambridge
- Awards: IOP Phillips Award (2012), Lawrence Bragg Medal (2019)
- Scientific career
- Workplaces: University of Cambridge
- Website: Lisa Jardine-Wright at Issac Physics

Lisa Jayne Jardine-Wright OBE (born 1976) is an English physicist and educator at the University of Cambridge. She is the director of Isaac Physics, a Department for Education and the Ogden Trust supported open platform for active learning, which supports school students learning physics.

== Education and early career ==
Jardine-Wright attended a state-funded school in the North West of England. She studied physics at the University of Cambridge. She earned her master's degree at Trinity College, Cambridge, before studying towards a doctorate with George Efstathiou. Jardine-Wright worked on simulating the cosmological formation of spiral galaxies at the Institute of Astronomy, Cambridge. During her PhD she became interested in outreach and public engagement, and organised a series of open days and public lectures. She worked as a postdoctoral researcher on the formation of galaxies. During her postdoc, Jardine-Wright partnered with the Cambridge Astronomy Association to lead a series of stargazing evenings.

== Career ==
Jardine-Wright has worked in science communication and outreach. She was a British Science Association media fellow at the Financial Times, and started to write for the Times Higher Education as well as for the journal Science. She has also acted as a consultant for BBC News Magazine. During her postdoctoral research she also worked as the astronomy consultant for the Royal Observatory, Greenwich for the redesign of their astronomy galleries and planetarium (opened in 2007). Jardine-Wright is the educational outreach officer at the University of Cambridge, where she runs several programmes, including Physics at Work and the Senior Physics Challenge. She is a director of studies and undergraduate student tutor at Churchill College, Cambridge and served as acting senior tutor of the college during the spring and summer of the pandemic year 2020. She has investigated the performance of undergraduate students at the University of Cambridge, and the impact of gender and socioeconomic background. Despite all students being at the same academic level on entry to Cambridge, Jardine-Wright showed that women perform better with scaffolded as opposed to open questions.

=== Isaac Physics ===
Since founding Isaac Physics in 2014, Jardine-Wright has acted as Director and co-director. Isaac Physics is an online collection of physics questions from the archive of the Cambridge Assessment that looks to support school students studying physics. It originally began under the name of the Rutherford Schools Physics Partnership. Isaac Physics helps physics students prepare for the transition from school to university. Jardine-Wright is the author of an educational books for Isaac Physics. From 2013, the project has been supported by the Department for Education with additional support from The Ogden Trust. Isaac also supports students studying A-Level chemistry.

== Honours and awards ==
Jardine-Wright was appointed Officer of the Order of the British Empire (OBE) in the 2022 Birthday Honours for services to education.

- 2012 Institute of Physics Phillips Award
- 2015 Times Higher Education Outstanding Digital Innovation (shortlisted)
- 2017 University of Cambridge Pilkington Prize
- 2019 Institute of Physics Lawrence Bragg Medal and Prize
