= Donald Ivey =

Canadian educator (1922–2018)

Vice-President, Institutional Relations of the University of Toronto
- In office 1980 – 1984
- President: James Milton Ham; David Strangway

2nd Principal of New College, Toronto
- In office 1963 – 1974
- Preceded by: Frank Wetmore
- Succeeded by: Andrew Baine

Personal details
- Born: February 6, 1922 Clanwilliam, Manitoba, Canada
- Died: June 25, 2018 (aged 96) Toronto, Ontario, Canada
- Known for: Host of The Nature of Things and Frames of Reference
- Scientific career
- Education: University of British Columbia; University of Notre Dame
- Awards: Edison Award for Educational Video Series
- Workplaces: University of Toronto; Canadian Broadcasting Corporation

Donald G. Ivey (February 6, 1922 – June 25, 2018) was a Canadian professor of physics and television host who was the second principal of New College at the University of Toronto from 1963 to 1974.

== Career ==
After receiving his honours degree in math and physics from the University of British Columbia in 1944 and PhD from the University of Notre Dame in 1949, he joined the University of Toronto Faculty of Arts and Science's Department of Physics as an assistant professor, becoming a full professor in 1963.

In collaboration with his colleague Patterson Hume, Ivey helped to steer the teaching of physics in a new direction through the use of educational television programs and movies. Hume and Ivey prepared and presented over one hundred television programs for the Canadian Broadcasting Corporation on various physics topics. Short films such as Frames of Reference and the TV show The Nature of Things used humour and creative camerawork to make physics accessible to a wider range of students.

Ivey was the second principal of New College and the first vice-president of institutional relations at the University of Toronto. Upon his retirement, he was appointed Professor emeritus in 1987. He died on June 25, 2018.

He received numerous awards throughout his career, including the Award of Honour from the University of Notre Dame in 1965 and the Robert A. Millikan award from the American Association of Physics Teachers for "notable and creative contributions to the teaching of physics" in 1987. For the education work he carried out with Hume, an asteroid (number 22415) was named HumeIvey in their honour.

New College's library is named "Donald G. Ivey Library" in his honour.

== Sources ==
- Great Teachers from our Past University of Toronto
- On Beyond Darwin, Chapter 1
- Obituary
