= Physical Science Study Committee =

Committee with the objective to review and improve introductory physics education

The Physical Science Study Committee (PSSC) was inaugurated at a 1956 conference at MIT to review introductory physics education and to design, implement, and monitor improvements. It produced major new physics textbooks, instructional movies, and classroom laboratory materials, which were used by high schools around the world during the 1960s and 1970s and beyond.

== Original members ==
- Professor Jerrold Zacharias, (chairman)
- Professor Eric Rogers
- Professor Francis L. Friedman
- Professor George Gamow
- Professor Sanford C. Brown
- Professor Victor Weisskopf

== Development ==
In 1956, MIT professors Jerrold Zacharias and Francis Friedman organized a group of university and high school physics educators to reform the teaching of this fundamental science at the secondary level. There was concern that traditional teaching failed to convey a sense of excitement and inquiry, and a way of thinking about physics beyond rote memorization of equations. After the launch of Sputnik by the Soviet Union in 1957, the US National Science Foundation greatly increased funding, to radically improve the teaching of science in the country's response to Cold War rivalries. Eventually, several hundred physicists, high school teachers, apparatus designers, writers, and editors would become involved with the project.

There was a concern that traditional high school physics had devolved to a hodge-podge of Newtonian mechanics and other topics that was poorly integrated, with increasing emphasis on the peculiarities of current technology. In contrast, the PSSC approach emphasized the unity of physical inquiry, organized around broad principles such as the conservation laws, rather than a series of disparate equations to be memorized. Details of current technology would be deemphasized, and fewer topics would be covered, to highlight a deep understanding of fundamental principles and the spirit and culture of scientific investigation. Hands-on laboratory work was regarded as an integral part of the course, including open-ended explorations and discovery of new concepts, rather than simple verification of received knowledge.

Photographer Berenice Abbott and filmmaker Richard Leacock were recruited to make visual aids to understanding complex phenomena such as wave propagation, kinematics, and electrical charge. They brought an esthetic sense of visual beauty to illustrations of elegant physical concepts. More than 50 educational movies were made of physical phenomena, including some which were too expensive, dangerous, or infeasible to demonstrate directly in a classroom. Stroboscopic photos made with the assistance of MIT professor Doc Edgerton were used to illustrate Newton's laws of motion, including what would become an iconic image of a bouncing ball on the front cover of the textbook.

In 1960, the textbook and course materials were first published by D. C. Heath and Company (which became a division of Raytheon during 1966–1995), and a series of coordinating laboratory equipment and an experimental handbook was also released. The otherwise-unrelated Heathkit company marketed a series of its standard electronic instruments (e.g. oscilloscopes and signal generators), specially modified in some cases, to coordinate with the laboratory handbook. Another company marketed a small table-top water-filled tray which could project an image of wave phenomena, which became an influential educational aid used at both the high school and college levels. Doubleday published a "Science Studies Series" of over 50 small paperback books on related scientific subjects at a high school level, covering topics such as crystal growing, waves and beaches, subatomic particles, the universe, and biographies of notable scientists. The non-profit Educational Service Incorporated, which became Education Development Center, was created to continue the work of PSSC.

By the 1964–1965 school year, about half the US students enrolled in high school physics (200,000 students, 5000 teachers) were reportedly using the PSSC course materials. However, considerable resistance developed among some teachers to the disruption of traditional methods of teaching. Criticisms ranged from complaints about an informal tone in the text, deferring the use of technical terms, to an attempt to cover too many concepts at too deep an intellectual level for average students.

== Legacy ==
From the beginning, there was an interest in assessing student progress and the overall effectiveness of the new curriculum through a series of 10 tests, to be administered throughout the year.

== Books ==
- PSSC. Physics. 1st Edition 1960. D.C. Heath
- Judson B. Cross, John H. Dodge, James A. Walter, Uri Haber-Schaim. PSSC Physics. 3rd edition 1971. D.C. Heath
- Haber-Schaim, Uri; Dodge, John H.; Gardner, Robert; Shore, Edward A.; Walter, Felicie (1991). PSSC Physics (7th ed.). Dubuque, Iowa: Kendall/Hunt. ISBN 978-0840360250.

== Films ==
- Richard Leacock, director & producer, Eric M. Rogers, lecturer, "Coulomb's Law"
- Abraham Morochnik, Donald Ivey and Patterson Hume, Frames of Reference
- Elbert Little, Random Events
- John N. Shive, Simple Waves

== See also ==
- Harvard Project Physics – a later alternative approach to teaching physics at the high school level
- Biological Sciences Curriculum Study (BSCS) - a contemporaneous program to reform biology teaching at the high school level
- Berkeley Physics Course
