= Katherine Blundell =

British astrophysicist

Katherine Blundell OBE
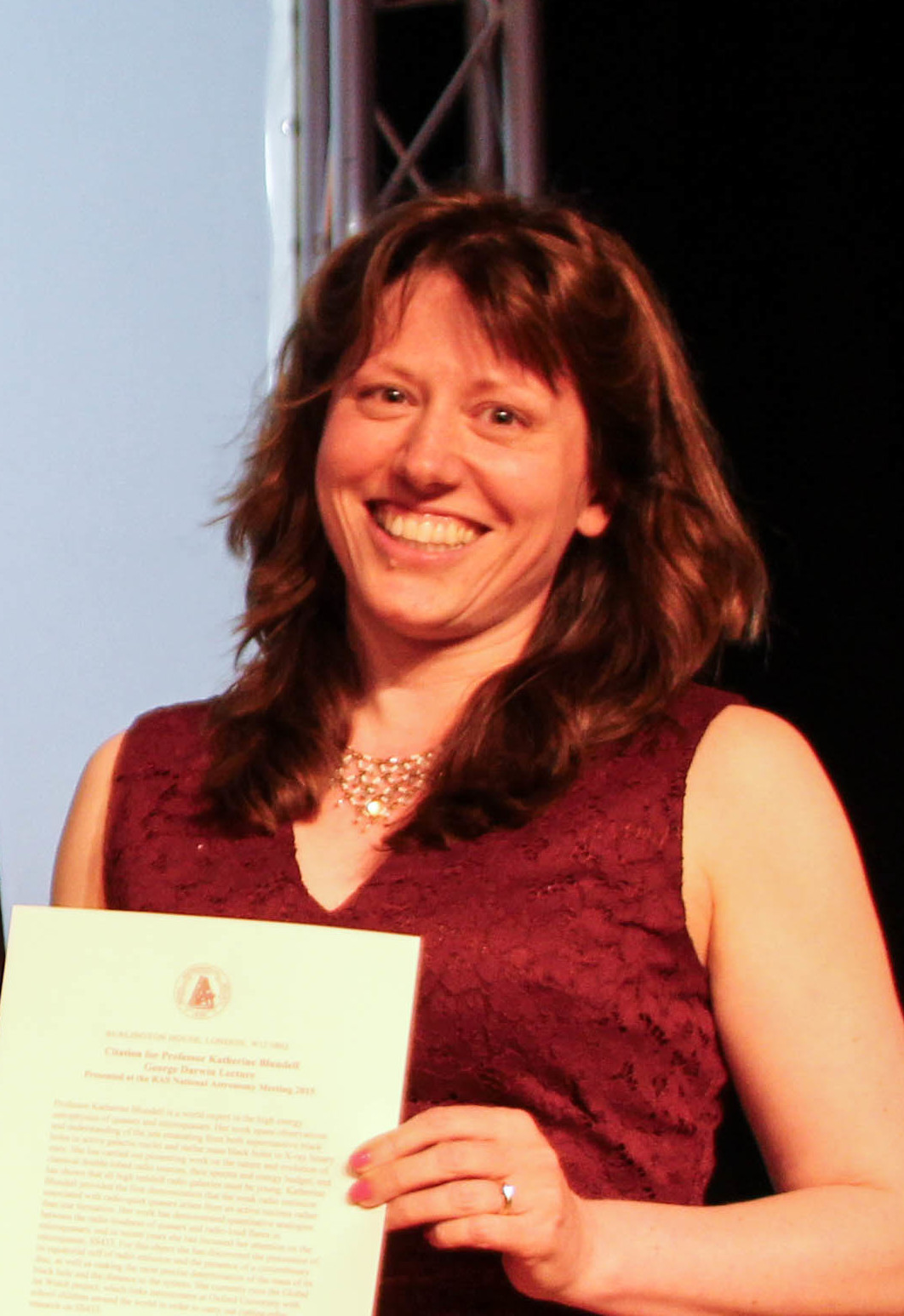
- Katherine Blundell in 2015
- Education: University of Cambridge (BA, PhD)
- Known for: Global Jet Watch
- Spouse: Stephen Blundell
- Awards: George Darwin Lectureship (2015); Lawrence Bragg Medal (2012); Rosalind Franklin Award (2010); Philip Leverhulme Prize (2005); Royal Society University Research Fellowship
- Scientific career
- Fields: Astrophysics; Black holes Microquasars
- Workplaces: University of Oxford
- Thesis: Asymmetries in radio galaxies and quasars (1995)
- Website: www2.physics.ox.ac.uk/contacts/people/blundell

Katherine Mary Blundell OBE is a professor of astrophysics at the University of Oxford and a supernumerary research fellow at St John's College, Oxford. Previously, she held a Royal Society University Research Fellowship, and fellowships from the Royal Commission for the Exhibition of 1851 and Balliol College, Oxford.

== Education ==
Blundell was educated at the University of Cambridge where she was awarded a Bachelor of Arts degree followed by a PhD in 1995 for research on radio galaxies and quasars.

== Research and career ==
Blundell's research investigates the physics of active galaxies – such as quasars. She also studies objects in the Milky Way such as microquasars which produce astrophysical jets of plasma that emit radio waves and move at speeds close to the speed of light.

Blundell is founder of the Global Jet Watch (GJW) project, which records spectroscopic measurements of microquasars such as SS 433. The project uses five Ritchey–Chrétien telescopes separated in longitude around the Earth so that at any time at least one of them is in night-time. Two of the telescopes are located in Australia (Western Australia and New South Wales), with one each in India, South Africa and Chile.

Blundell's work has been funded by the Science and Technology Facilities Council (STFC), the Royal Society and the Royal Commission for the Exhibition of 1851. Her collaborators have included Steven Balbus, Steven Rawlings, Roger Llewelyn Davies, Stephen Blundell and Fraser A. Armstrong.

Blundell is the author or co-author of several books, including Black Holes : A Very Short Introduction, Concepts in Thermal Physics and Energy... beyond Oil.

== Personal life ==
Blundell is married to Stephen Blundell.

== Honours and awards ==
Blundell was appointed Order of the British Empire (OBE) in the 2017 Birthday Honours for services to astronomy and the education of young people. She was awarded the Philip Leverhulme Prize in Astrophysics in 2005, the Rosalind Franklin Award from the Royal Society in 2010, the Lawrence Bragg Medal and Prize from the Institute of Physics (IOP) in 2012 and the George Darwin Lectureship from the Royal Astronomical Society (RAS) in 2015. In 2026, the main belt asteroid 1995 XC was named (31006) Katherine after her.
