= Fellow of the Institute of Physics =

Award granted by the IoP

- Sponsored by: Institute of Physics
- Location: London
- Website: membership.iop.org/fellow-finstp

Fellowship of the Institute of Physics (FInstP) is "the highest level of membership attainable" by physicists who are members of the Institute of Physics (IOP), "for those with a degree in physics or related subject (or equivalent knowledge gained in the workplace) and who have made a significant impact on their sector"; it is for "distinguished physicists in recognition of their accomplishments".

Honorary Fellowship (HonFInstP) is for "exceptional individuals" who can be nominated in recognition of having "contributed to physics generally or to the work of the IOP", working in fields including business, education, research, and policy relating to physics. The Institute's bye-laws limit the number of fellows in this category to being not more than 100 living Honorary Fellows at any one time.

== Fellows (FInstP) ==
Fellows are entitled to use the post-nominal letters FInstP, and receive a number of minor benefits such as a subscription to Physics World magazine (like other members of the IOP). As of 2022 fellows include:

- Antony Hewish,
- Ronald Hugh Barker (elected 1962 March, 6)
- Peter Higgs (elected in 1991),
- Jocelyn Bell Burnell (elected in 1989),
- Lorna Arnold
- James Gimzewski,
- Eleanor Campbell,
- Julia King, Baroness Brown of Cambridge,
- Richard Harrison,
- John Browne, Baron Browne of Madingley,
- David King (chemist),
- Andrew Peter Mackenzie,
- Uschi Steigenberger,
- Duncan Haldane,
- David J. C. MacKay,
- Colin R. McInnes,
- Myles Allen,
- Jim Al-Khalili (elected 2000),
- James Binney,
- Peter Wells,
- Steven Cowley,
- Heather Couper, and
- Philip Campbell,
- Ian Chapman.
- Lynn Kamerlin,
- Muhammad Usman
- Ling-An Wu

See also Category:Fellows of the Institute of Physics

== Honorary Fellows (HonFInstP) ==
The designation of Honorary Fellow of the Institute of Physics, as an honorary title. The award of Honorary Fellowship is "the highest accolade presented by the Institute of Physics to reflect an individual's exceptional services to physics". Awardees are entitled to use the post-nominal letters HonFInstP. No more than 100 living Honorary Fellows are permitted to be elected at any one time under the IOP's byelaws.

Recipients have included:

- Jim Al-Khalili
- Philip W. Anderson
- Sir Eric Ash
- Dame Jocelyn Bell Burnell
- Sir Michael Berry
- Paul Black
- Alexander Bradshaw
- Michael Cates
- Steven Chu
- Christine Davies
- Philip Diamond
- Masao Doi
- Dame Athene Donald
- John Ellis
- Brian Foster
- Sir Richard Friend
- Gillian Gehring
- Sir Andre Geim
- Fabiola Gianotti
- Michael Green
- Hermann Hauser
- Dame Julia Higgins
- Peter Higgs
- Cyril Hilsum
- Archie Howie
- Dame Sue Ion
- Dame Carole Jordan
- Peter I. P. Kalmus
- Klaus von Klitzing
- Sir Peter Knight
- Sir Anthony J. Leggett
- Martin Rees, Baron Rees of Ludlow
- Brian MacCraith
- Sir Konstantin Novoselov
- Jon Ogborn
- Sir Peter Ogden
- Becky Parker
- Sir John Pendry
- Sir Roger Penrose
- Sir Michael Pepper
- Lisa Randall
- C. N. R. Rao
- Peter Raynes
- Sheila Rowan
- David Sainsbury, Baron Sainsbury of Turville
- Sir Roy Sambles
- Dame Frances Saunders
- Tony Scott
- Wilson Sibbett
- Dame Julia Slingo
- Sir Chris Llewellyn Smith
- Donna Strickland
- Neil Turok
- William Frank Vinen
- Sir Peter Williams
- Sir Robin Williams
