= Schools Council =

School examinations body in England and Wales

The Schools Council was from 1964 to 1984 the body which co-ordinated secondary school examinations in England and Wales, and advised the government on matters to do with such examinations. It succeeded the Secondary Schools Examinations Council and the Curriculum Study Group. Its first chair was Sir John Maud.

== History ==
The Secondary Schools Examinations Council (SSEC) was established in 1917 and was succeeded by the Schools Council in 1963. It existed to provide external examinations for secondary schools as recommended by a Consultative Committee reporting to the Board of Education in 1917, these being the School Certificate and Higher School Certificate. The SSEC had "the duty of co-ordinating examinations and of negotiating with professional bodies for the acceptance of Certificates", with Universities acting as responsible bodies for conducting any of the examinations.

In 1978, Dr. Kevin Keohane of the new Schools Council was selected to set up a study group by the then Secretary of State for Education, to look into the proposals for a Certificate of Extended Education that had been proposed by the Schools Council. The resulting report became known as the Keohane Report (officially called Proposals for a Certificate of Extended Education) recommendations were rejected by the then Department for Education and Science.

In 1982 an independent review body advised the government that "the Schools Council should continue with its present functions and should not be made the subject of further external review for at least five years", and the government announced its abolition. The Schools Council ceased to exist on 31 March 1984 and it was replaced by the Secondary Examinations Council (SEC) and the School Curriculum Development Committee (SCDC).
