= Nuffield Foundation =

British charitable trust

The Nuffield Foundation is a charitable trust established in 1943 by William Morris, Lord Nuffield, the founder of Morris Motors Ltd. It aims to improve social well-being by funding research and innovation projects in education and social policy, and building research capacity in science and social science. Its current chief executive is Gavin Kelly.

The Foundation's income comes from the interest on its investments and it spends about £10 million on charitable activities each year. It is financially and politically independent and is governed by a board of trustees who meet four times a year.

The Foundation makes grants for research and innovation projects that aim to improve the design and operation of social policy, particularly in:

- Education
- Welfare
- Justice

It has discontinued its Open Door programme, but remains committed to encouraging original and thought-provoking approaches to research that identify new questions and change the terms of the debate.

The Foundation also funds programmes designed to increase research capacity in science and social science. Each year it funds over 1,000 Nuffield Research Placements to give hands on research experience to 16- and 17-year-olds studying STEM subjects.

With the ESRC and HEFCE it funds Q-Step, a £19.5 million programme designed to promote a step-change in quantitative methods training for social science undergraduates in the UK.

The Foundation has contributed to healthcare and medical research. It has a separate fund for investing in rheumatic disease research. This was bequeathed by Captain Oliver Bird in 1948. Over the next 10 years the Oliver Bird Fund will dedicate up to £12.5m on research into musculoskeletal (MSK) conditions. It also has a small dedicated fund for strengthening relationships between the UK and other Commonwealth countries.

== Selected grants ==
In 1951, the trust deed was amended to include "the advancement of education" as an objective of the foundation. This led to the Nuffield Science Teaching Project in the 1960s.

In 1960, the Foundation made a multi-year grant to Paintings in Hospitals for the purchase of paintings, and occasionally sculpture, in order to establish a permanent art collection for loan to hospitals in London.

In 2006, together with the Institute for Fiscal Studies the Nuffield Foundation funded a proposal for a revision of the British tax system. The research project was headed by Nobel laureate Sir James Mirrlees.

In 2015, the Nuffield Foundation funded Our World in Data, a free web-publication to share quantitative social science with the general public. This publication is used in teaching in many universities and in media coverage of the long-term perspective on global development.

In 2018, the Foundation established the Ada Lovelace Institute to research ethical questions raised by big data, algorithms and artificial intelligence.

In 2019, the Foundation launched a major review of inequalities chaired by Professor Sir Angus Deaton, and a £15m Strategic Fund for ambitious, interdisciplinary research projects that will address some of the most important challenges facing UK society and the public policy agenda in the next decade. Grants awarded through the Strategic Fund included:

- The Economy 2030 Inquiry: navigating a decade of change
- The skills imperative 2035: Essential skills for tomorrow's workforce
- The Future of Work and Well-being: The Pissarides Review
- Data and voice to improve children's lives

== See also ==
- Nuffield Council on Bioethics
