= Chelsea College of Science and Technology =

College in London, England (1890–1985)

Chelsea College
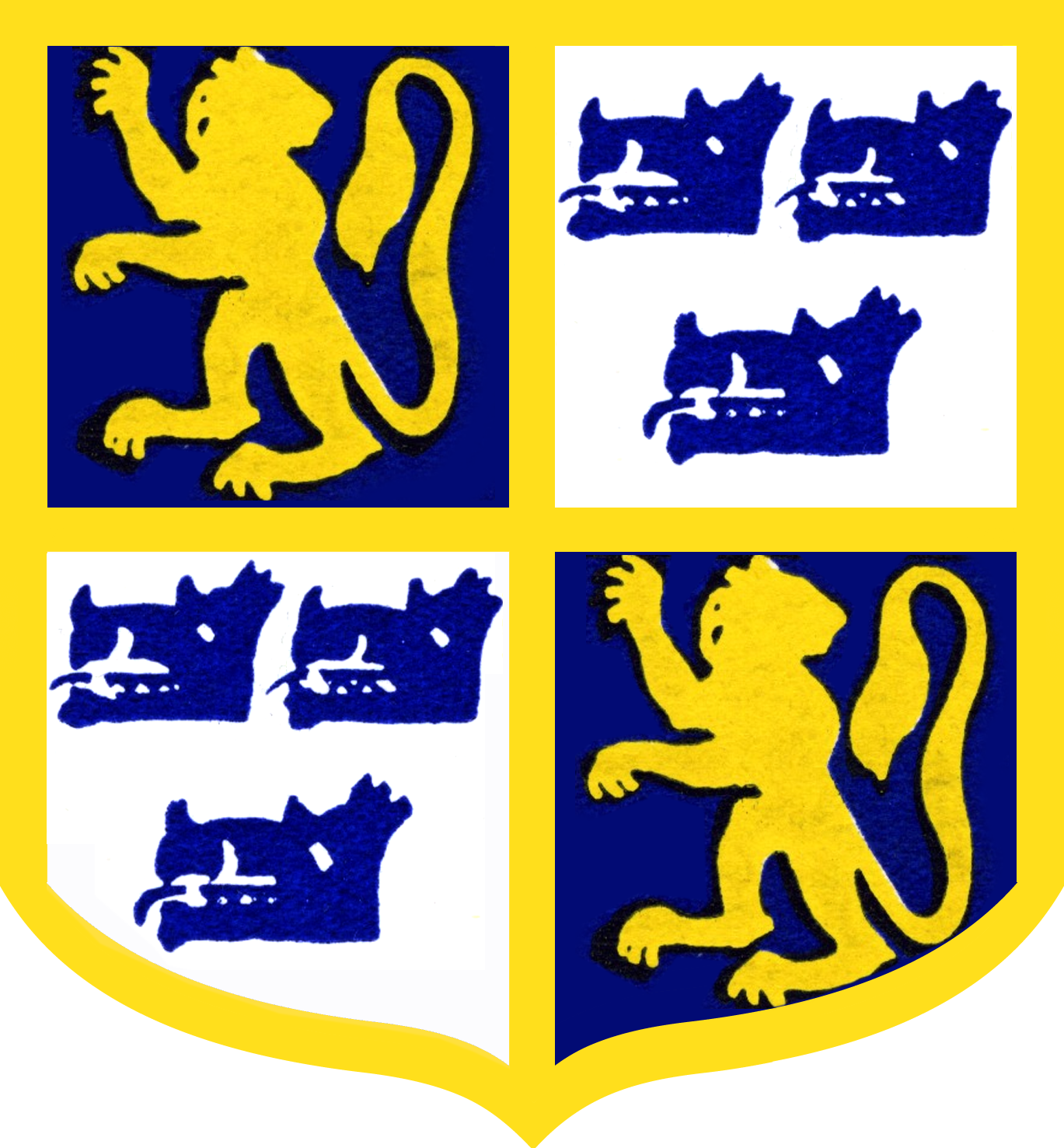
- Arms of Chelsea College
- Type: Public
- Active: 1890–1985
- Affiliations: King's College London, University of London
- Location: London, England
- Campus: Urban

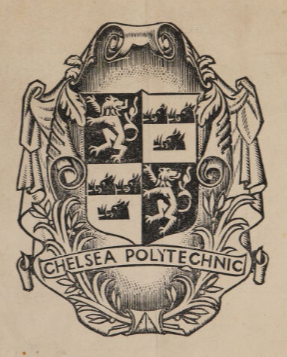
Coat of Arms of Chelsea Polytechnic

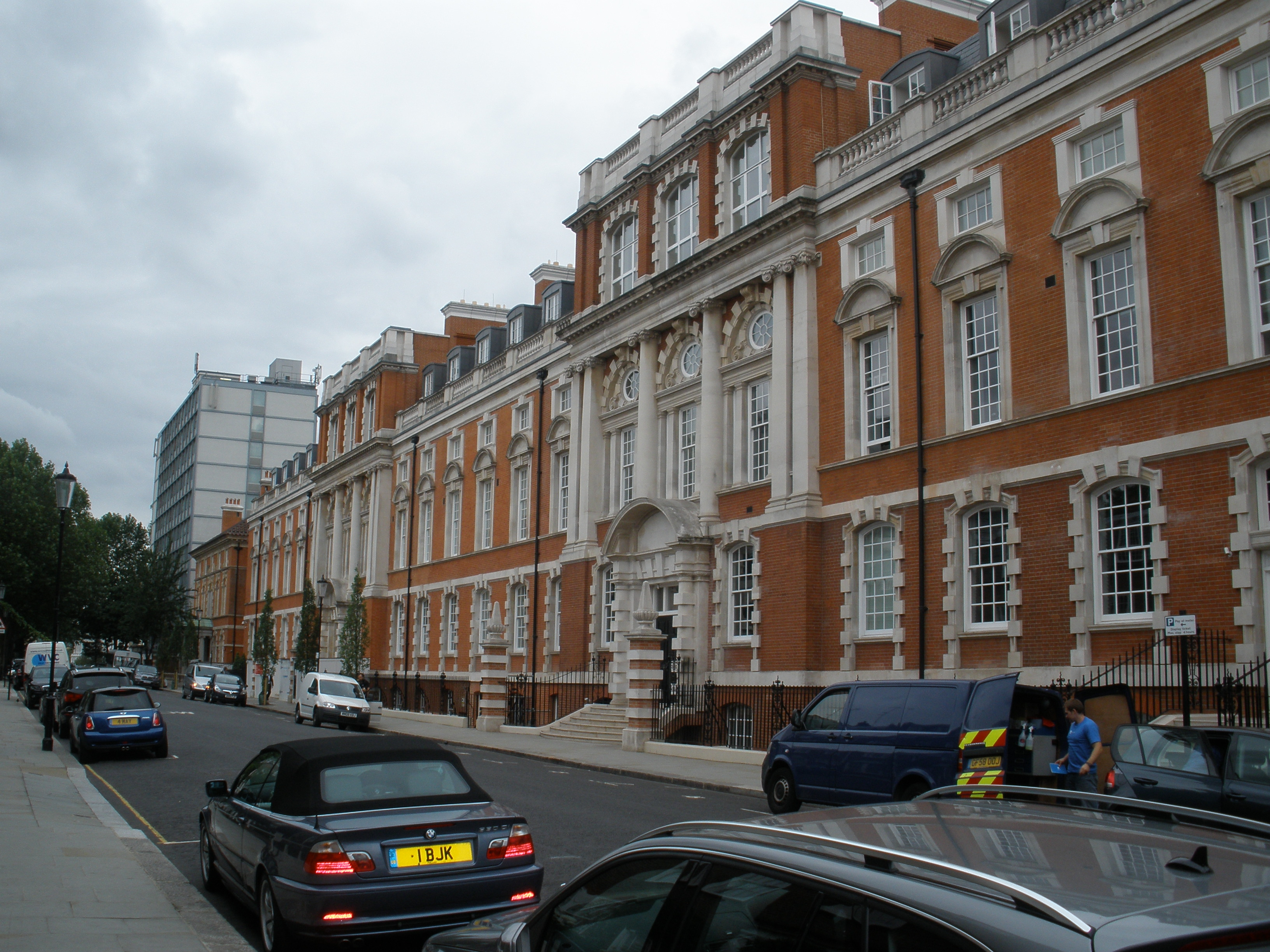
Main college building in Manresa Road

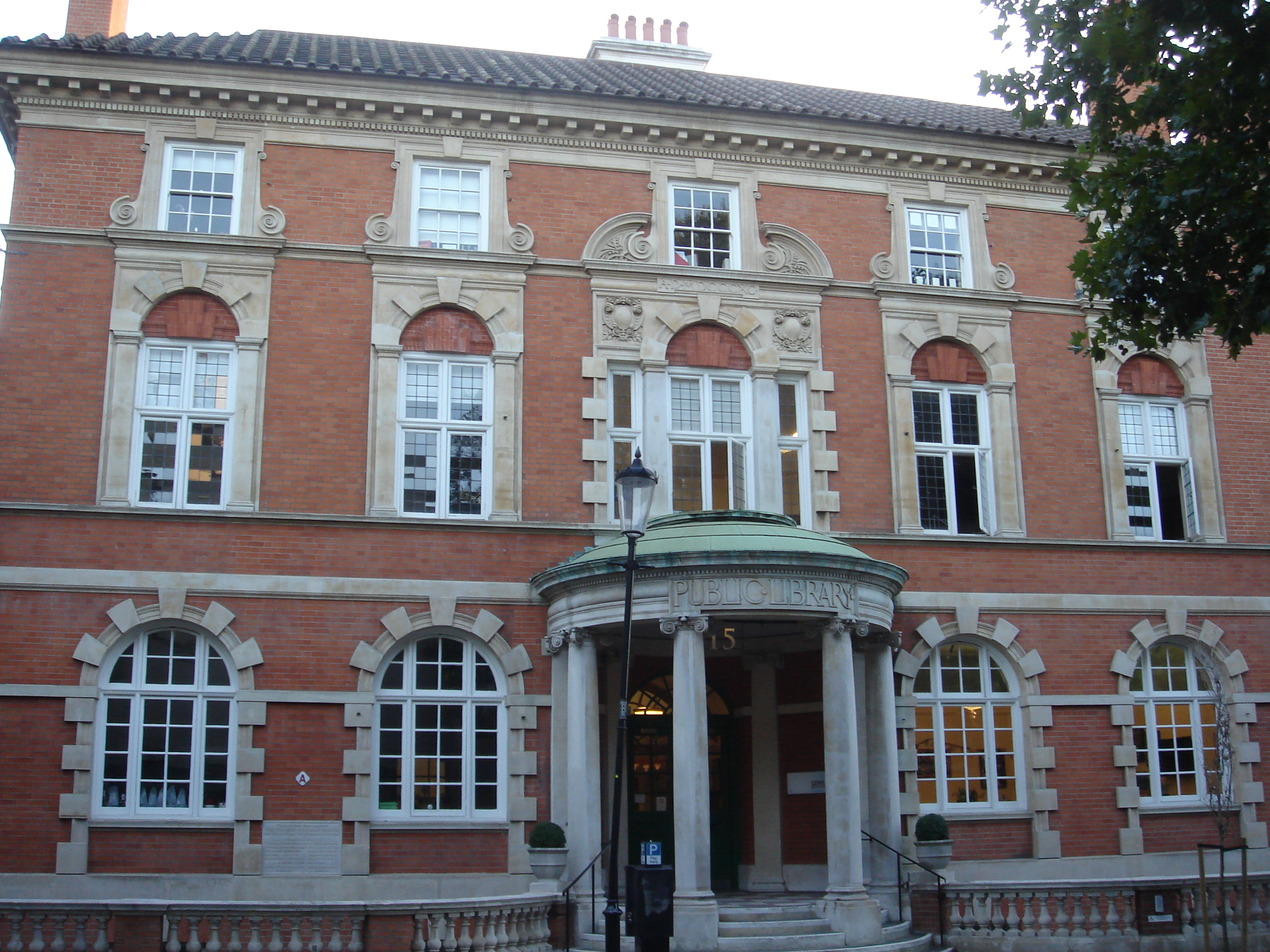
Chelsea Public Library, later part of Chelsea College

Chelsea College of Science and Technology was established as a College of Advanced Technology on a single site on the corner of Manresa Road and King's Road, Chelsea, London SW3, as part of the University of London in 1966. In 1969 it expanded into new premises on Hortensia Road Chelsea to house the Departments of Zoology and Botany and accommodate M.Sc. courses in applied biology. It was granted its royal charter in 1971 at which time it was renamed Chelsea College. The college took over the King's Road campus of The College of St Mark and St John when the latter moved to Plymouth in 1973. In 1985, it merged with King's College London.

== History ==
The site on Manresa Road had been earmarked for the college as early as 1890 and was opened as South West Polytechnic in 1895 and became the Chelsea Polytechnic in 1922. In 1957 the polytechnic became a college of advanced technology known as the Chelsea College of Advanced Technology (Chelsea CAT). This change to focus on the latter, required the CAT losing its renowned school of art and school of chiropody to other institutions. By 1965 Parliament was considering a move of the college to St Albans in Hertfordshire. The then Principal, Malcolm Gavin and the Professor of Science Education, Kevin Keohane were instrumental in the college becoming part of the University of London, and the creation of Britain's first Chair of Science Education..

The coat of arms of the polytechnic and subsequently the college were derived from those of historic Chelsea landowner Charles Cadogan.

It the mid 1970s the college incorporated the old Chelsea Public Library (Manresa Road), which is a Grade II* listed building. It was built in 1890, and the architect was J. M. Brydon. In 1985 the college and nearby Queen Elizabeth College merged with King's College London. The site in Chelsea was operational until 1996 as King's College London Chelsea Campus.

The main college building has since been converted into privately owned flats.. The former public library building is now a private school.
