= Icaroscope =

Telescope for seeing planes near the sun

An icaroscope is a telescope-like nonlinear optical device that enables viewing of both very bright and dark objects in the same image simultaneously. The problem the icaroscope was designed to solve was observing enemy aircraft approaching with the sun behind them, when the bright sun in a clear sky dazzles the observer and masks aircraft near the sun's disc. In the icaroscope, the scene is not viewed directly; instead it is briefly projected onto a screen coated with a special phosphor, and this screen is then shown to the viewer. The specific silver-activated zinc-cadmium sulphide phosphor has a short afterglow even in areas saturated by the full brightness of the sun. By rapidly exposing the phosphor, allowing it to decay for around 5 ms, and showing it to the viewer, the effect is to attenuate the brightness of the sun's disc by about 500 times, allowing details near it to be clearly seen. The icaroscope repeats this process at a rate of 90 Hz, permitting continuous observation.

Development of the icaroscope was carried out during the Second World War at the Institute of Optics by Brian O'Brien, Franz Urbach, and other researchers. The device is named for Icarus, the mythological figure known for flying too close to the sun.
