= Brian O'Brien (optical physicist) =

American optical physicist (1898-1992)

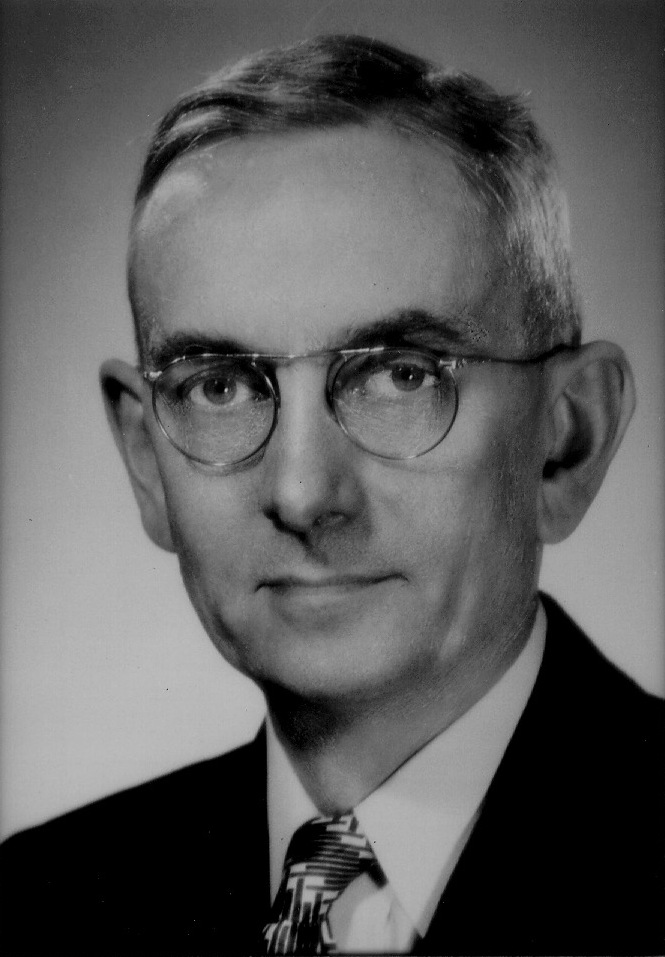
- Portrait of Brian O' Brien
- Born: January 2, 1898; Denver, Colorado
- Died: July 1, 1992 (aged 94); Woodstock, Connecticut
- Education: Yale University
- Known for: Night vision / Metascope, fiber optics, wide-film / screen projection
- Awards: The Medal of Merit
- Scientific career
- Workplaces: Westinghouse Electric Co; J.N. Adam Memorial hospital University of Rochester; Institute of optics Office of Scientific Research and Development; National Geographic; U.S. Army Air Corps

Brian O'Brien (January 2, 1898 – July 1, 1992) was an American optical physicist and the founder of the Air Force Studies Board (now part of the National Academy of Sciences), where he was the chairman for 12 years. Circa 1966, he "chaired an ad hoc committee under the USAF Science Advisory Board (AFSAB) looking into the UFO problem". He also had steering power over National Academy of Sciences (NAS) projects, Project Blue Book, and helped pave the way for the Condon Committee.

== Early years ==
O'Brien was born in Denver, Colorado in 1898 to Michael Phillip and Lina Prime O' Brien. He attended the Latin School of Chicago from 1909 to 1915, and continued at the Sheffield Scientific School of Yale University, where he earned a Ph.B. in electrical engineering in 1918 and a Ph.D. in physics in 1922. He also did course work at Massachusetts Institute of Technology and Harvard University.

In 1922 he married Ethel Cornelia Dickerman and they had one son, Brian, Jr. After Ethel Cornelia died, he married a second time to Mary Nelson Firth in 1956.

He was a research engineer at Westinghouse Electric Co. from 1922 to 1923. During this period he developed, along with Joseph Slepian, the auto-valve lightning arrester, which is still in use.

In 1923 he moved to J. N. Adam Memorial hospital in Perrysburg, New York, a tuberculosis sanitarium run by the city of Buffalo's public health department. Prior to the use of antibiotics, the primary treatment for tuberculosis was fresh air and light therapy. There was some evidence that sun tanning did help in the remission of the disease, but Perrysburg—40 miles south of Buffalo—had very little sunshine in the winter. Therefore, O'Brien, as a physicist on staff, developed a carbon arc with cored carbons that very closely matched the solar spectrum. With this development the patients could have sun therapy year-round. Due to a general interest in biological effects of solar radiation, he published some of the early work on the ozone layer and erythema caused by the sun.

O'Brien moved to the University of Rochester in 1930 to hold the chair of physiological optics. Shortly thereafter he became the director of the Institute of Optics. His continuing interest in the biological effects of solar radiation led to research in vitamin chemistry. The need for vitamin D, especially in the diet of children, had been recognized for preventing rickets. At that time there was no synthetic vitamin D, but the dehydrocholesterol in milk can be converted to vitamin D by radiation with ultraviolet light. The carbon arcs developed at Perrysburg were an ideal source of ultraviolet, but for proper irradiation, the milk had to be in a very thin film. ... A film of high enough flow volume for commercial application was produced, and vitamin D-fortified milk became widespread."

== War and peace: 1940 - 1953 ==
"By the end of 1940, The Institute of Optics was already involved with optical problems for government agencies; by the end of the academic year 1941-42, it was becoming more and more deeply involved." At the time the institute was dealing with a spike in number of students and attempted to tailor the curriculum for military usefulness. O' Brien's right-hand man was R.E. Hopkins, a young instructor with a B.S. from MIT who had just received his MS from the Institute of Optics, helping with lens design and geometrical optics.

The National Defense Research council became involved with the Institute December 1942 and continued the relationship until January 1946. They were looking for someone to make infrared-sensitive phosphors. Franz Urbach, an escaped Viennese expert, was working in the physics department and was quietly transferred to the Institute of Optics to help develop the "metascopes" for night vision; Urbach would later also work with O'Brien on the Icaroscope.

It was in relation to this work, in 1948, that Albert Noyes and O'Brien were awarded The Medal of Merit by President Harry S. Truman, the highest civilian award given by government.

In a report sent to President Valentine, O' Brien estimated that the Institute had "spent" about one million dollars for the war effort "including overhead allowances to the University." There was also a marked increase in undergraduate students during this time period. Recognizing his own personal research involvement O' Brien decided to no longer accept graduate students. The Institute emerged from the war a little brighter and a little less worse for wear. However the school still had a very small faculty, "only one full-time professor and a few junior faculty." Despite this limitation "five master's degrees and two Ph.D.s were awarded to students already enrolled."

In his '47 report, O'Brien pointed out the number of government and industry requests made for the Institute to conduct research. He enjoyed the projects, but recognized the research would get in the way of "quality teaching ... and that fair balance must be achieved." He decided he was much more interested "guiding research and advanced degree students than in the tiresome details of undergraduate instruction."

M. Parker Givens, a Cornell Ph.D, joined the Institute during this growth spurt. This permitted an increase in students. "Fourteen, he said, should be graduating, in 1948, and the total student enrollment was 53, about equally divided through the classes."

One of the hallmark innovations developed following the war was a camera with a six-inch f/1 lens for night aerial work, "giving excellent definition over a curved surface, the film being curved by compressed air between the lens and film." Another, first described at a meeting of the Society of Motion Picture Engineers in 1949, was a high-speed camera, "used for observations at the Bikini bomb test, later much improved to make rapid sequences of pictures at speeds up to 20 million frames per second."

== Honors and awards ==
O'Brien received numerous awards, including the Medal for Merit, the nation's highest civilian award, in 1946, for his work on optics in World War II and the Frederic Ives Medal in 1951. He was elected to both the American Philosophical Society and the American Academy of Arts and Sciences in 1953, and the United States National Academy of Sciences in 1954. He was a Fellow of the Optical Society of America, elected in the inaugural class in 1959.
