= Susan Houde-Walter =

American physicist

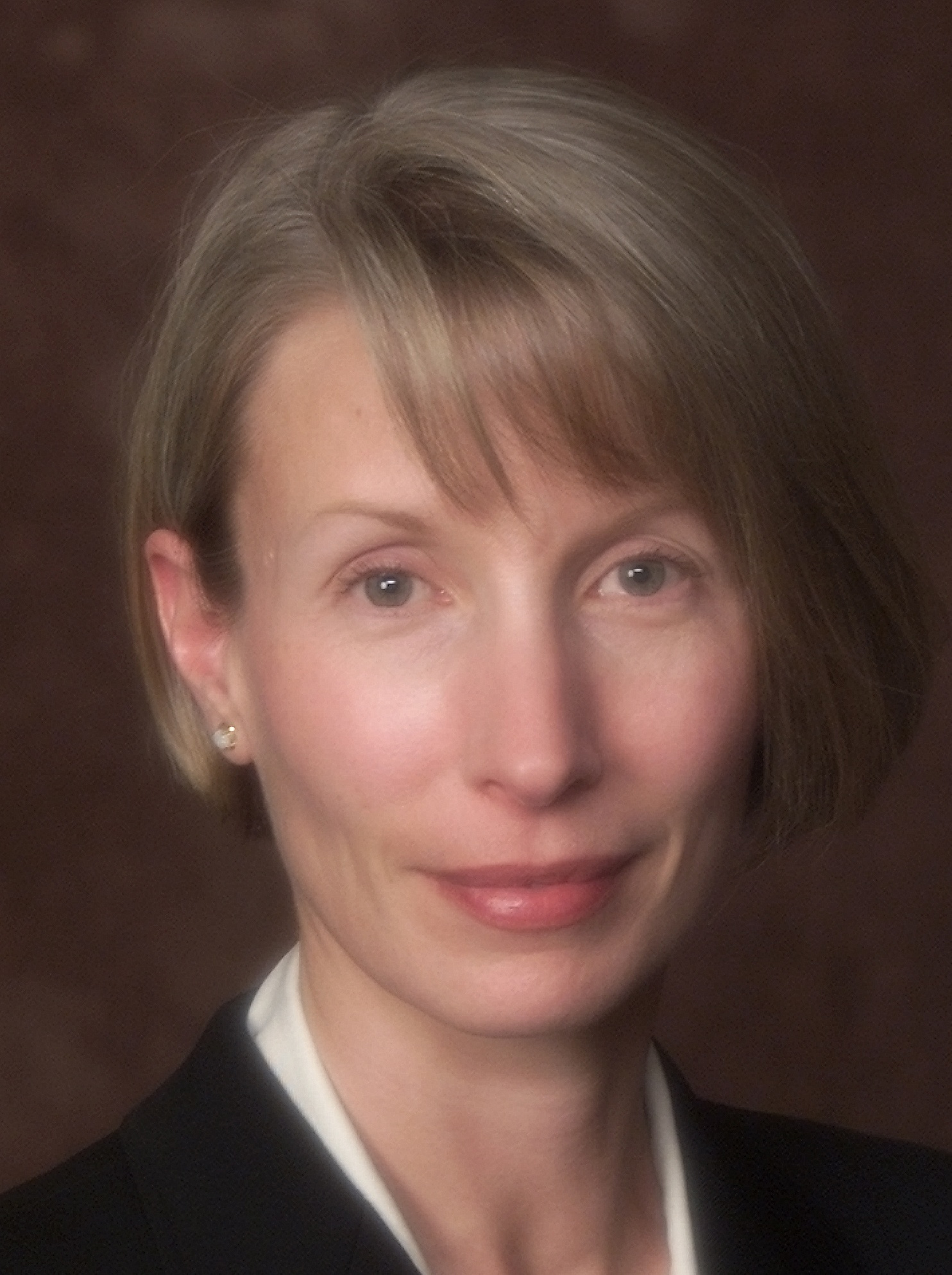
- Susan Houde-Walter
- Born: Susan Nicole Houde; 20 August 1954 (age 72); New York City, NY
- Education: Sarah Lawrence College (BA) University of Rochester (MS, PhD)
- Known for: Molecular Structure of Glass; Superlattice Disordering Optoelectronic Design; Quantum Cascade Laser
- Scientific career
- Fields: Physics; Optics; Lasers
- Workplaces: University of Rochester; Rochester Institute of Technology
- Doctoral advisor: Duncan Moore

Susan Nicole Houde-Walter (born 20 August 1954) is both an academic and executive with technical background in optical physics and engineering. Her specialties include laser physics, optoelectronics, optical materials, and imaging science, with applications in national security. She has traveled extensively with the United States military and served on science and policy boards, including the Army Science Board, the Department of the Air Force Scientific Advisory Board, the Intelligence Science and Technology Expert Group | National Academies, and the National Defense Industry Association board on Special Operations/Low Intensity Conflict.

Dr. Houde-Walter was elected to the Board of Directors and later to the presidential chain of Optica (formerly, OSA), serving as its president in 2005. The Pentagon selected her for the 71st Joint Civilian Orientation Conference (JCOC), held in the United States Central Command. She was awarded the Keeper of the Flame award in 2018 by the National Women's Hall of Fame.

== Early life and education ==
Houde-Walter was born as Susan Nicole Houde on 20 August 1954 in New York City, to Millicent (née Svoboda), a homemaker, and Raymond Houde, M.D., a pioneer in the management of chronic pain at the Memorial Sloan-Kettering Cancer Center. Susan was raised as graphic artist, and graduated from Sarah Lawrence College with a B.A. in liberal arts in 1976. She subsequently studied undergraduate physics at the Courant Institute of Mathematical Sciences at New York University, The Institute of Optics at the University of Rochester, and the Massachusetts Institute of Technology on an un-matriculated basis while working in New York City and Cambridge, Massachusetts. She was admitted to the masters and doctoral programs in optics at the University of Rochester in New York and produced both a master's and doctoral thesis in the area of gradient-index optics made by ion exchange in glass, thesis advisor Duncan T Moore.

== Career history ==
Houde-Walter served as Professor of Optics at the University of Rochester from 1987-2005. She was the first female regular faculty member for the first 80 years of the Institute of Optics’ history. She left the University of Rochester at rank of Full Professor of Optics (tenured) in 2005 and was appointed adjunct faculty at the, University of Arizona College of Optical Sciences that same year. Houde-Walter was elected to the Board of Directors and subsequently to the presidential chain of Optica (formerly Optical Society of America, OSA).

Houde-Walter and her husband Will co-founded LaserMax, Inc., a provider of laser optical equipment for civilian and law enforcement. Later, as CEO, she spun off LMD Power of Light, a manufacturer of advanced laser equipment including quantum cascade lasers for military and other government customers. Dr. Houde-Walter holds over twenty-five patents and has published widely in the fields of optoelectronics and optical materials. She served as the director and professor of the Chester F. Carlson Center for Imaging Science at the Rochester Institute of Technology from 2022 to 2023.

Houde-Walter held and currently holds positions on numerous science and policy boards for the United States Military and has traveled extensively in support. She was selected for the 71st Joint Civilian Orientation Conference in 2006, held in United States Central Command. She served on the Department of the Air Force Scientific Advisory Board, and multiple terms on the Army Science Board and Intelligence Science and Technology Experts Group. Houde-Walter also serves on the NDIA board on Special Operations/Low Intensity Conflict Division Board.

== Awards and recognitions ==
Houde-Walter is Fellow of both Optica (1996) and the American Ceramic Society (2000). She has been recognized for her service with the Public Service Commendation Medal, United States Department of the Army (2014) and the Commander’s Award for Public Service, United States Department of the Air Force (2016). In 2017, Dr. Houde-Walter was named the New York Photonics Entrepreneur of the Year. In 2018, the National Women’s Hall of Fame recognized Dr. Houde-Walter with the Keeper of the Flame Award. In 2020, Optica awarded Houde-Walter the Stephen D. Fantone Distinguished Service Award.

== See also ==
- Past Presidents of the Optical Society of America
