= Esther Hoffman Beller Medal =

Award given by The Optical Society

The Esther Beller Hoffman Medal is an award given by The Optical Society that recognizes outstanding contributions by individuals around the world to the fields of optical science and engineering education. The award was established in 1993 and past winners include Emil Wolf, Anthony E. Siegman, Ulrich Lemmer and Eric Mazur.

== Recipients ==
- 2026 Imrana Ashraf
- 2025 Peter E. Andersen and Stefan Andersson-Engels
- 2024 Anurag Sharma
- 2023 Harold Metcalf
- 2022 Julie L. Bentley
- 2021 Nicholas Massa
- 2020 Julio César Gutiérrez Vega
- 2019 Rick Trebino
- 2018 Ulrich Lemmer
- 2017 C. Martijn de Sterke
- 2016 Bishnu P. Pal
- 2015 Govind P. Agrawal
- 2014 Shin-Tson Wu
- 2013 Vasudevan Lakshminarayanan
- 2012 Judith F. Donnelly
- 2011 Stephen M. Pompea
- 2010 Eustace L. Dereniak
- 2009 Anthony E. Siegman
- 2008 Eric Mazur
- 2007 M. J. Soileau
- 2006 Sang Soo Lee
- 2005 Thomas K. Gaylord
- 2004 Janice A. Hudgings
- 2003 Ajoy K. Ghatak
- 2002 Emil Wolf
- 2001 Douglas S. Goodman
- 2000 Henry Stark
- 1999 Bahaa E. A. Saleh
- 1998 Amnon Yariv
- 1997 Hugh Angus Macleod
- 1996 Donald C. O'Shea
- 1995 Joseph W. Goodman
- 1993 Robert G. Greenler

== See also ==
- List of physics awards
