= Jannick =

Jannick is a given name. Notable people with the name include:

- Jannick Buyla (born 1998), professional footballer
- Jannick Green (born 1988), Danish professional handball player
- Jannick de Jong (born 1987), Dutch motorcycle racer
- Jannick Liburd (born 2001), American professional soccer player
- Jannick Lupescu (born 1993), Dutch tennis player
- Jannick Rolland, Professor of Optical Engineering, University of Rochester
- Jannick Schibany (born 1993), Austrian footballer
- Jannick Top, French bass player and composer
