= Anurag Sharma =

Anurag Sharma may refer to:

- Anurag Sharma (actor)
- Anurag Sharma (physicist)
- Anurag Sharma (politician)
