= Xi-Cheng Zhang =

Chinese-born American physicist

Xi-Cheng Zhang (Chinese: 张希成) is a Chinese-born American physicist, currently serving as the Parker Givens Chair of Optics at the University of Rochester, and the director of the Institute of Optics. He is also the chairman of the board and President of Zomega Terahertz Corporation.

Previously he was the J. Erik Jonsson '22 Professor of Science at Rensselaer Polytechnic Institute, where he had joint appointments in the Department of Physics, Applied Physics and Astronomy, and the Department of Electrical Computer, and System Engineering. He also served as the director of the Center for Terahertz Research.

== Biography ==
Zhang received his BS in physics from Peking University, China in 1982. He subsequently earned his M.Sc and PhD in physics from Brown University, RI, USA in 1983 and 1986 respectively. He was a research physicist in Amoco Research Center and research scientist in Columbia University. He was appointed as associate professor in the department of physics at Rensselaer Polytechnic Institute in Jan, 1992. He was promoted to Professor and Distinguished Professor in Science in May 1997 and Sep. 2001 respectively. He was elected as the Fellow of Institute of Electrical and Electronics Engineers ins 2001 for "contributions to free-space terahertz optoelectronics".

He has been involved in research using Terahertz radiation, a part of the spectrum between microwaves and infrared, and the traditional bounds of electronics, and photonics. Terahertz radiation, or "T-Rays" have many potential applications for 3D scanning, non-destructive testing, and spectroscopy. Dr. Zhang has been active in pulsed THz research since 1988. He edited the seminal text in the emerging field of THz liquid photonics: Terahertz Liquid Photonics, World Scientific (2023).

His major Professional Activities include: Editor-in-Chief and Executive Editor-in-Chief, Springer Nature Light, Science, & Applications ’20-26; Optica (former OSA) Leadership Nominating Council, ’19-21, Editor-in-Chief of Optics Letters ’14-19, Director-at-Large, OSA ’14-16, Associate Editor of Frontier of Optoelectronics ’13-14, Topical Editor of JOSA B ‘05-11, Associate Editor-in-Chief for Chinese Optics Letters, Chinese Academy of Science Assessor, ‘00-10; Member, CLEO ‘03, CLEO ‘02, CLEO ‘99, ‘00 Program Subcommittee on Ultrafast Optics and Electronics; Chair of Physics Panel, ’99, National Defense Science and Engineering Graduate Fellow Program; Board of Editorial Committee, ’99, Laser Society of Japan; Co-chair, ’99, Conference on THz Spectroscopy and Application, SPIE; chair, ’97, Ultrafast Optics & Electronics, LEOS Annual Meeting; Guest Editor, ’96, JSTQE on Ultrafast Electronics, Photonics and Optoelectronics; chair, ’95-’98, Committee on Ultrafast Optics & Electronics, IEEE/LEOS; Member of the Board of Governors, ’95, IEEE/LEOS; Member of Physics Panel, ’93-present, National Defense Science and Engineering Graduate Fellow Program; Co-chair, ’93, Conference on Ultrafast Laser and Technology, SPIE; Guest editor, ’93-present, WuLi (Chinese Physics Journal); Member, ’92-’95, Committee on Ultrafast Optics & Electronics, IEEE/LEOS

Dr. Zhang received 29 US patents; authored and co-authored 23 books and book chapters, >350 refereed papers; delivered >700 colloquium, seminars, invited conference presentations, and contributed conference talks. Google Scholar H-index of 94. ORCID: 0000-0002-7187-1829

== Honors and awards ==
Elected Foreign member of Russian Academy of Sciences ’22; Humboldt Prize, Alexander von Humboldt Foundation (Germany) ‘18; Australian Academy of Science Selby Fellow (Australia) ’17; Kenneth Button Prize ’14 (Int. Soc IRMMW-THz); William F. Meggers Award ’12 (OSA); Photonics Society William Streifer Scientific Achievement Award ’11 (IEEE); William H. Wiley Award ’09 (Rensselaer); the Trustee Celebration of Faculty Achievement Awards ’11, ’10, ’09, ’08, ‘07, ‘06, ’04, ‘03, ‘02, ‘01; Fellow of American Association for the Advancement of Science (AAAS); Fellow of American Physics Society (APS); Fellow of Institute of Electrical and Electronics Engineers (IEEE); Fellow of Optical Society of America (OSA); Heinrich Hertz Lecturer (Germany); K.C. Wong Fellow ’02; Distinguished Lecturer of IEEE/LEOS ‘98-99 & 99–00; Rensselaer's Early Career Award, ‘96; Cottrell Scholar Award, Research Corporation ‘95; K.C. Wong Prize, K.C. Wong Foundation /Hong Kong, ‘95; CAREER Award (previous NSF-NYI), National Science Foundation ‘95; AFOSR-SRPF Fellow, Hanscom Air Force Base ‘93-94; Research Initiation Award, National Science Foundation, 92.
