= Edwin H. Land Medal =

- Awarded for: Pioneering work empowered by scientific research to create inventions, technologies, and products in optics and imaging
- Presented by: The Optical Society and the Society for Imaging Science and Technology
- First award: 1993
- Website: Edwin H. land Medal

The Edwin H. Land Medal is jointly presented by The Optical Society and the Society for Imaging Science and Technology (IS&T). The Land Medal was established in 1992 to honor the noted scientist and entrepreneur Edwin H. Land, who is noted for his invention of instant photography, for founding the Polaroid Corporation, and for developing the theory of Retinex, amongst many other accomplishments. It is funded by the Polaroid Foundation, the Polaroid Retirees Association and by individual contributors Manfred Heiting, Theodore Voss and John J. McCann. The medal honors individuals who, using the science of optics, "have demonstrated pioneering entrepreneurial activity that has had a major impact on the public."

== Recipients ==
- 1993 - Howard G. Rogers
- 1994 - William E. Humphrey
- 1995 - Ichiro Endo
- 1995 - John Vaught
- 1996 - Donald Ray Scifres
- 1997 - Efi Arazi
- 1998 - Paul F. Forman, Sol F. Laufer, and Carl A. Zanoni
- 1999 - Robert H. Webb
- 2000 - John Warnock
- 2001 - Willard Boyle and George E. Smith
- 2002 - Benny Landa
- 2003 - John J. McCann
- 2004 - Steven K. Case
- 2005 - Stephen Benton
- 2006 - George H. Heilmeier
- 2007 - Charles Munnerlyn
- 2009 - Duncan T. Moore
- 2010 - Eliezer Peli
- 2011 - Mary Lou Jepsen
- 2012 - Yoichi Miyake
- 2013 - Pablo Artal
- 2014 - Mathias Fink
- 2015 - David Shaver, Joseph Mangano, and Mordechai Rothschild
- 2016 - Jan Philip P. Allebach
- 2017 - Alan Bovik
- 2018 - Ann E. Elsner
- 2019 - Nabeel Agha Riza
- 2020 - Eric Fossum
- 2021 - Joseph A. Izatt
- 2022 - Shin-Tson Wu
- 2023 - Susana Marcos Celestino
- 2024 - Ramalingam Chellappa
- 2025 - Xi-Cheng Zhang
- 2026 - Paul M. Hubel

== See also ==
- List of physics awards
