= Govind P. Agrawal =

Indian-American physicist

- Born: July 24, 1951 (age 75); Kashipur, Nainital district, India
- Citizenship: American
- Education: University of Lucknow (B.S., 1969); Indian Institute of Technology Delhi (M.S., 1971 & Ph.D., 1974)
- Awards: Max Born Award, Optica (2019) Quantum Electronics Prize, European Physical Society (2019); Esther Hoffman Beller Medal, Optica (2015); Fellow of IEEE (1996) Fellow of Optical Society of America (1986)
- Scientific career
- Fields: fiber optics, optical communications, silicon photonics, Physics
- Institutions: The Institute of Optics (1989–present) University of Rochester (1989–present); Laboratory for Laser Energetics; AT&T Bell Laboratories (1982–88); City University of New York (1977–80) École Polytechnique, France (1974–76)

Govind P. Agrawal is an Indian American physicist and a fellow of Optica, Life Fellow of the IEEE, and Distinguished Fellow of the Optical Society of India. He is the recipient of James C. Wyant Professorship of Optics at the Institute of Optics and a professor of physics at the University of Rochester. He is also a Distinguished scientist at the Laboratory for Laser Energetics (LLE) in the University of Rochester. Agrawal has authored and co-authored several highly cited books in the fields of non-linear fiber optics, optical communications, and semiconductor lasers.

== Early life ==
Agrawal was born on July 24, 1951, in Kashipur of the Nainital district, which was then a part of Uttar Pradesh. He received the B.S. in physics degree from the University of Lucknow in 1969, with honors. He received the M.S. and PhD in physics degrees from the Indian Institute of Technology Delhi, in 1971 and 1974 respectively. He worked in a post-doctoral position in École polytechnique in France, from 1974 to 1976.

== Career ==
From 1977 to 1979, Agrawal worked as a research associate at the City University of New York. During 1980 and 1981 he worked with the company Quantel, in France. Later, he was a member of technical staff at the AT&T Bell Laboratories in Murray Hill, New Jersey, where he worked from 1982 to 1988 on semiconductor lasers and nonlinear fiber optics.

Agrawal joined University of Rochester in 1989 as a Professor of Optics. In 2013, he received the first Dr. James C. Wyant Professorship in Optics in the Institute of Optics, which was established by James C. Wyant himself. From 2008 to 2013, Agrawal served on the Editorial Advisory Board, and from 2014 to 2020, he was the Editor-in-Chief of the Advances in Optics and Photonics Journal of Optical Society of America. According to Agrawal, his research interest shifted from telecommunications to silicon photonics in 2000, due to telecommunications bubble burst. After 2010, Agrawal's research focused on temporal waveguides, graded-index fibers, and optical communications.

== Awards ==
Agrawal was elected as the fellow of Optical Society of America (OSA) in 1986. In 1996, he was elected as the fellow of IEEE for "contributions to the development and understanding of semiconductor lasers and fiber-optic communications systems." In 2000, he was awarded the Distinguished Alumni Award by his alma mater, the Indian Institute of Technology Delhi. In 2012, Agrawal was awarded the Quantum Electronics Award by the IEEE Photonics Society for "sustained contributions to fiber-optic telecommunication technology through innovative research and authorship of numerous widely-respected books in the field". Agrawal was awarded the William H. Riker University Award for Graduate Teaching from the University of Rochester in 2013, during the commencement ceremony. In 2015, he was awarded the Esther Hoffman Beller Medal by the Optical Society for "inspiring and educating a generation of scientists and engineers involved with fiber-optic communications and other photonics technologies through his seminal textbooks and high-impact scientific articles". Agrawal was the recipient of two major awards in 2019: Max Born Award of the Optical Society and the Quantum Electronics Prize of the European Physical Society. He was given in 2020 the Lifetime Achievement Award by the Hajim School of Engineering of University of Rochester.

== Publications ==
Agrawal has authored or co-authored more than 500 research papers in internationally reputed scientific journals and has made more than 200 conference presentations. He has also published 10 books. Most of his publications are highly cited. His book Nonlinear Fiber Optics, first published in 1989, is now in its sixth edition and has also been translated into several languages. Another book Fiber-Optic Communication Systems, first published in 1992 and currently in its fifth edition, is used as a standard textbook in many universities for courses on telecommunication. The list of books published by Agrawal is as follows.

1. G. P. Agrawal and N. K. Dutta, Semiconductor Lasers, 2nd ed. (Springer, 2002).
2. Yu. S. Kivshar and G. P. Agrawal, Optical Solitons: From Fibers to Photonic Crystals (Academic Press, 2003).
3. G. P. Agrawal, Lightwave Technology: Components and Devices (Wiley, 2004).
4. G. P. Agrawal, Lightwave Technology: Telecommunication Systems (Wiley, 2005).
5. M. Premaratne and G. P. Agrawal, Light Propagation in Gain Media: Optical Amplifiers (Cambridge University Press, 2011).
6. G. P. Agrawal, Nonlinear Fiber Optics, 6th ed. (Academic Press, 2019).
7. G. P. Agrawal, Applications of Nonlinear Fiber Optics, 3rd ed (Academic Press, 2020).
8. M. Premaratne and G. P. Agrawal, Theoretical Foundations of Nanoscale Quantum Devices (Cambridge University Press, 2021).
9. G. P. Agrawal, Fiber-Optic Communication Systems, 5th ed. (Wiley, 2021).
10. G. P. Agrawal, Physics and Engineering of Graded-Index Media (Cambridge University Press, 2023).
