= Julie L. Bentley =

American optical physicist

Julie Bentley
- Born: Julie Lynn Bentley
- Education: University of Rochester (PhD)
- Children: 2, including Danielle
- Scientific career
- Workplaces: The Institute of Optics; Hughes Aircraft Company; Corning Inc.
- Thesis: Integration of the design and manufacture of gradient-index optical systems (1995)
- Website: www.hajim.rochester.edu/optics/people/faculty/bentley_julie

Julie Lynn Bentley is an American optical physicist who is a professor at the University of Rochester. She is a Fellow of the Optical Society of America and the Society of Photo-Optical Instrumentation Engineers (SPIE).

== Early life and education ==
Bentley earned her undergraduate and postgraduate degrees at the University of Rochester. Her doctoral research investigated the design and manufacture of gradient-index optical systems.

== Research and career ==
After her PhD, Bentley moved to the Hughes Aircraft Company, where she spent two years designing optical systems for the defence industry. Bentley is an educator, researcher and optical design consultant. She started her career at Cornel Tropel, where she designed optical assemblies. Her experience at Corning motivated her to start her own consulting company. She joined The Institute of Optics at Rochester in 2009. At Rochester, Bentley has developed optical education for both undergraduates and professionals. She has created programs on lens design, aberrations and optical design.

Bentley's research has investigated medical imaging techniques, in particular, the development of open source microscopy systems.

== Awards and honors ==
- 2012 Elected Fellow of SPIE
- 2014 University of Rochester Goergen Award for Excellence in Undergraduate Teaching
- 2014 Technology Woman of the Year by Digital Rochester
- 2019 SPIE Community Champion
- 2019 RRPC Education Award
- 2020 SPIE Community Champion
- 2020 Elected Fellow of Optica
- 2022 Optica Esther Hoffman Beller Medal
- 2022 SPIE Director's Award

== Selected publications ==
- O'Shea, Donald C.; Julie L., Bentley (2018). Designing optics using CODE V. Julie Bentley. Bellingham, Washington, USA. ISBN 978-1-5106-1974-6. OCLC 1052902062.
- Bentley, Julie L.; Olson, Craig; Youngworth, Richard N. (2010). "In the era of global optimization, the understanding of aberrations remains the key to designing superior optical systems". In Wang, Yongtian; Bentley, Julie; Du, Chunlei; Tatsuno, Kimio; Urbach, Hendrik P. (eds.). Optical Design and Testing IV. Vol. 7849. SPIE. pp. 78490C. Bibcode:2010SPIE.7849E..0CB. doi:10.1117/12.871720. S2CID 108437739.
- Yang, Tianyi; Takaki, Nick; Bentley, Julie; Schmidt, Greg; Moore, Duncan T. (2020). "Efficient representation of freeform gradient-index profiles for non-rotationally symmetric optical design". Optics Express. 28 (10): 14788–14806. Bibcode:2020OExpr..2814788Y. doi:10.1364/oe.391996. ISSN 1094-4087. PMID 32403513. S2CID 218632473.
