= Institute of Optics =

Department at the University of Rochester in Rochester, New York, U.S.

Goergen Hall: Biomedical Engineering and Optics

The Institute of Optics is a department and research center at the University of Rochester in Rochester, New York. The institute grants degrees at the bachelor's, master's and doctoral levels through the University of Rochester School of Engineering and Applied Sciences. Since its founding, the institute has granted over 2,500 degrees in optics, making up about half of the degrees awarded in the field in the United States. The institute is made up of 20 full-time professors, 12 professors with joint appointments in other departments, 10 adjunct professors, 5 research scientists, 11 staff, about 170 undergraduate students and about 110 graduate students.

== History ==
Founded in 1929, through a grant from Eastman Kodak and Bausch and Lomb, the institute is the oldest educational program in the United States devoted to optics. During World War I, many American defense companies relied heavily on German optics. The need for an American-based institution of optical training became apparent when the flow of German imports, including optics, attenuated.

The Institute of Optics has long been deeply involved in American optics study and research. The Optical Society of America was founded in 1916 by 30 optical scientists and instrument makers based in Rochester.

The proximity of Rochester to many optical companies has provided an excellent environment for collaboration with industry, as well as funding for research. Companies have in the past included Xerox, Eastman Kodak and Bausch and Lomb but the institute's Industrial Associates has expanded to include nearly 50 companies. Notable local members include Optimax, Corning Inc and L3Harris. Altogether there are over 100 companies in the Rochester NY and Finger Lakes region for whom optics, photonics, and lasers are a central part of the business.

The Institute of Optics occupied the top floor of Bausch and Lomb Hall from 1931 to 1977. Currently, the institute is primarily housed in the Wilmot Building on the River Campus of the University of Rochester; construction began in 1961 with support from NASA, as well as other buildings and centers, including the Laboratory for Laser Energetics. The institute successfully expanded into the new Robert B. Goergen Hall for Biomedical Engineering and Optics, which was completed in March 2007 and was dedicated on May 17, 2007.

In 2018, Donna Strickland, became the institute's first alumnus to become a Nobel laureate, winning the Nobel Prize in Physics with former institute professor Gérard Mourou.

== Academic programs ==
The Institute of Optics has been granting degrees in optics since its founding in 1929. Beginning with a BS program that included foundational physics, optical design and engineering, optical physics, and medical optics, the program eventually expanded to include MS and PhD programs. The first graduate of the institute was Arthur Ingalls (BS 1932). The first graduate of the MS and PhD programs was Robert E. Hopkins, who later became a professor and director of the institute. Now part of the Hajim School of Engineering and Applied Sciences, the institute continues to offer BS, MS and PhD degrees and has an enrollment of about 300 students. Students go on to careers in optical engineering, optical physics, entrepreneurship, biomedical sciences, and a variety of other career paths.

== Notable faculty ==
- Former Director Duncan Moore: Former President of Optica, Pioneer in the field of gradient index optics and leader in technical entrepreneurship.
- Former Director Xicheng Zhang: Pioneer in the field of teraHertz technology.
- Former Director P. Scott Carney: Pioneer in the field of physical optics with notable contributions to biomedical optics.
- Former Director Wayne H. Knox: Former Director of the Advanced Photonics Research Department at Bell Labs and pioneer in ultrafast optics and femtosecond laser ophthalmology.
- Current director Thomas G. Brown: Noted for the study of unconventional polarization states of light and leader in AIM Photonics.
- Govind Agrawal: Pioneer and highly cited author in Optical Communications, Optical Fibers, and Nonlinear Optics.
- Robert W. Boyd: Pioneer and highly cited author in non-linear optics and quantum optics.
- David Williams: Former director of the Center for Visual Science, pioneer in the use of adaptive optics for retinal imaging.
- Susana Marcos: Current director of the Center for Visual Science, pioneer in vision science and engineering.
- Joseph H. Eberly: Pioneer in the field of quantum optics, former President of the Optical Society of America, and founding editor of Optics Express, the first open access publication in optics.
- James Zavislan: Professor of Optics, Biomedical Engineering and Ophthalmology.
- James Fienup: Pioneer in optical imaging and phase retrieval.
- Chunlei Guo: Pioneer in femtosecond laser processing of materials.
- Andrew Berger: Award-winning educator and expert in biomedical optics.
- Julie Bentley : Award-winning educator and expert in optical design.
- Jannick Rolland: Director of the Center for Freeform Optics and the Robert E. Hopkins Center for Optical Design and Engineering.
- Susan Houde-Walter: Former President of Optica, Entrepreneur, Pioneer in the field of optical materials.
- Director Dennis G. Hall: Pioneer in the field of guided-wave optics and electromagnetic theory and was among the first to predict the emergence of silicon photonics.
- Interim Director Ian Walmsley: Pioneer in Quantum Optics, co-invented Spectral phase interferometry for direct electric-field reconstruction (SPIDER), formerly of the University of Oxford Department of Physics, currently Provost of Imperial College (London UK).
- Lukas Novotny: Pioneer in nano-optics.
- Carlos Stroud: Pioneer in the field of quantum optics and Quantum Information.
- Former Director Nicholas George: Pioneer in physical optics, holography, and electronic imaging.
- Leonard Mandel: Pioneer in the field of quantum optics, first demonstrated photon self interference, discovered the Mandel Formula.
- Rudolf Kingslake: Pioneer in the field of lens design, founding faculty member.
- Robert E. Hopkins: Pioneer in the field of optical engineering, former director and founder of Tropel Corporation.
- M. Parker Givens: Director of the institute from 1975 to 1977
- Stephen Jacobs: Pioneer in Liquid Crystals, and in Magneto-Rheological Finishing.
- Emil Wolf: Pioneer in the field of coherence theory and quantum optics, predicted the Wolf Effect.
- Former Director Kenneth Teegarden: Pioneer in exciton physics and color centers.

== Research areas ==
- Biomedical optics
- Coherence theory
- Fiber optics
- Quantum optics
- Laser physics
- Polarization
- Non-linear optics
- Laser-based nuclear fusion
- Nanotechnology
- Integrated Photonics especially Silicon Photonics
- Vision Science and Vision Engineering
- Optical Engineering
- Freeform Optics
- Optical Design and Optical Metrology
