= Susana Marcos Celestino =

Spanish scientist, physicist and physiologist

- Born: September 25, 1970 (age 55); Salamanca (Spain)
- Education: University of Salamanca
- Awards: Fellow of Optica Adolph Lomb Medal (2002) Selección Española de la Ciencia (2016) Premio Rey Jaime I a las Nuevas Tecnologías (2017) Medalla Ramón y Cajal (2019) Premio Nacional de Investigación Leonardo Torres Quevedo (2019)
- Scientific career
- Fields: Optics
- Workplaces: CSIC

Susana Marcos Celestino (born September 25, 1970) is a Spanish physicist specialising in human vision and applied optics. She was the Director of Optica (formerly the Optical Society) in 2012.

Through studies in ocular imaging, she has pioneered the development of innovative intraocular lenses and the detection of ocular pathogens and infections. Notably, she co-created a visual simulator for presbyopia and cataract intraocular lenses, providing a pre-surgical assessment. This simulator is a product of 2EyesVision, a company she co-founded.

In July 2021, she was appointed Director of Center for Visual Science, with dual affiliation in Optics and in Ophthalmology at the University of Rochester.

== Education ==
Marcos studied at the University of Salamanca in her hometown and obtained an M.Sc. and then Ph.D. in Physics, which she was granted with a special award after her work as a predoctoral fellow in the Consejo Superior de Investigaciones Científicas (CSIC). Her PhD advisor was the scientist Pablo Artal. She had postdoctoral training in Europe and the United States.

== Academic career ==
Marcos Celestino's work focuses upon the development of diagnostic and correctional instruments in ophthalmology.

From 1993 to 1996, Celestino had a predoctoral fellowship in the Department of Vision and Physiological Optics at the Institute of Optics of the CSIC in Madrid, Spain. Celestino spent three years, from 1997 to 2000, as a postdoctoral researcher in the Schepens Eye Research Institute of the Harvard University Medical School in Boston.

Celestino went back to Spain in 2000, getting a position at the CSIC, first as a senior scientist and later as a research professor. In 2005 she got the position of titular scientist of the CSIC, developing her own Institute of Optics. In 2006, she was awarded the position of professor of research at the CSIC, and in 2008 she was nominated director of the Institute of Optics "Daza de Valdés". She held this position until 2012.

Marcos Celestino was awarded the King Jaime Prize in New Technologies, the Physics, Innovation and Technology Prize of the Royal Spanish Society of Physics, the Adolph Lomb Prize of Optica and the ICO Prize from the International Optics commission. In 2019, Marcos Celestino was awarded the 'Leonardo Torres Quevedo' National Award in the field of engineering. In 2023, she received Optica and the Society for Imaging Science and Technology's Edwin H. Land Medal, "For pioneering developments and translation of diagnostic and correction ophthalmic technologies impacting millions of patients worldwide."

=== Participation in professional societies ===
- 1999–2001. Vice President of the technical group Applications of Visual Science of Optica.
- 2001–2003. Chair of the Applications of Visual Science Technical Group of Optica: vision and division of the colors.
- 2004-2008. President of the National Committee of Visual Science, Socieda Española de Óptica.
- 2003. President of the Department of Image and Vision, Optics Institute, CSIC.
- 2008. Member of the Physiological Optics and Visual Psychophysical Committee, Association for Research in Vision and Ophthalmology.
- 2009-2012 Director of the Optics Institute Daza de Valdés, CSIC.
- 2011 Faculty Madrid MIT M + Vision Consortium.
- 2012 Director of the Physics Center Miguel Ángel Catalán, CSIC.
- 2012 Director-at-large Optica.

=== Funding and scholarships ===
Celestino was the recipient of the following scholarships for research:

- 1992 Beca del Consejo Superior de Investigaciones Científicas
- 1993 Research Comunidá. University of Salamanca
- 1997 she was awarded a Fulbright postdoctoral fellowship
- 1997-1999 fellowship for a long-term program on Human Rescue Science
- 2001 scholarship for visiting professionals at University of Queensland

== Patents ==
Celestino patented several methods and elements that modify or improve optical deficiencies and with crucial advances in ophthalmology. This has been described as unusual for a Spanish scientist.
