= Stephen D. Fantone =

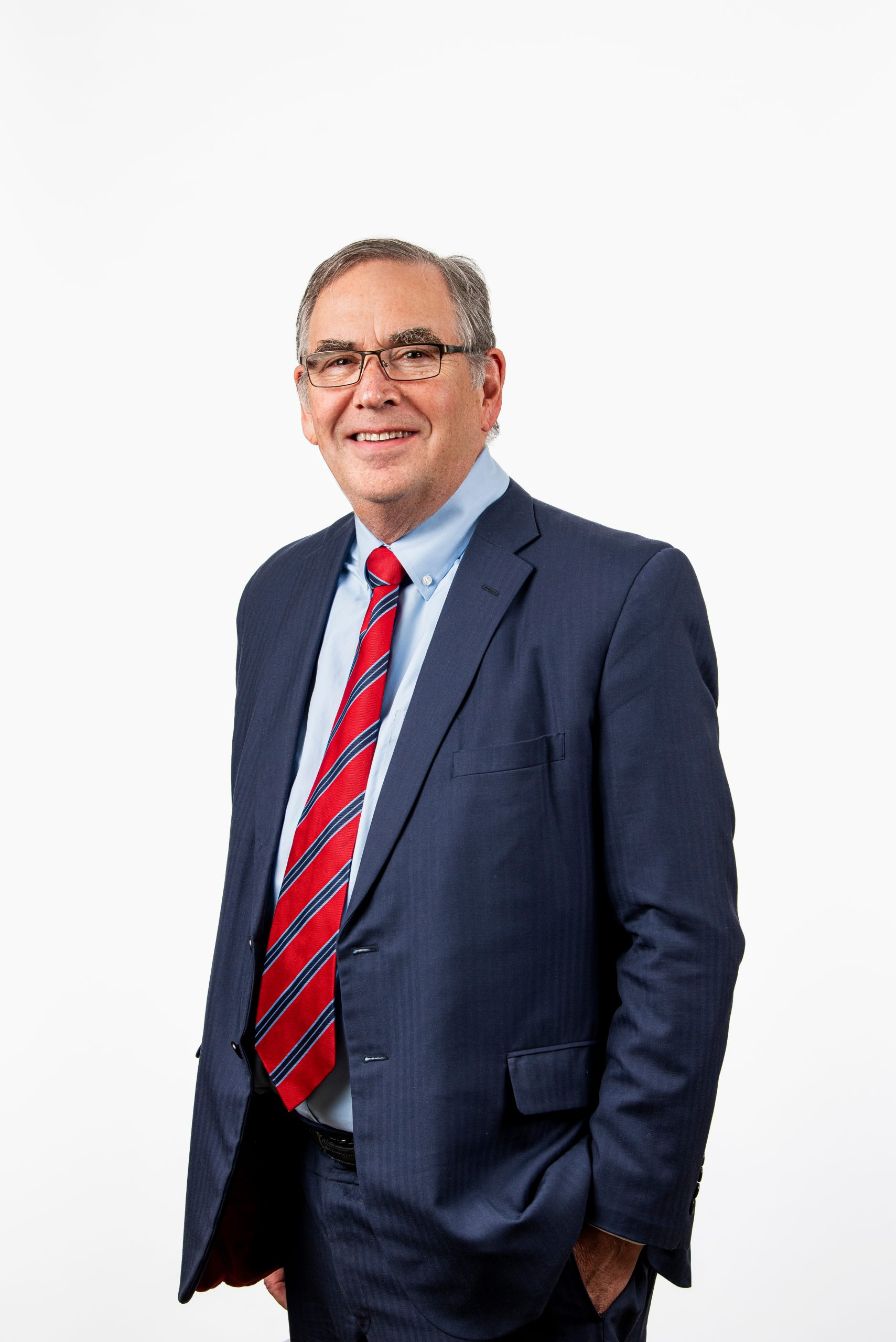
Stephen D. Fantone

Stephen D. Fantone is an optical engineer, inventor, and businessman. He is the founder and CEO of Optikos Corporation, an optical engineering company based in Wakefield, MA, USA. Fantone is also Senior Lecturer in the Mechanical Engineering Department at the Massachusetts Institute of Technology (MIT) since 1996. He serves on a variety of boards of directors for organizations such as the Pioneer Institute for Public Policy Research, the Hertz Foundation, and the Optica Foundation.

Fantone has been awarded over 70 patents in optical technology applications[3] and is a member of the National Academy of Engineering.

In 2013, the Optica Foundation renamed its Distinguished Service Award after Fantone, an award that is “presented to individuals who, over an extended period of time, have served Optica in an outstanding way, especially through volunteer participation in its management, operation or planning in such ways as editorship of a periodical, organization of meetings, or other service to Optica.”

Fantone specializes in optical design and engineering, optical metrology systems, consumer and industrial product design, imaging systems, infrared imaging, and optically based IP development.

== Early life and education ==
Stephen D. Fantone was born in Buffalo, New York, to Jeannette Dennehy and Joseph C. Fantone, Jr. His father was a mechanical engineer who graduated from MIT, class of 1948. His mother graduated from Boston University in 1950 and worked as an administrative officer. Fantone has four other siblings. The family eventually moved to Connecticut, where Fantone attended several public schools until he reached 11th grade, after which he went to study at MIT. His favorite subjects in school were physics and mathematics.

He earned his dual S.B. degrees in Electrical Engineering and Management from MIT, followed by a Ph.D. from the University of Rochester's Institute of Optics.

Fantone was the first postgraduate student of Professor Duncan T. Moore in the field of gradient index optics at the Institute of Optics in Rochester. Moore is widely recognized as a leading authority in gradient index optics research. Fantone's doctoral thesis, titled "Design and Manufacturing Aspects of Gradient Index Optics," made significant contributions to the field by developing computational tools for advanced image aberration calculations in lenses incorporating gradient index glasses. The research also established predictive models for determining glass properties based on ion-exchange diffusion manufacturing processes.

== Career ==
Fantone joined the Polaroid Corporation in September 1978 while pursuing his Ph.D., working as an optical engineer on advancing their core imaging technologies. During his time at Polaroid, he founded Optikos Corporation as an engineering consultancy for optical applications. While leading the Optikos Corporation, the company launched several metrology systems including LensCheck™ and OpTest® for testing a wide range of lenses as well as the Meridian® systems which offer production or lab testing of small, wide-field cameras.

From 2012 through 2020, Fantone chaired the board of directors of the Pioneer Institute, a free-market think tank in Massachusetts affiliated with the right-wing State Policy Network.

His previous board service includes positions at Rofin-Sinar Technologies, Inc. (until its acquisition by Coherent, Inc. in November 2016), Zygo Corporation (until its acquisition by Ametek), and as chairman of Benthos, Inc., an oceanographic and package inspection instrumentation company, from 1996 until its acquisition by Teledyne Technologies, Inc.

== Awards and honors ==
In recognition of his service contributions, Optica named its Distinguished Service Award in honor of Stephen D. Fantone in 2013. He previously received the Optica Distinguished Service Award in 2007.

Academic honors include the University of Rochester Distinguished Scholar Award (2015) and Distinguished Alumnus Award (2009). He was elected to the National Academy of Engineering in 2022 and named an Optica Fellow in 1984 and a SPIE Fellow in 2016.

== Philanthropy ==
Fantone has been extensively involved in philanthropic and professional service activities throughout his career.

He served as a Hertz Foundation Fellow from 1975-1978, he has been involved with the growth of the foundation’s mission and activities, and has been a board member since 2008, advancing to board chair in 2023. The Hertz Foundation provides graduate fellowships in applied physical, biological and engineering sciences.

He held leadership positions with the Pioneer Institute, serving as board member from 2008-2020, chair from 2012–2020, and chair emeritus from 2020–present. The Pioneer Institute is a Boston-based public policy research organization. Since 2023, he has also served as a member of the board of directors for the Pioneer New England Legal Foundation.

Fantone has also provided extensive service to Optica (formerly known as the Optical Society of America), serving as board member (1992-1995), Treasurer, Vice-President (2018), president-elect (2019), and president (2020). His total board service spans approximately 25 years. He has also served on the Board of the Optica Foundation for 23 years, from its inception to the present. His contribution is summarized on the official Optica website as follows: “Fantone is often consulted for his expertise in optical engineering and optical product development. He has served on numerous program review panels, provided expert testimony on patent infringement and trade secret litigation cases."
