= Judith F. Donnelly =

American physics educator

Judith (Judy) F. Donnelly is an American physics educator specializing in optics and photonics education, and known for pushing education in those subjects into the secondary school and community college curricula. She is retired as a professor emerita from Three Rivers Community College in Norwich, Connecticut.

== Education and career ==
Donnelly was an undergraduate at Tufts University. She received a master's degree from the University of Connecticut.

She began teaching physics at Three Rivers Community College in approximately 1978. After teaching classical physics "for many years", she began teaching photonics there in 1995, and in 1997 she founded an associate degree program in laser and fiber optic technology. She later led an annual Laser Camp program for high school students. She retired as a professor emerita in 2014.

== Books ==
Donnelly is a coauthor of the textbooks Light: Introduction to Optics and Photonics (with Nicholas M. Massa, New England Board of Higher Education, 2007; 2nd edition, Photonics Media, 2018), and Exploring Light – Investigations for Optics Education (with Nancy Magnani, SPIE Press / John Wiley & Sons, 2nd edition, 2025).

== Recognition ==
Donnelly was the inaugural recipient of the SPIE María J. Yzuel Educator Award, in 2003. She was the 2012 recipient of the Esther Hoffman Beller Medal, awarded annually by Optica for outstanding contributions to optics education.

She was named as a Fellow of Optica in 2012, "for outstanding dedication to engaging middle, high school and college students in optical science and engineering education", and is also a Fellow of SPIE.
