= James C. Wyant =

American optical engineer

- Born: July 31, 1943
- Died: December 8, 2023 (aged 80)
- Education: University of Rochester
- Scientific career
- Fields: Optics
- Workplaces: University of Arizona
- Thesis: Effect of the photographic gamma on hologram reconstructions (1968)
- Doctoral advisor: M. Parker Givens

James Clair Wyant (July 31, 1943 – December 8, 2023) was a professor at the College of Optical Sciences at the University of Arizona where he was Director (1999–2005) and Dean (2005–2012). He received a B.S. in physics from Case Western Reserve University and M.S. and Ph.D. in optics from the Institute of Optics at the University of Rochester.

== Career ==
He was a founder of the WYKO Corporation and served as its president and board chairman from 1984 to 1997. He was also a founder of the 4D Technology Corporation and served as its board chairman. Wyant was a member of the National Academy of Engineering, a Fellow of Optica, SPIE (International Society of Optics and Photonics), and the Optical Society of India, an honorary member of the Optical Society of Korea, and former editor-in-chief of the OSA journal Applied Optics. He was the 2010 president of OSA and the 1986 president of SPIE. Since 2010, he had been a member of the Board of Trustees of Case Western Reserve University. In April 2019, the College of Optical Sciences at the University of Arizona was renamed to be the James C. Wyant College of Optical Sciences in his honor.

== Awards ==
- AccountabilIT Lifetime Achievement Award from the Arizona Technology Council, 2019
- SPIE Visionary Award, 2019
- Optica Joseph Fraunhofer Award
- SPIE Gold Medal, 2003
- SPIE Technology Achievement Award
- SPIE Chandra Vikram Award
- University of Rochester College of Engineering Distinguished Alumnus Award
- Doctorado Honoris Causa from the Instituto Nacional de Astrofisica, Optica y Electronica in Puebla, Mexico.
- Arizona's “Innovator of the Year” Product Award
- Tom Brown Excellence in Entrepreneurship Award
- University of Arizona Technology Innovation Award;
- Arizona Technology Council William F. McWhortor Award.
- Optica Frederic Ives Medal/Jarus W. Quinn Prize
- Optica Honorary Membership
