= Ulrich Lemmer =

German professor in electrical engineering

Ulrich Lemmer (born May 1964) is a German electrical engineer and professor specializing in optoelectronics.

== Education ==
Ulrich Lemmer received a diploma degree in physics from RWTH Aachen University in 1990 and a Ph.D. from the University of Marburg in 1995. From 1995 to 1996, he held a postdoctoral position with the University of California at Santa Barbara.

== Career ==
In 2002, Lemmer was appointed as a full Professor and director of the Light Technology Institute, Karlsruhe Institute of Technology. He is also one of the directors of the Institute for Microstructure Technology. Lemmer was awarded with the Esther Hoffman Beller Medal in 2018. The primary reason for the honor was for developing a vision for an international education program in optics that appreciates its importance as an enabling technology, and for successfully establishing the Karlsruhe School of Optics & Photonics (KSOP). In 2019, he was elected a Fellow of OSA.

== Publications ==
Lemmer is an author of over 400 journal publications, 17 patents or patent applications, and 9 books and book articles.
