= Imrana Ashraf =

Pakistani physicist

Imrana Ashraf Zahid is a Pakistani physicist whose research concerns quantum optics and atom optics. A former faculty member in the Department of Physics at Quaid-i-Azam University, and an associate of the International Centre for Theoretical Physics in Trieste, Italy, she is also known for her work in outreach and physics education.

== Early life, education, and career ==
Ashraf was encouraged by her grandfather to study mathematics, but discouraged by her father. She became an undergraduate at Quaid-i-Azam University, the first woman in her family to go to university. After obtaining an undergraduate degree, she again faced opposition from her father to continue her studies, but was supported by her grandfather. During her graduate studies, Suhail Zubairy joined the department, in 1984, and through him she became interested in quantum optics. To forestall the same family conflict arising a third time, she switched from an M.Phil. program directly into a Ph.D. program. She completed a Ph.D. in quantum optics in only three years, under Zubairy's supervision. She was the first woman in Pakistan to receive a Ph.D. in quantum optics.

After postdoctoral studies with Zubairy, Ashraf joined the Pakistan Atomic Energy Commission. She returned to Quaid-i-Azam University as an assistant professor in 1994. In 2000, motivated by personal infertility, she changed her focus from research to education, and began working both on education of girls in her home village and internationally in optics education through the International Centre for Theoretical Physics; she continued this work after adopting a niece in 2002. In 2015 she founded a nation-wide optics outreach program for girls in Pakistan, Active Learning in Optics.

== Recognition ==
Ashraf was one of two winners of the 2004 ICO/ICTP Gallieno Denardo Award, for her research on micromasers, and one of four winners of the 2017 ICTP Spirit of Abdus Salam Award. She was the first female winner of the Gallieno Denardo Award.

She received the Esther Hoffman Beller Medal of Optica in 2026, "for her dedication to optics education at her university and at events targeting students from economically developing countries, as well as for the organization of numerous educational and outreach events in rural areas of Pakistan". She was elected as an Optica Fellow, in the 2027 class of fellows.
