= Pablo Artal =

Spanish physicist and university teacher

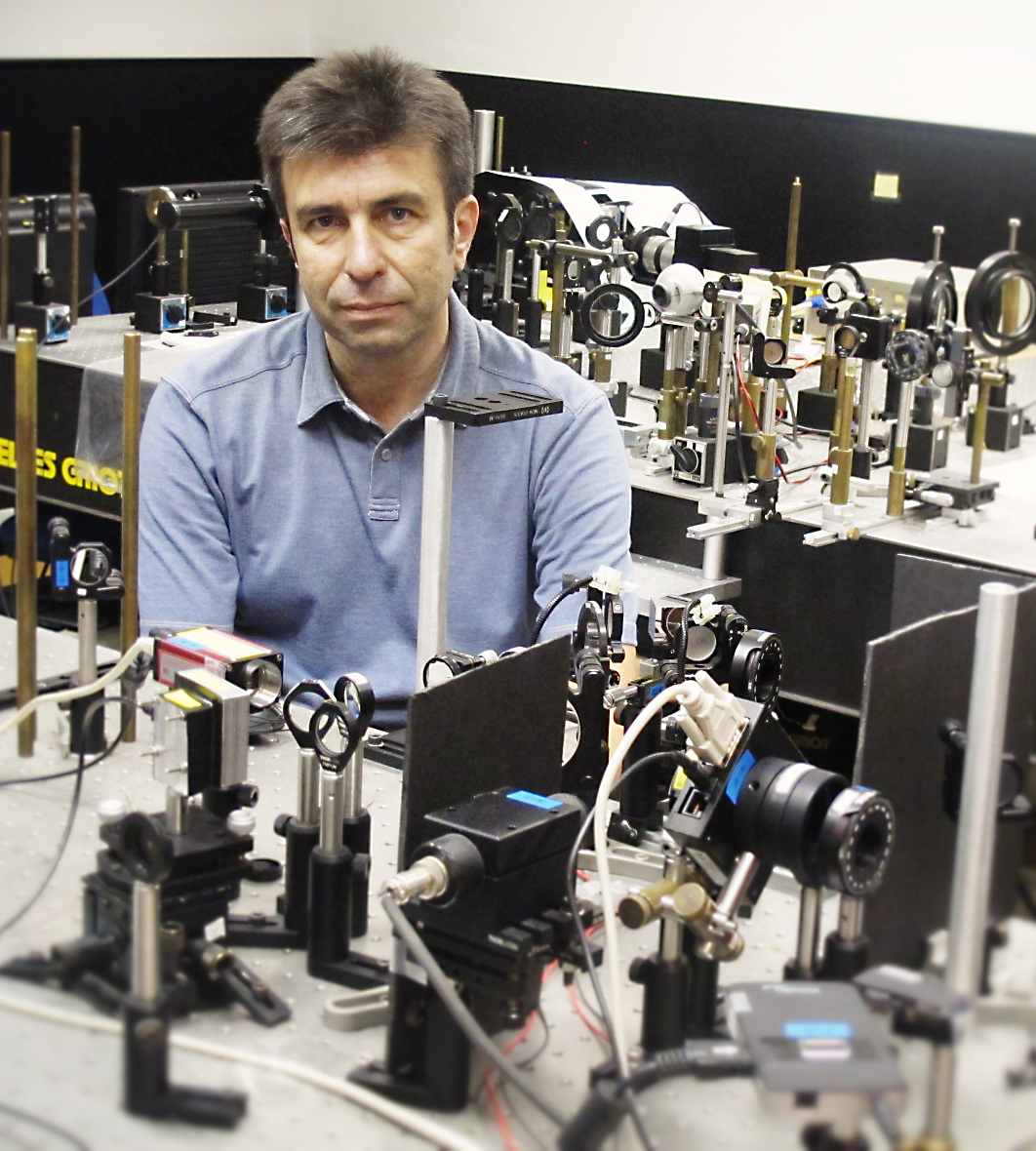
Pablo Artal

Pablo Artal (born June 12, 1961, in Zaragoza) is a Spanish physicist and full professor specialized in optics at the University of Murcia, as well as in the development and application of new techniques in human vision research. He is the founder and director of the Optics Lab at Murcia University and received the Spanish National Research award "Juan de la Cierva" and the Rey Jaime I Award for New Technologies in 2015. His main research topics are the optics of the eye and the retina and the development of optical and electronic imaging techniques in the field of biomedicine, ophtalmology and vision. He has contributed to the advance of methods for the study of the optics of the eye and contributed to the understanding of the factors that limit the resolution of the human vision. Moreover, his discoveries and ideas have been applied to instruments and devices used in the clinical practice of ophthalmology.

== Biography ==
After earning a MSc degree in physics from the University of Zaragoza, he joined the Institute of Optics of the Higher Council of Scientific Research (CSIC) located in Madrid as a PhD student in 1984. His PhD supervisor was Javier Santamaria. After his doctorate he was a post-doctoral fellow at the University of Cambridge, UK and the Institut d'Optique, Orsay (France).

Back to Spain, he became a permanent researcher at the Institute of Optics (CSIC). Since 1994 he has been the first Full Professor of Optics at the University of Murcia, and was the funder of the Optics Laboratory. He is also an elected fellow member of the Optical Society of America (OSA), fellow of the Association for research in Vision and Ophthalmology (ARVO) and the European Optical Society (EOS). He is a member of the Academy of Sciences of the Region of Murcia and the Academy of Medicine and a distinguished visiting professor at the Central South University in Changsha (China).

He was awarded with the Edwin H. Land Medal by the OSA and the Society for Imaging Science and Technology (IS&T), "For scientific contributions to the advancement of diagnostic and correction alternatives in visual optics" (2013). The European Research Council granted Artal with an Advanced Research grant in 2014 with a total budget of 2.5 million euros for the creation of optoelectronic glasses. He received the 'Rey Jaime I' Award for New Technologies in 2015. The mention states that he hold more than 20 international patents and was founder of five companies in the field of optics... [which] has helped to improve the quality of life of people around the world." In May 2016, he announced that he dedicated 20,000 of the 100,000 euros obtained from the Rey Jaime I to support ten scholarships for the most talented undergraduate students enrolled in the science degrees at the University of Murcia. Artal won the Juan de la Cierva Spanish National Research Award in 2018 and the Edgar D. Tillyer award of the OSA for “the pioneering use of optics and photonics technologies to unravel the human visual system and to improve eye diagnostics and correction”. He was the recipient of the Gold Medal of the Royal Spanish Society of Physics.

Artal is co-inventor of 35 patents in the Optics and Ophtalmology fields and the co-founder of two spin-off companies (Voptica SL & Visiometrics SL) focused on optical solutions and diagnostic instruments. According to Google Scholar, he has published more than 400 scientific studies with more than 25200 citations and with a h-index of 85. He has participated in more than 300 invited presentations in international meetings and approximately 300 seminars in scientific institutions across the world. He edited the two-volume “Handbook of Visual Optics” in 2017. In May 2026, he edited the second edition of the Handbook of Visual Optics. In 2026, Artal published "I Have Cataracts: What Should I Know?", a patient-oriented guide explaining cataracts and their treatment from the perspective of an optical scientist.

Some of his inventions are already present in the clinical practice: the adaptive optics visual simulator (VAO) http://voptica.com and a new type of intraocular lenses with inverted meniscus shape that improves the quality of vision in the periphery (ArtIOLs).
