= Janice Hudgings =

American physicist and educator

Janice A. Hudgings
- Education: Swarthmore College (BA, BS); New College, Oxford (MSc); University of California, Berkeley (MS, PhD)
- Occupations: Physicist and educator
- Employers: Alenas Imaging; Pomona College
- Spouse: Sharon Stranford

Janice A. Hudgings is an American physicist and educator whose research interests include optics and semiconductor devices. She is the Seeley W. Mudd Professor of Physics at Pomona College in Claremont, California.

== Education ==
Hudgings attended Swarthmore College, graduating with a Bachelor of Arts and a Bachelor of Science in mathematics and engineering in 1991. She then was selected as a Rhodes Scholar at Oxford University, where she earned a Master of Science (M.Sc.) in mathematics as a member of New College, Oxford. Hudgings afterwards completed a second M.S. and her Ph.D. in electrical engineering at the University of California, Berkeley, in 1999.

== Career ==
Hudgings taught physics at Mount Holyoke College, where she was an associate dean of faculty. She co-founded the thermal imaging company Alenas Imaging, and was its vice president and chief technology officer from 2007 to 2012. In 2013, she came to Pomona College, where she is the Seeley W. Mudd Professor of Physics. Her research interests include optics and semiconductor devices. She was Vice President for Academic Affairs and Dean of the College, a position in which she pursued diversity initiatives. After returning to the faculty, Hudgings was recognized for her innovative teaching and work as a mentor for Claremont Colleges groups promoting women in STEM and LGBTQA+ students in STEM.

== Recognition ==
Hudgings was awarded a National Science Foundation CAREER Award in 2002. She is an Optical Society of America Fellow, and was awarded the Esther Hoffman Beller Medal in 2004. In 2018, she won Pomona's Wig Distinguished Professor Award, the college's highest faculty honor, in recognition of her teaching. In 2020, Hudgings won the Claremont Colleges' Diversity Mentoring Award.

== Personal life ==
Hudgings is married to Sharon Stranford, a biology professor at Pomona. She enjoys hiking.
