= University of Rochester College of Arts Sciences and Engineering =

Department of the University of Rochester, in the United States

University of Rochester College of Arts, Sciences, and Engineering
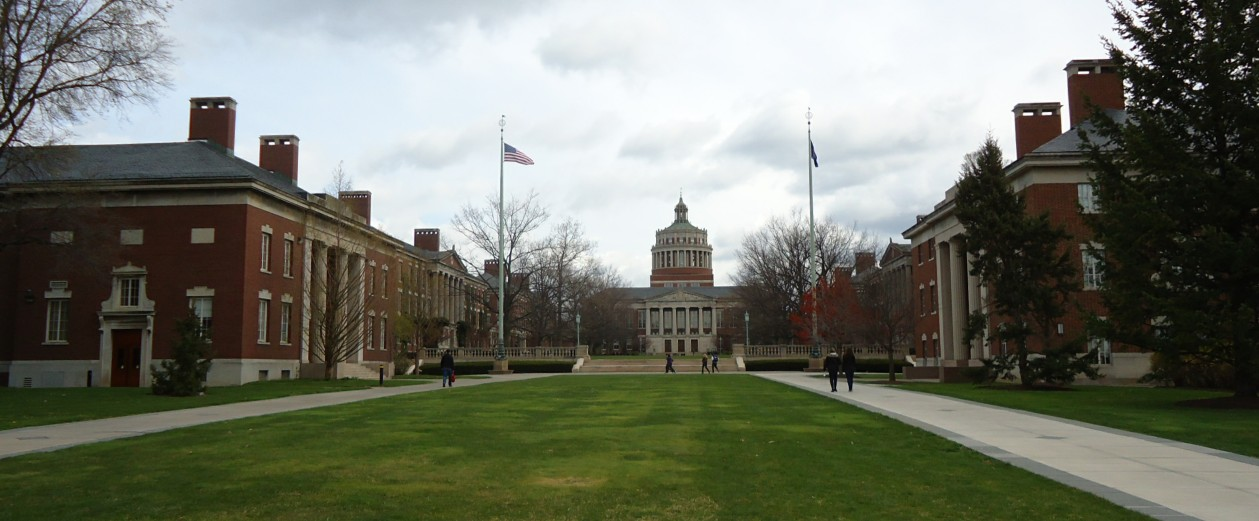
- Type: Private
- Established: 1955
- Dean: Duje Tadin, Interim Dean
- Location: Rochester, New York, USA
- Campus: Suburban
- Website: rochester.edu/college

The College of Arts, Sciences, and Engineering is one of the primary units of the University of Rochester, encompassing the majority of the undergraduate and graduate enrollment. The College is divided in the units of Arts and Sciences and the Hajim School of Engineering and Applied Sciences. The College is located on the River Campus of the University of Rochester, though some departments maintain facilities on other campuses. The College was established in 1955 upon the merger of the separate colleges for men and women at the university.

On October 16, 2024, it was announced that the College would be dissolved, with the Dean, Jeffrey Runner, stepping down at the end of the year, to be replaced with a new position, Senior Vice Provost for Academic Excellence.

== Undergraduate academics ==
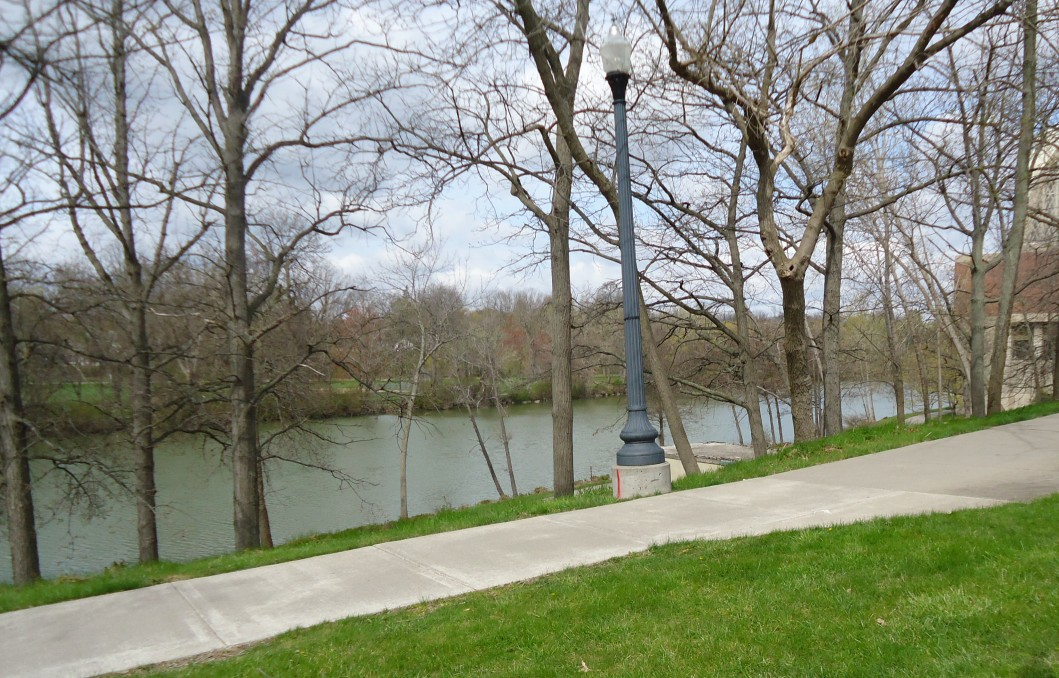
The Genesee River

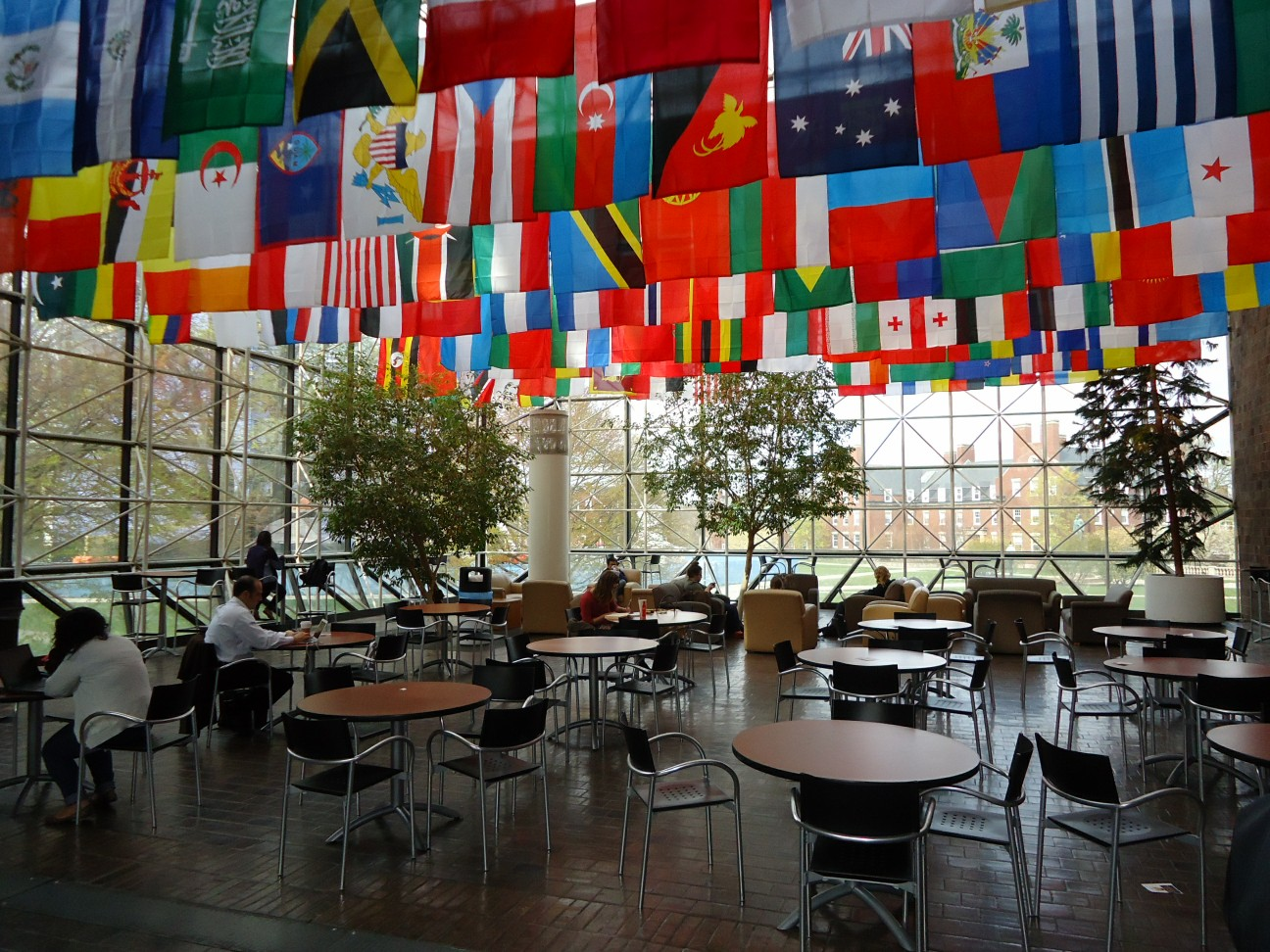
Flags denote the home countries of students currently attending the college

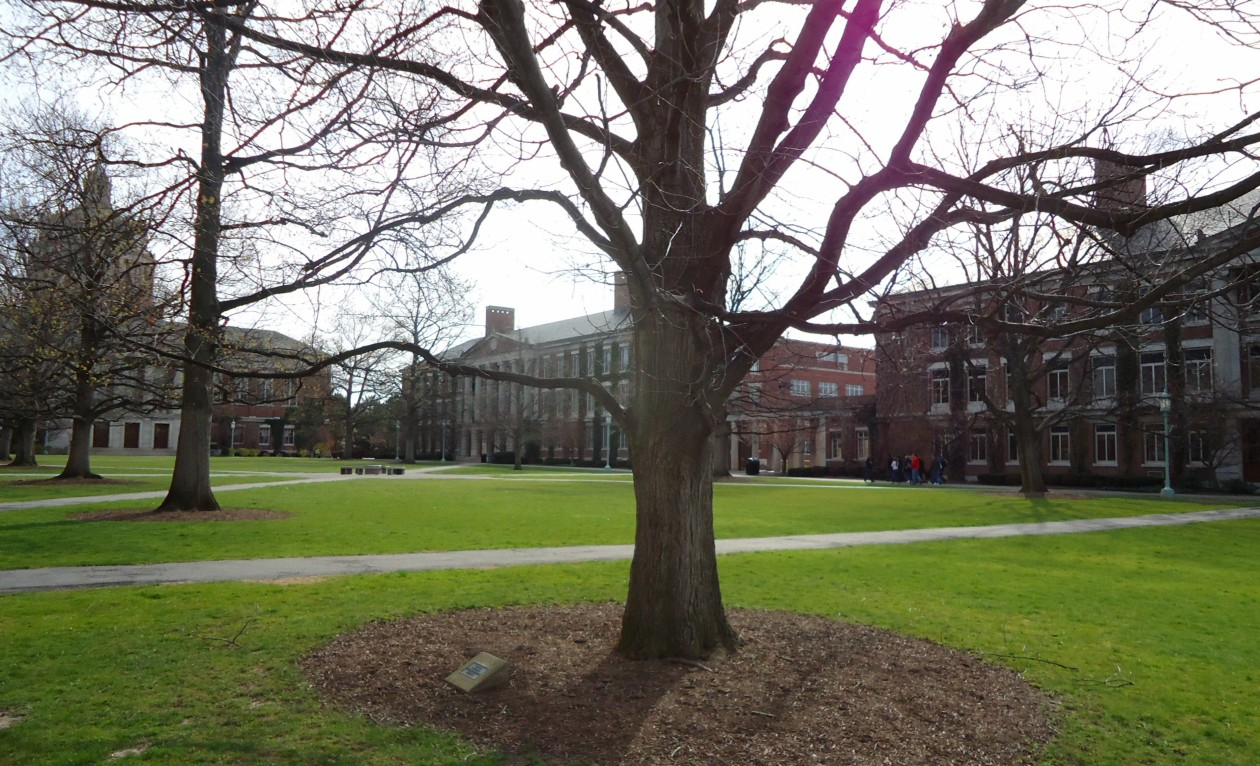
Main quadrangle

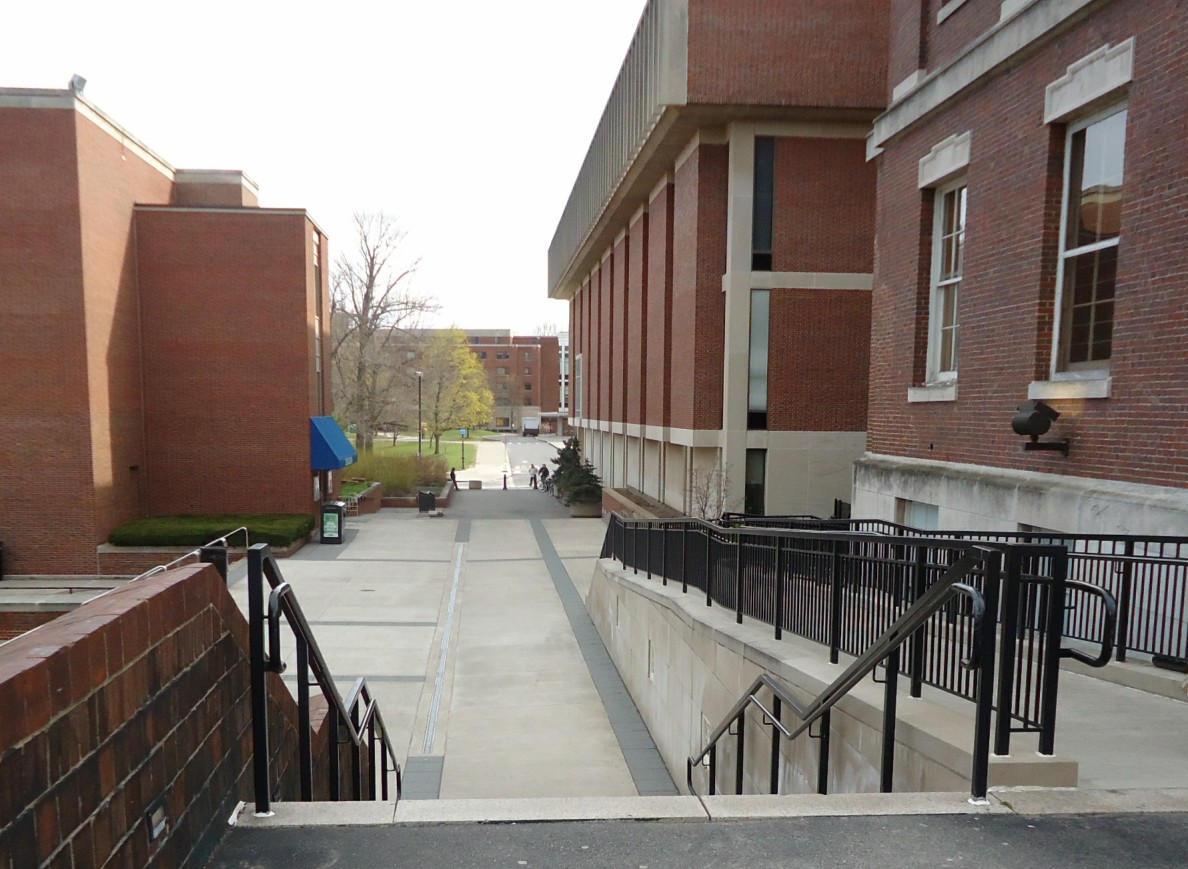
Walkway between Rush Rhees library and the Frederick Douglass building

Undergraduate education at the College has no required subjects or core curriculum common to all students. The only class that resembles a requirement is WRT 105 or Reasoning and Writing in the College, which serves as the primary writing requirement, though it is not required with certain test scores. It is also not a single class, but rather a set of courses with different subjects to allow for diversity of interest.

All undergraduates are required to pursue study in three areas of knowledge: humanities, social sciences and natural sciences. Aside from a concentration, which falls into one of the areas of study, undergraduate students must complete at least one "cluster" of related courses (usually 3–4 courses) within each of the remaining areas. For example, a student with a concentration in mathematics, a natural science field, must complete at least one cluster in the humanities and one in social sciences. A second concentration or a minor also satisfies this requirement. The only exceptions are students concentrating in an accredited engineering field (biomedical engineering, chemical engineering, electrical and computer engineering or mechanical engineering), who are only required to have one cluster in either humanities or social sciences.

== Tuition and financial aid ==
2013–14 River Campus undergraduate tuition is estimated at $45,372. Total charges (including room and board, fees, books, and personal expenses) is approximately $61,340. More than $40 million is given in financial aid (does not include federal and state grants and loans). Most Rochester undergraduates receive some form of financial assistance, including academic merit scholarships. More than 95 percent of Ph.D. students receive financial aid, usually enough to cover tuition and living expenses.

== Departments and concentrations ==
Students may take courses from any of the many departments within the College. Each department may offer concentrations, minors, clusters or other degree programs. There are also many interdepartmental programs and students have the option of creating their own courses of study with a special application. The College also offers graduate programs of study in addition to undergraduate.

=== Departments in Arts and Sciences ===
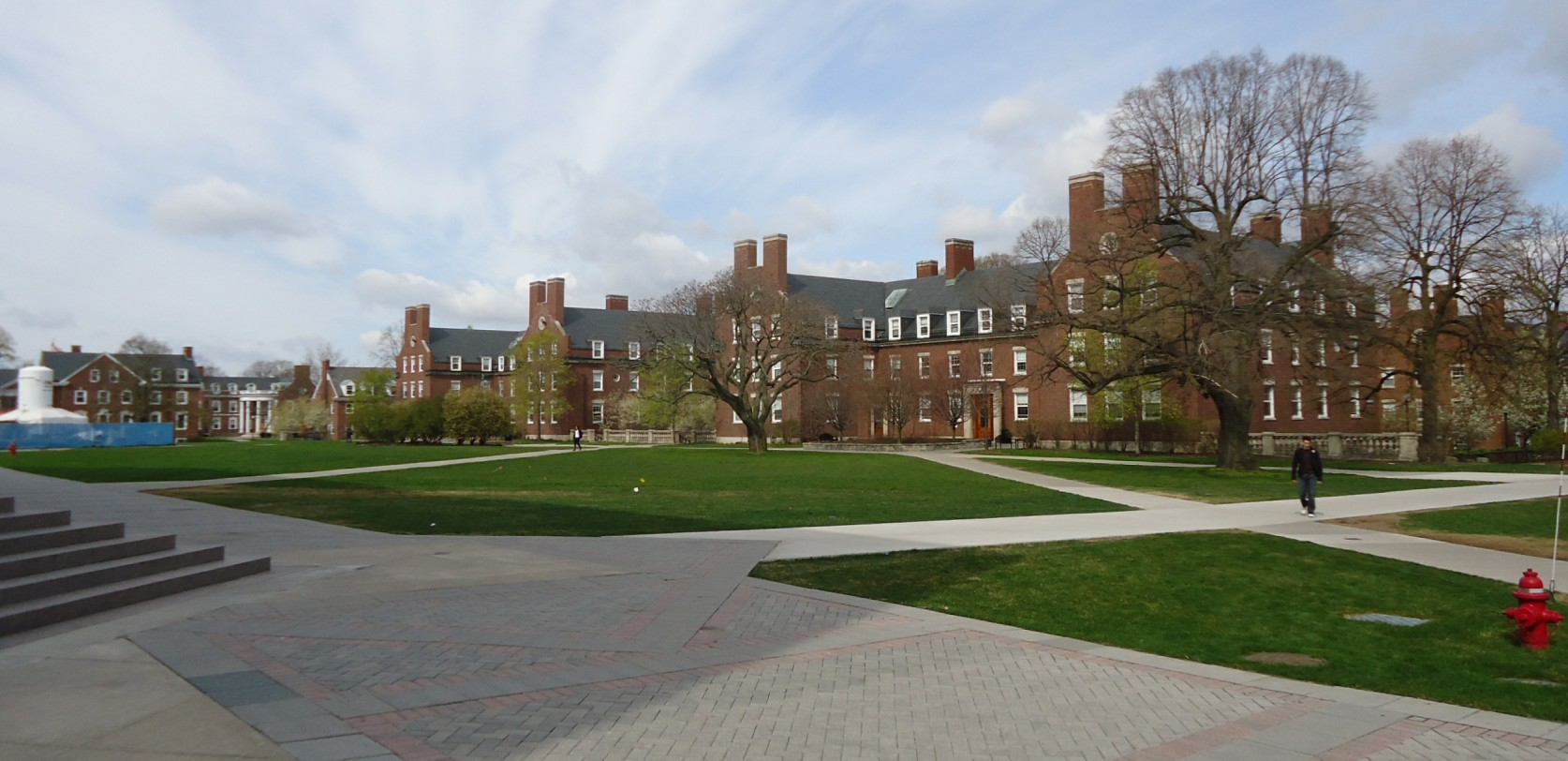
Student dormitories.

- American Sign Language
- Anthropology
- Art & Art History
- Biology
- Brain & Cognitive Sciences
- Center for Visual Science
- Cognitive Science
- Chemistry
- Dance
- Earth & Environmental Science
- Economics
- English
- Film and Media Studies
- Frederick Douglass Institute for African & African American Studies
- Health & Society
- History
- Humanities Center
- Linguistics
- Materials Science
- Mathematics
- Modern Languages & Cultures
- The Arthur Satz Department of Music
- Naval Science
- Neuroscience
- Philosophy
- Physics & Astronomy
- Political Science
- Clinical/Social Psychology
- Religion and Classics
- Russian Studies
- Skalny Center for Polish and Central European Studies
- Statistics
- Susan B. Anthony Institute for Gender and Women's Studies
- Theatre Program
- Wallis Institute of Political Economy

=== Departments in the Hajim School of Engineering and Applied Sciences ===
- Audio and Music Engineering
- Biomedical Engineering
- Chemical Engineering
- Computer Science (Moved from Arts and Sciences in Fall 09)
- Electrical and Computer Engineering
- Mechanical Engineering
- The Institute of Optics
