= Ajoy Ghatak =

Indian physicist

- Born: 9 November 1939 (age 86); Lucknow, United Provinces, British India
- Education: Delhi University; Cornell University
- Known for: Research on photonics, fiber optics and education in India
- Awards: Shanti Swarup Bhatnagar Prize; Optica Fellow; OSA Esther Hoffman Beller Award; ICO Galileo Galilei Medal Award; SPIE educator award Khwarizmi International Award; Dsc (Honoris Causa) from University of Burdwan
- Scientific career
- Fields: Physics, Fibre Optics
- Workplaces: Indian Institute of Technology Delhi; National Academy of Sciences, India
- Thesis: Non linear prompt neutron kinetics in multigroup diffusion theory (1964)
- Doctoral advisor: Mark Nelkin
- Notable students: Anurag Sharma, Sasikanth Manipatruni

Ajoy Kumar Ghatak is an Indian physicist and author of physics textbooks.

Ghatak has written over 170 research papers and more than 20 books. His undergraduate textbook on Optics has been translated to Chinese and Persian and his monograph on Inhomogeneous Optical Waveguides (coauthored with Professor Sodha) has been translated to Chinese and Russian.

In 1995, he was elected Fellow of the Optica (society) "for distinguished service to optics education and for his contribution to the understanding of propagation characteristics of gradient index media, fibers and integrated optical devices".

== Education ==
He received his M.Sc. from Delhi University and Ph.D. from Cornell University.

== Career ==
Ghatak joined the Indian Institute of Technology, Delhi in 1966. He retired as an Emeritus Professor of Physics at IIT Delhi in 2007.

Ghatak served as the President of the National Academy of Sciences, India for the duration 2021 - 2022. He also spends his time writing books and doing special guest lectures at universities and colleges in India and internationally. In recent years, he has taken a keen interest in bringing the genius of Albert Einstein to the wider public and was invited to present a TEDx talk, "Inside Einstein's mind" in 2017.

== Selected awards and honors ==
- Optica (society) Sang Soo Lee Award (2020) "For his seminal role in the development of fiber optics and guided wave photonics and for pioneering optics education in India."
- SPIE Educator Award (2008) "in recognition of outstanding contributions to optics education"
- DSc (Honoris causa) (2007) from University of Burdwan
- Esther Hoffman Beller Medal (2003) of the Optica (society) "for outstanding contributions to optical science and engineering education"
- Galileo Galilei Award (1998) of the International Commission for Optics "for outstanding contributions to the field of optics which are achieved under comparatively unfavorable circumstances"
- S. S. Bhatnagar Prize for Science and Technology – Physical Sciences (1979) of the Council of Scientific and Industrial Research "for significant work in the field of inhomogeneous optical wave-guides, theory of aberrations for optical systems comprising inhomogeneous media and self-focussing of laser beams"

== Selected publications ==
Some publications include:

- Ghatak, Ajoy (2010), Einstein And The Special Theory Of Relativity, Viva Books Private Limited, ISBN 978-81-309-1478-7
- Thyagarajan, K.; Ghatak, Ajoy (2010), Lasers: Fundamentals And Applications (2nd ed.), Springer, ISBN 978-1-4419-6441-0
- Ghatak, Ajoy (2009), Optics (4th ed.), McGraw-Hill Education, ISBN 978-0-07-338048-3
- Ghatak, Ajoy (2009), Basic Quantum Mechanics (with CD), Macmillan Publishers India Limited, ISBN 978-0-230-63916-4
- Lakshminarayanan, Vasudevan; Ghatak, Ajoy; Thyagarajan, K. (2001), Lagrangian Optics, Springer, ISBN 0-7923-7582-3
- Ghatak, Ajoy; Thyagarajan, K. (1998), An Introduction To Fiber Optics, Cambridge University Press, ISBN 0-521-57785-3
- Ghatak, Ajoy (1996), Introduction To Quantum Mechanics, Macmillan India Limited, ISBN 0-333-92419-3
- Ghatak, Ajoy; Thyagarajan, K. (1989), Optical Electronics, Cambridge University Press, ISBN 0-521-30643-4
- Eliezer, Shalom; Ghatak, Ajoy; Hora, Heinrich (1986), Fundamentals Of Equations Of State, World Scientific, ISBN 981-02-4833-4
- Ghatak, Ajoy; Lokanathan, S. (1984), Quantum Mechanics: Theory And Applications, Macmillan Publishers India Limited, ISBN 9781403923417
- Ghatak, Ajoy; Sodha, M. S. (1977), Inhomogeneous Optical Waveguides, Springer, ISBN 0-306-30916-5
