= Robert E. Hopkins =

American physicist

- Born: June 30, 1915; Belmont, MA
- Died: July 4, 2009 (aged 94); Ithaca, NY
- Education: MIT (B.S, 1937); University of Rochester (M.S., 1939) (Ph.D, 1945)
- Awards: US Navy Citation (for outstanding wartime service in the Office of Research and Development); Frederic Ives Medal; Joseph Fraunhofer Award; SPIE Gold Medal (1983)
- Scientific career
- Fields: Physics
- Workplaces: University of Rochester

Robert Earl Hopkins (June 30, 1915 – July 4, 2009) was president of the Optical Society of America in 1973.

Recognized as an expert in optical instrument design, aspheric optics, interferometry, lasers, and lens testing, Hopkins has been characterized as the "father of optical engineering."

== Early life, education and wartime service ==
Born in Belmont, MA, in 1915, Hopkins attended the Massachusetts Institute of Technology (MIT) under a full scholarship, earning a BS in 1937. He received his MS (1939) and PhD (1945) from the University of Rochester (UR). In 1948, he was awarded a US Navy Citation for outstanding wartime service in the Office of Research and Development.

== Career ==
Hopkins was appointed to the UR faculty in 1945 and was named Professor of Optics in 1951. He led the Institute of Optics as Director from 1954 to 1964, during the time when computers were first used to design optical systems and both fiber optics and the laser were born. He travelled frequently to Ithaca to use an early computer at Cornell University and brought the first computers to the UR in 1955. His lens designs included the Todd-AO lens used for the film "Oklahoma!" (1955). In 1963, he organized the "Laser Road Show" for the National Science Foundation to introduce laser technologies at colleges, universities, and corporations.

Hopkins left the UR in 1967 to serve as President of Tropel, Inc., a company he co-founded in 1953. Tropel became a world leader in customized precision optical instrumentation and is now a division of Corning, Inc. He returned to the UR Laboratory of Laser Energetics in 1975 as Chief Optical Engineer, a position he held until 1982. He also continued to teach as Professor of Optics and as Professor Emeritus throughout the 1980s.

=== Organizational affiliations and legacy ===
An OSA member since 1937, Hopkins served as the Society's President in 1973. He was a recipient of OSA's Frederic Ives Medal (1970) and Joseph Fraunhofer Award (1983). He was also a Fellow of the American Physical Society (APS), served on the SPIE Board of Governors, and was a member of Sigma Xi, the American Society for Engineering Education and numerous advisory panels. He was awarded the SPIE Gold Medal in 1983. His career has been celebrated by his students and associates in the Robert E. Hopkins Professor of Optics endowed chair and the Robert E. Hopkins Center for Optical Design and Engineering at the UR.

== Personal life ==
Hopkins was an avid skier for most of his life, a 195 bowler, a competitive horseshoe player in his 70s, and a sometime sailor and golfer. He also loved and respected the natural world and practiced his conservation ethic on the family property known as Wayland.

He was predeceased by his wife of 60 years, Barbara Ann Barnes, and is survived by 6 children and their spouses, 17 grandchildren, and 5 great-grandchildren.

== See also ==
- Optical Society of America § Past Presidents of the OSA
