= Anurag Sharma (physicist) =

Indian physicist (born 1955)

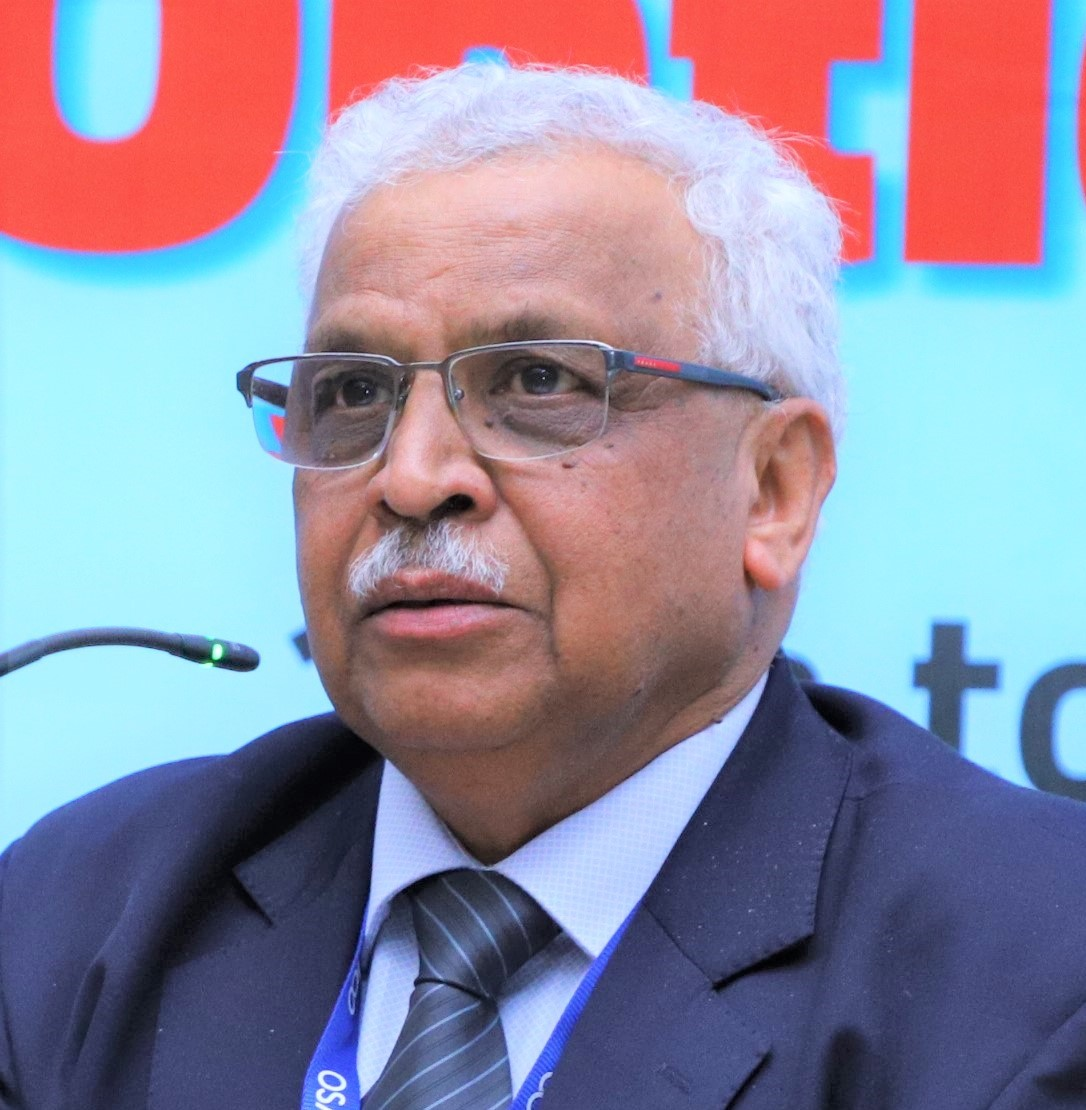
- Born: 7 May 1955 (age 71); Bareilly, Uttar Pradesh, India
- Education: IIT Delhi
- Known for: Studies on optoelectronics and optical communications
- Spouse: Enakshi Khular Sharma
- Awards: 1986 INSA Young Scientist Medal; 1987 IETE S. K. Mitra Memorial Award; 1991 INSA Anil Kumar Bose Memorial Award; 1998 Shanti Swarup Bhatnagar Prize; 1999 UGC Meghnad Saha Award; 2024 Optica's Esther Hoffman Beller Medal
- Scientific career
- Fields: Optical physics; Photonics
- Workplaces: IIT Delhi
- Doctoral advisor: Ajoy Ghatak

Anurag Sharma (born 7 May 1955) is an Indian physicist and a professor at the department of physics of the Indian Institute of Technology Delhi. He is known for his pioneering researches on optoelectronics and optical communications and is an elected fellow of all the three major Indian science academies viz. Indian Academy of Sciences, Indian National Science Academy and National Academy of Sciences, India as well as Indian National Academy of Engineering. The Council of Scientific and Industrial Research, the apex agency of the Government of India for scientific research, awarded him the Shanti Swarup Bhatnagar Prize for Science and Technology, one of the highest Indian science awards for his contributions to Engineering Sciences in 1998. (Note: Long link - please select award year to see details)

== Biography ==
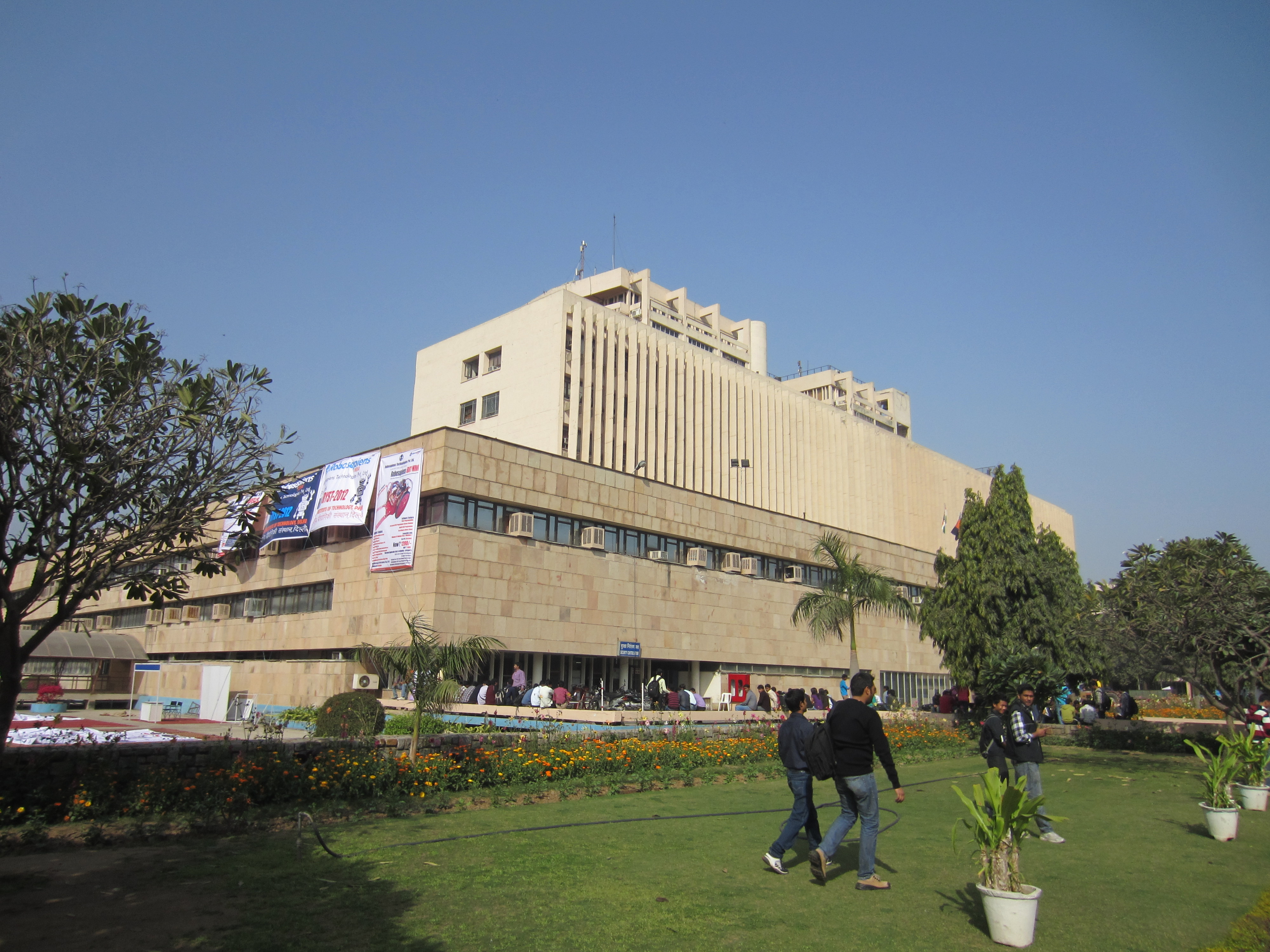
Indian Institute of Technology Delhi, New Delhi

Anurag Sharma, born on 7 May 1955, did his higher studies at the Indian Institute of Technology Delhi (IITD) from where he gained master's degrees in science (MSc) and engineering (MTech) and joined the institute as a member of faculty in 1978, simultaneously pursuing doctoral studies there under the guidance of Ajoy Ghatak. After securing a PhD a year later, he continued his service at IITD but had two sabbaticals; at Technical University of Karlsruhe as an Alexander von Humboldt Fellow during 1982–83 for his post-doctoral work and a short stint as a visiting scientist at CSELT, Turin in 1988. At IITD, has served as the dean of students (2006–2009) and dean of academics (2012–2016) and has been holding the position of a professor at the department of physics since 1995. He is known to have done pioneering research in optoelectronics and optical communications and is credited with the development of analytical and numerical methods for dielectric optical wave guides, single-mode fibers, Graded-Index (GRIN) devices and optical imaging system. He developed a protocol for tracing GRIN media for use in imaging systems as well as for characterizing inhomogeneous media (Note: Developed in 1982) and continues his researches on electromagnetic wave propagation in dielectric media. He has documented his researches in several articles; (Note: Please see Articles section) ResearchGate, an online repository of scientific articles, has listed 58 of them. Besides, he has edited four books viz. Guided Wave Optics: Selected Topics, Understanding Fiber Optics on a PC, International Conference on Fiber Optics and Photonics: Selected Papers from Photonics India '98 (Proceedings of SPIE), Photonics 2010: Tenth International Conference on Fiber Optics and Photonics (Proceedings of SPIE). and Frontiers in Optics and Photonics 2011.

Sharma is a member of the Optical Society of India, served as its vice president during 2008–12 and is the founder general secretary of the Delhi chapter of Optica. He sits in the expert committee on physical sciences of the Fund for Improvement of S&T Infrastructure in Universities and other Higher Educational Institutions (FIST) Program of the Department of Science and Technology He is also associated with Vidya Knowledge Park, an educational initiative based in the National Capital Region of India as a member of their advisory council and is a member of the Technical Advisory Committee of the Indian Institute of Technology Patna. Apart from mentoring a number of students in their doctoral studies, he has delivered many keynote or invited speeches which include International Conference on Fiber Optics and Photonics 2000, South Asian Workshop on Optics & Photonics, "SAWOP-2015", and Workshop on Fiber Optics and Optical Communications (FOCo-2016). On the academic front, he was involved in the re-designing of academic courses at the under-graduate levels at IIT Delhi and it was during his tenure as the dean of academics, the institute introduced alumni participation in institute affairs.

== Awards and honors ==
Sharma received the Young Scientist Medal of the Indian National Science Academy in 1986; INSA would honor him again in 1991 with the Anil Kumar Bose Memorial Award. In between, he received the S. K. Mitra Memorial Award of the Institute of Electrical and Electronics Engineers in 1987. The Council of Scientific and Industrial Research awarded him the Shanti Swarup Bhatnagar Prize, one of the highest Indian science awards in 1998. A year later, he received the 1999 Meghnad Saha Award for Research in Theoretical Sciences of the University Grants Commission of India.

Sharma was selected as an associate of Abdus Salam International Centre for Theoretical Physics in 1988 for a one-year term and for the Homi Bhabha Fellowship by the Homi Bhabha Fellowship Council in 1990, the tenure of the fellowship running until 1992. The National Academy of Sciences, India elected him as a fellow in 1998 and Abdus Salam Centre awarded him the Senior Associate-ship for the term 2001–08. He became an elected fellow of the Indian Academy of Sciences in 2002 and the Indian National Science Academy followed suit in 2004. The same year, the Optical Society of India also elected him as a fellow, followed by the Indian National Academy of Engineering in 2009. He is also a fellow of the Institution of Electronic and Telecommunication Engineers.

In 2024, he was awarded the Esther Hoffman Beller Medal from Optica for his contributions to optics and photonics education, research, leadership, and the establishment of India's first dedicated Optics and Photonics Centre at the Indian Institute of Technology Delhi.

== Personal life ==
Anurag Sharma is married to Enakshi Khular Sharma who was his junior at IIT Delhi. Both of them were students of Ajoy Ghatak. She is a professor at the Department of Electronic Science, University of Delhi.

== Selected bibliography ==
=== Books ===
- Ajoy Ghatak; Anurag Sharma; Ramanand Tewari (1994). Understanding Fiber Optics on a PC. Viva Books Private Limited.
- Anurag Sharma; Banshi Dhar Gupta; Ajoy K. Ghatak (1999). International Conference on Fiber Optics and Photonics: Selected Papers from Photonics India '98 (Proceedings of SPIE). SPIE. ISBN 978-0-8194-3140-0.
- Anurag Sharma (2006). Guided Wave Optics: Selected Topics. Anshan. ISBN 978-1-904798-45-3.
- Sunil K. Khijwania, Banish D. Gupta, Bishnu P. Pal, Anurag Sharma (2011). Photonics 2010: Tenth International Conference on Fiber Optics and Photonics (Proceedings of SPIE). SPIE. p. 572. ISBN 978-0819488008.
- Bishnu Pal, Anurag Sharma, M R Shenoy, Joby Joseph (2012). Frontiers in Optics and Photonics 2011. Viva Books. p. 288. ISBN 9788130919645.

=== Articles ===
- Sharma, Anurag (2001). "Analysis of integrated optical waveguides: variational method and effective-index method with built-in perturbation correction". Journal of the Optical Society of America A. 18 (6): 1383–1387. Bibcode:2001JOSAA..18.1383S. doi:10.1364/JOSAA.18.001383. PMID 11393630.
- Sharma, Anurag; Agrawal, Arti (2006). "Non-paraxial split-step finite-difference method for beam propagation" (PDF). Optical and Quantum Electronics. 38 (1–3): 19–34. Bibcode:2006OQEle..38...19S. doi:10.1007/s11082-006-0019-4. S2CID 53353629.
- Sharma, Anurag; Bhattacharya, Debjani; Agrawal, Arti (2007). "Analytical computation of the propagation matrix for the finite-difference split-step non-paraxial method. Analytical computation of the propagation matrix". Optical and Quantum Electronics. 39 (7): 623–626. Bibcode:2007OQEle..39..623S. doi:10.1007/s11082-007-9114-4. S2CID 118126017.
- Bhattacharya, Debjani; Sharma, Anurag (2008). "Finite difference split step method for non-paraxial semivectorial beam propagation in 3D". Optical and Quantum Electronics. 40 (11–12): 933–942. Bibcode:2008OQEle..40..933B. doi:10.1007/s11082-009-9281-6. S2CID 121044421.
- Barai, S.; Sharma, A. (2009). "Inverse algorithm with built-in spatial filter to obtain the 2-D refractive index profile of optical waveguides from the propagating mode near-field profile". Journal of Lightwave Technology. 27 (11): 1514–1521. Bibcode:2009JLwT...27.1514B. doi:10.1109/JLT.2009.2013482. S2CID 27631772.

== See also ==
- Waveguide (optics)
- Beam propagation method
