= Sun position (air combat) =

The Sun position in aerial combat is the pilot's ability to position the aircraft relative to the Sun in relationship to the position of the enemy aircraft.

The sun position has had different application to different generations of aircraft. During the period when the dogfight dominated air combat, it was used to make visibility and acquisition of own aircraft difficult for the enemy if the Sun was behind own aircraft. With the introduction of infrared homing air-to-air missiles, the use of the Sun by the pilot was used to confuse the missile guidance system.

The advantages of the Sun position were realised early in the history of aerial warfare and is included in the first rule of the Dicta Boelcke.
