= Carlos Stroud =

American physicist

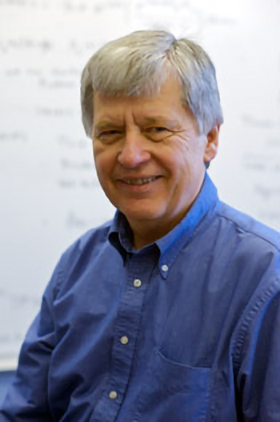
- Carlos Stroud
- Born: July 9, 1942 (age 84); Owensboro, KY
- Education: Centre College; Washington University in St. Louis
- Known for: Single-mode tunable dye lasers Hyperfine structure of atomic sodium Coherent population trapping Electron wave packets Rydberg atomic states Classical limit of quantum mechanics Wave packet revivals and fractional revivals
- Scientific career
- Fields: Theoretical and experimental quantum optics
- Workplaces: University of Rochester
- Thesis: Quantum and Semiclassical Radiation Theory
- Doctoral advisor: Edwin Thompson Jaynes

Carlos Ray Stroud Jr. (born July 9, 1942, in Owensboro, KY) is an American physicist and educator. Working in the field of quantum optics, Stroud has carried out theoretical and experimental studies in most areas of the field from its beginnings in the late 1960s, studying the fundamentals of the quantum mechanics of atoms and light and their interaction. He has authored over 140 peer-reviewed papers and edited seven books. He is a fellow of the American Physical Society and the Optical Society of America, as well as a Distinguished Traveling Lecturer of the Division of Laser Science of the American Physical Society. In this latter position he travels to smaller colleges giving colloquia and public lectures.

== Life and career ==
Carlos Stroud grew up in Kentucky and graduated from Centre College with degrees in mathematics and physics. In 1969 he earned a Ph.D. in physics in Arts and Sciences at Washington University in St. Louis under the mentorship of E. T. Jaynes, with the thesis titled Quantum and Semiclassical Radiation Theory. In 1969 Stroud joined the faculty of The Institute of Optics at the University of Rochester. Over his 50-year career at the University of Rochester, Professor Stroud taught undergraduate and graduate courses in general and quantum physics and optics, while conducting groundbreaking research in several areas of quantum optics, graduating 30 Ph.D.s. He was named professor of optics in 1984 and professor of physics and astronomy in 1991.

In 2004, Stroud collected and edited A Jewel in the Crown: Essays in Honor of the 75th Anniversary of the Institute of Optics, a compilation of 75 essays on the history of the University of Rochester's Institute of Optics (19 of the essays were authored or co-authored by Stroud himself). In 2019, Stroud and Gina Kern co-edited A Jewel in the Crown II: Essays in Honor of the 90th Anniversary of the Institute of Optics. For his contributions in gathering and documenting the Institute of Optics' history, on his retirement on July 1, 2019, Stroud was named professor emeritus of optics and optics historian.

== Professional contributions ==
Soon after joining the faculty of the Institute of Optics at the University of Rochester, Stroud collaborated with Michael Hercher, developing the first single-mode tunable dye laser and using it to study its interaction with sodium atoms in an atomic beam. This work produced a series of groundbreaking experiments, including the study of the hyperfine structure of the D-lines, the isolation of a closed two-level resonance, power broadening, and resonance fluorescence in this system. This first observation of the Mollow sidebands in resonance fluorescence was fundamental to understanding of the nature of quantum correlations in a coherently pumped two-level system. Groups at MIT and the Max Planck Institute in Garching were also racing to be first to observe this spectrum, and did indeed confirm the initial results.

These experimental observations were soon followed by two-laser studies of three-level quantum systems. The first cw study of the Autler–Townes effect, and the first experimental study of the extremely sharp resonance associated with coherent population trapping were made. This observation led to the later development of electromagnetically induced transparency by Harris and others, as well as Stimulated Raman Adiabatic Passage (STIRAP). These pioneering experimental studies were accompanied by theoretical papers providing the underpinning concepts and models, and introducing much of the standard terminology of the fields, including "lambda", "v", and "cascade" for describing three-level configurations, "coherent population trapping" as well as introducing, with Cohen-Tannoudji, the dressed-state basis for resonance fluorescence and Autler-Townes studies.

In a series of some 50 papers from the early 1980s well into the 2000s, Stroud's group studied the production and evolution of spatially localized electron wave packets made up of superpositions of Rydberg atomic states. These states are quite classical in their behavior, travelling several orbits around the nucleus as effectively Keplerian systems, but after a few orbits the packets demonstrate their quantum nature by undergoing decays, revivals and fractional revivals. In a fractional revival the initial wave packet splits into a set of smaller wave packets moving in the classical orbit. Parker and Stroud were the first to predict these fractional revivals, which were then observed by Yeazell and Stroud. This whole series of studies showed how a quantum system could be manipulated in a very controlled fashion to alternatively show classical and quantum features during a complex time evolution. A single electron could be made to interfere with itself to exhibit interference fringes, or to move like a classical localized particle. By the application of Stark fields and THz half-cycle pulses, the electrons could even be made to oscillate, while localized along a linear orbit some 1000 Angstroms in length.

== Selected publications ==
- A Jewel in the Crown, University of Rochester Press, Rochester, NY (2004). (ISBN 978-1580461627)
- A Jewel in the Crown II: Essays in Honor of the 90th Anniversary of the Institute of Optics, Editors G. Kern and C. R. Stroud Jr. (Meliora Press, University of Rochester, August 2019).
- C. R. Stroud Jr. and E. T. Jaynes, Long-term solutions in semiclassical radiation theory, Physical Review A, 1 106–121 (1970). doi:10.1103/PhysRevA.1.106
- C. R. Stroud Jr., Quantum-electrodynamic treatment of spontaneous emission in the presence of an applied field, Physical Review A, 3 1044–1052 (1971). doi:10.1103/PhysRevA.3.1044
- C. R. Stroud Jr., J. H. Eberly, W. L. Lama, and L. Mandel, Superradiant effects in systems of two-level atoms, Physical Review A, 5 1094–1104 (1972). doi:10.1103/PhysRevA.5.1094
- F. Schuda, C. R. Stroud Jr., and M. Hercher, Observation of the resonant stark effect at optical frequencies, Journal of Physics B 7 L198-L202 (1974). doi:10.1088/0022-3700/7/7/002
- R. M. Whitley and C. R. Stroud Jr., Double optical resonance, Physical Review A 14 1498–1513 (1976). doi:10.1103/PhysRevA.14.1498
- H. R. Gray, R. M. Whitley, and C. R. Stroud Jr., Coherent trapping of atomic populations, Optics Letters 3 218–220 (1978). doi:10.1364/OL.3.000218
- H. R. Gray and C. R. Stroud Jr., Autler-Townes effect in double optical resonance, Optics Communications, 25 359–362 (1978). doi:10.1016/0030-4018(78)90146-3
- D. A. Cardimona, M. G. Raymer, and C. R. Stroud Jr., Steady-state quantum interference in resonance fluorescence, Journal of Physics B, 15 55–64 (1982). doi:10.1088/0022-3700/15/1/012
- L. W. Hillman, R. W. Boyd, J. Krasinski, and C. R. Stroud Jr., Observation of a spectral hole due to population oscillations in a homogeneously broadened optical absorption line, Optics Communications, 45 416–419 (1983). doi:10.1016/0030-4018(83)90303-6
- J. Parker and C. R. Stroud Jr., Coherence and decay of Rydberg wave packets, Physical Review Letters, 56 716–719 (1986). doi:10.1103/PhysRevLett.56.716
- J. A. Yeazell and C. R. Stroud Jr., Observation of spatially localized atomic electron wave packets, Physical Review Letters, 60 1494–1497 (1988). doi:10.1103/PhysRevLett.60.1494
- J. A. Yeazell, M. Mallalieu, J. Parker, and C. R. Stroud Jr., Classical periodic motion of atomic-electron wave packets, Physical Review A, 40 5040–5043 (1989). doi:10.1103/PhysRevA.40.5040
- J. A. Yeazell, M. Mallalieu, and C. R. Stroud Jr., Observation of the collapse and revival of a Rydberg electronic wave packet, Physical Review Letters, 64 2007–2010 (1990). doi:10.1103/PhysRevLett.64.2007
- Z. D. Gaeta and C. R. Stroud Jr., Classical and quantum-mechanical dynamics of a quasiclassical state of the hydrogen atom, Physical Review A, 42 6308–6313 (1990). doi:10.1103/PhysRevA.42.6308
- J. A. Yeazell and C. R. Stroud Jr., Observation of fractional revivals in the evolution of a Rydberg atomic wave packet, Physical Review A, 43 5153–5156 (1991). doi:10.1103/PhysRevA.43.5153
- M. W. Noel and C. R. Stroud Jr., Young's double-slit interferometry within an atom, Physical Review Letters, 75 1252–1255 (1995). doi:10.1103/PhysRevLett.75.1252
- M. W. Noel and C. R. Stroud Jr., Excitation of an atomic electron to a coherent superposition of macroscopically distinct states, Physical Review Letters, 77 1913–1916 (1996). doi:10.1103/PhysRevLett.77.1913
- D. L. Aronstein and C. R. Stroud Jr., Fractional wave-function revivals in the infinite square well, Physical Review A, 55 4526–4537 (1997). doi:10.1103/PhysRevA.55.4526
- J. Bromage and C. R. Stroud Jr., Excitation of a three-dimensionally localized atomic electron wave packet, Physical Review Letters, 83 4963–4966 (1999). doi:10.1103/PhysRevLett.83.4963
- S. G. Lukishova, L. J. Bissell, J. Winkler, and C. R. Stroud Jr., Resonance in quantum dot fluorescence in a photonic bandgap liquid crystal host, Optics Letters 37, 1259–1261 (2012). doi:10.1364/OL.37.001259
