= Duncan T. Moore =

American physicist

- Education: University of Rochester M.S., Ph.D University of Maine B.S.
- Awards: Edwin H. Land Medal (2009) SPIE Gold Medal (2006)
- Scientific career
- Fields: Physics
- Workplaces: University of Rochester Stanford University
- Doctoral students: Stephen D. Fantone

Duncan T. Moore was president of the Optical Society of America in 1996 and was awarded the society's Robert E. Hopkins Leadership Award in 2001, the Edwin H. Land Medal in 2009, and was elected as a Fellow member.

Moore is the Rudolf and Hilda Kingslake Professor of Optical Engineering and professor of biomedical engineering, as well as professor of business administration in the William E. Simon Graduate School of Business Administration, and the vice provost for entrepreneurship, all at the University of Rochester. From 2002 until 2004, he served as president and chief executive officer of the Infotonics Technology Center Inc., an industry, academia, and government partnership to foster cutting-edge research, prototyping of new technology, and economic development in Upstate New York, with an operating budget of $15 million and a capital budget of $25 million in 2004. Prior to this, from 1995 until the end of 1997, he served as dean of engineering and applied sciences at the University of Rochester. He also served as president of the Optical Society of America (OSA), a professional organization with more than 12,000 members throughout the world, in 1996.

Moore was confirmed by the U.S. Senate in the fall of 1997 for the position of associate director for technology in The White House Office of Science and Technology Policy (OSTP). In this position, which ended in December 2000, he worked with Neal Francis Lane, President Clinton’s Science Advisor, to advise the President on U.S. technology policy, including the Next Generation Internet, Clean Car Initiative, National Nanotechnology Initiative, ElderTech, and CrimeTech. From January through May 2001, Moore served as Special Advisor to the Acting Director of OSTP.

Since the summer of 2005, Moore has been a consulting professor at Stanford University, where he has worked on its Center for Longevity to create an international, interdisciplinary research and teaching network focused on solving fundamental physical and social problems associated with extended life expectancy.

The PhD degree in optics was awarded to Moore in 1974 from the University of Rochester. He had previously earned a master's degree in optics at Rochester and a bachelor's degree in physics from the University of Maine.

Moore has experience in the academic, research, business, and government arenas of science and technology. He is an expert in gradient-index optics, computer-aided design, and the manufacture of optical systems. He has advised more than 50 graduate thesis students. In 1993, Moore began a one-year appointment as Science Advisor to Senator John D. Rockefeller IV of West Virginia. He also chaired the successful Hubble Independent Optical Review Panel organized in 1990 to determine the correct prescription of the Hubble Space Telescope. He currently chairs the Product-Integrity-Team for the James Webb Space Telescope, the successor to the Hubble Space Telescope. Moore is the founder and former president of Gradient Lens Corporation of Rochester, New York, the manufacturer of the Hawkeye boroscope.

Moore was elected a member of the National Academy of Engineering in February 1998 for the design and fabrication of optical systems and imaging lenses.

== See also ==
- Optical Society of America#Past Presidents of the OSA
