= Robert W. Boyd =

American physicist

Robert Boyd
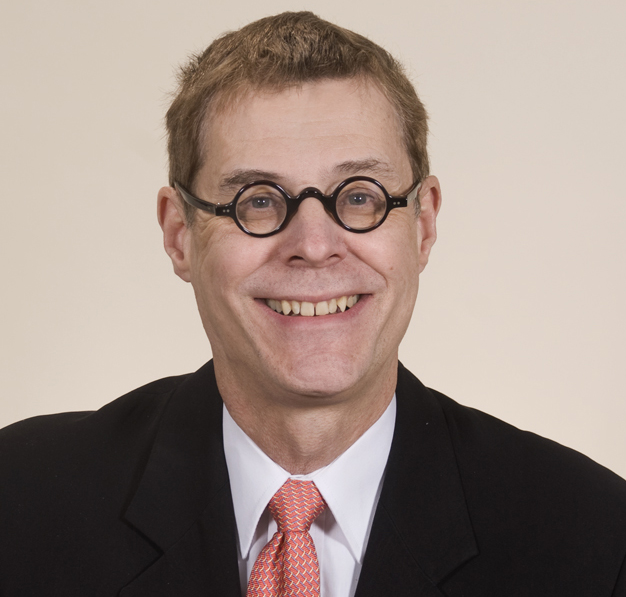
- Boyd in 2010
- Born: Robert William Boyd; March 8, 1948 (age 78); Buffalo, New York, U.S.
- Education: MIT (BS); University of California, Berkeley (PhD)
- Awards: Charles Hard Townes Award (2016); Arthur L. Schawlow Prize in Laser Science (2016); Humboldt Prize (2010); Willis E. Lamb Award (2009)
- Scientific career
- Fields: Physics; Nonlinear optics; Photonics; Optical physics; Nanophotonics; Quantum optics
- Workplaces: University of Rochester; University of Ottawa
- Thesis: An Infrared Upconverter for Astronomical Imaging (1977)
- Doctoral advisor: Charles H. Townes
- Website: www.boydnlo.ca; www.hajim.rochester.edu/optics/sites/boyd/

Robert William Boyd (born 8 March 1948) is an American physicist noted for his work in optical physics and especially in nonlinear optics. He is currently the Canada Excellence Research Chair Laureate in Quantum Nonlinear Optics based at the University of Ottawa, professor of physics cross-appointed to the school of electrical engineering and computer science at the University of Ottawa, and professor of optics and professor of physics at the University of Rochester.

== Education and career ==
Boyd was born in Buffalo, New York. He received a Bachelor of Science degree in physics from the Massachusetts Institute of Technology (MIT) and a Ph.D. in physics from the University of California, Berkeley. His doctoral thesis was supervised by Charles Townes and involves the use of nonlinear optical techniques in infrared detection for astronomy. Boyd joined the faculty of the University of Rochester in 1977, and in 2001 became the M. Parker Givens Professor of Optics and professor of physics. In 2010 he became professor of physics and Canada Excellence Research Chair in quantum nonlinear optics at the University of Ottawa. His research interests include studies of "slow" and "fast" light propagation, quantum imaging techniques, nonlinear optical interactions, studies of the nonlinear optical properties of materials, and the development of photonic devices including photonic biosensors. Boyd has written two books, co-edited two anthologies, published over 500 research papers, and been awarded five patents. He is the 2009 recipient of the Willis E. Lamb Award for Laser Science and Quantum Optics and the 2016 recipient of the Charles H Townes Award. He is a fellow of the American Physical Society (APS), the Optical Society of America (OSA), the Institute of Electrical and Electronics Engineers (IEEE) and SPIE. He has chaired the Division of Laser Science of APS and has been a director of OSA. Boyd has served as a member of the board of editors of Physical Review Letters and of the board of reviewing editors of Science magazine. His h-index is over 100 (according to Google Scholar).

== Research ==
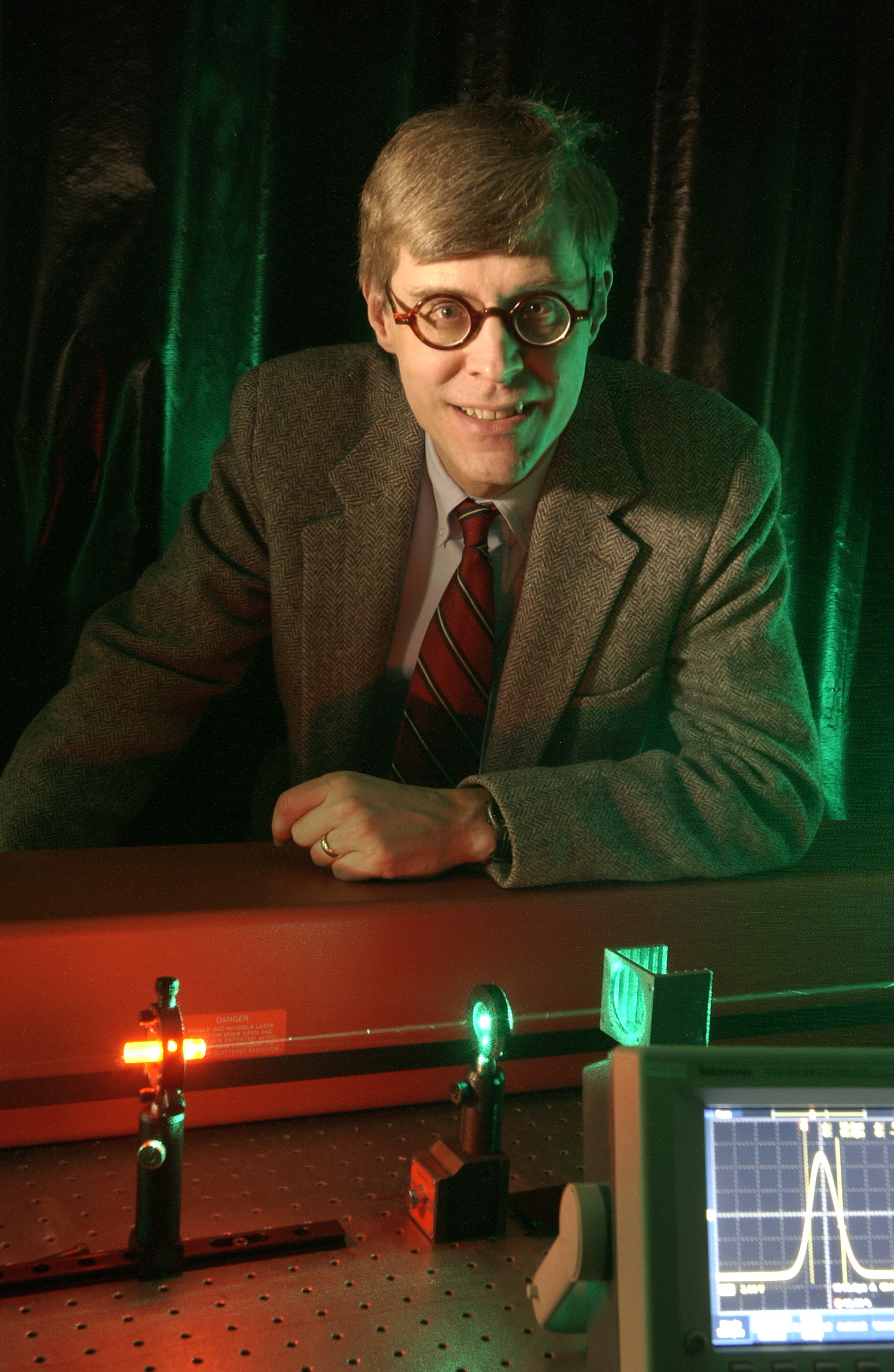
Boyd with his slow light in ruby experiment

Boyd's research interests are in nonlinear optics, photonics, optical physics, nanophotonics, and quantum optics.

=== Slow and fast light ===
Boyd has made significant contributions to the research field known colloquially as slow and fast light. Shortly after the development of great interest in this field in 2000, he realized that it is possible to produce slow and fast-light effects in room-temperature solids. Until that time, most workers had made use of systems of free atoms such as atomic vapors and Bose-Einstein condensates to control the group velocity of light. The realization that slow light effects can be obtained in room temperature solids has allowed the development of many applications of these effects in the field of photonics. In particular, with his students he pioneered the use of coherent population oscillations as a mechanism for producing slow and fast light in room temperature solids. His work has led to an appreciation of the wide variety of exotic effects that can occur in the propagation of light through such structures, including the observation of "backwards" light propagation. Boyd has also been instrumental in developing other slow light methods such as stimulated Brillouin scattering. More recently, he has moved on to the investigation of applications of slow light for buffering and signal regeneration. He also came to the realization that slow light methods can be used to obtain enormous enhancements in the resolution of interferometric spectrometers, and he is currently working on the development of spectrometers based on this principle. As just one indication of the impact of Robert's work on slow and fast light, his Science paper has been cited 1080 times.

=== Quantum imaging ===
Boyd has been instrumental in the creation and development of the field of quantum imaging. This field utilizes quantum features of light, such as squeezing and entanglement, to perform image formation with higher resolution or sensitivity than can be achieved through use of classical light sources. His research contributions in this area have included studies of the nature of position and momentum entanglement, the ability to impress many bits of information onto a single photon, and studies to identify the quantum or classical nature of coincidence imaging. This latter work has led the community to realize that classical correlations can at times be used to mimic effects that appear to be of a quantum origin, but using much simpler laboratory implementations.

=== Local field effects and the measurement of the Lorentz red shift ===
Boyd has performed fundamental studies of the nature of local field effects in optical materials including dense atomic vapors. A key result of this work was the first measurement of the Lorentz red shift, a shift of the atomic absorption line as a consequence of local field effects. This red shift had been predicted by Lorentz in the latter part of the nineteenth century, but had never previously been observed experimentally. In addition to confirming this century-old prediction, this work is significant in confirming the validity of the Lorentz local-field formalism even under conditions associated with the resonance response of atomic vapors.

=== Development of composite nonlinear optical materials ===
Boyd has taken a leading role in exploiting local field effects to tailor the nonlinear optical response of composite optical materials and structures. Along with John Sipe, he predicted that composite materials could possess a nonlinear response exceeding those of their constituents and demonstrated this enhanced nonlinear optical response in materials including nonlinear optical materials, electrooptic materials, and photonic bandgap structures. Similar types of enhancement can occur for fiber and nanofabricated ring-resonator systems, with important applications in photonic switching and sensing of biological pathogens.

=== Foundations of nonlinear optics ===
Boyd has also made contributions to the overall growth of the field of nonlinear optics. Perhaps his single largest contribution has been in terms of his textbook Nonlinear Optics. The book has been commended for its pedagogical clarity. It has become the standard reference work in this area, and thus far has sold over 12,000 copies. Moreover, in the 1980s he performed laboratory and theoretical studies of the role of Rabi oscillations in determining the nature of four-wave mixing processing in strongly driven atomic vapors. This work has had lasting impact on the field with one particular paper having been cited 531 times.

== Awards and honors ==
- Blythe Lecturer, department of physics, University of Toronto, 1987–1988.
- Fellow, Optical Society of America, 1998.
- Fellow, American Physical Society, 2001.
- Herta Leng Memorial Lecture, Rensselaer Polytechnic Institute, April 13, 2005.
- Lecturer in the Frontiers In Spectroscopy series at Ohio State University, January, 2006.
- Research chosen by Discover magazine to be one of the top 100 research stories of 2006 (of which only six were in physics).
- Research described in The New York Times, May 16, 2006.
- Willis E. Lamb Award for Laser Science and Quantum Optics, 2009.
- Humboldt Prize for Physics, 2010.
- Canada Excellence Research Chair in Quantum Nonlinear Optics, 2010.
- Fellow, SPIE, 2014.
- Quantum Electronics Award, IEEE Photonics Society, 2014.
- Honorary doctorate, University of Glasgow, 2014.
- IEEE Photonics Society Distinguished Lecturer, 2015–2016.
- Arthur L. Schawlow Prize in Laser Science, American Physical Society, 2016.
- Charles Hard Townes Award, Optical Society, 2016.
- Fellow of the Royal Society of Canada, 2019.
- Frederic Ives Medal/Jarus W. Quinn Prize, Optica, 2023.

== Publications ==
Boyd's work has been widely published in books and peer-reviewed scientific journals, including Science, Nature, and Physical Review Letters.

=== Books ===
- Radiometry and the Detection of Optical Radiation By R.W. Boyd (1983).
- Optical Instabilities Edited by R.W. Boyd, M. G. Raymer, and L. M. Narducci (1986).
- Nonlinear Optics By R.W. Boyd, Nonlinear Optics (1991, 2002, and 2008).
- Contemporary Nonlinear Optics Edited by G.P. Agrawal and R.W. Boyd (1991).
