= Jannick Rolland =

French-born American optical engineer

- Education: Institut d'optique Graduate School; University of Arizona
- Known for: Co-founder and CEO/CTO of LighTopTech
- Scientific career
- Fields: Optical Engineering; Medical Imaging; Freeform Optics
- Workplaces: University of Rochester (2009 - Present); CREOL University of Central Florida (1996-2008)

Jannick Rolland is the Brian J. Thompson Professor of Optical Engineering at the Institute of Optics at the University of Rochester. She is also the co-founder and CEO/CTO of LighTopTech, a women-owner business founded in 2013 to create medical imaging technologies with biomimetic noninvasive imaging technology. At the University of Rochester, she is the Director of the NSF I/UCRC Center for Freeform Optics (CeFO). She is also the Director of the R.E. Hopkins Center for Optical Design and Engineering that engages undergraduates in optical design, fabrication, and metrology.

== Biography ==
Originally from France, Rolland earned her undergraduate degree from the Institut D'Optique Graduate School (Supoptique) in 1984. She then moved to the United States where she completed MS (1987) and Ph.D. (1990) degrees in [optical science] from the University of Arizona.

Rolland completed her postdoctoral fellowship in the Department of Computer Science at the University of North Carolina at Chapel Hill, where she focused on learning vision and computer graphics while designing stereoscopic head-worn displays for medical visualization. She then served there as Research Assistant Professor and Head of the Vision Group Computer Science. Before joining the Institute of Optics at the University of Rochester in 2009 she was a Professor of Optics, CREOL, the College of Optics and Photonics, University of Central Florida (UCF).

In 2016, Jannick collaborated with the OSA Foundation to honor her late-husband, Dr. Kevin P. Thompson (Group Director, Research and Development/Optics at Synopsys, Inc.) by endowing the Kevin P. Thompson Optical Design Innovator Award. This award is given annually to inspire the next generation of innovators by recognizing significant contributions in lens design, optical engineering, or metrology by an individual researcher at an early stage of their career.

Professor Rolland served on the editorial board of the Journal Presence (MIT Press) (1996-2006), associate editor of Optical Engineering (1999-2004), associate editor of Optics Letters (2016-2022), topical editor of OPTICA (2023-present). She is a fellow of the Optical Society of America, SPIE, and NYSTAR, and a recipient of the 2014 OSA David Richardson Medal and the 2017 Edmund A. Hajim Outstanding Faculty Award. She received the Conrady Award in 2025.

== Awards and honors ==
- 2020, Joseph Fraunhofer Award/ Robert M. Burley Prize, The Optical Society "For numerous creative and innovative applications in several fields of optical engineering including Astronomy, Medical Imaging, Augmented & Virtual Reality, Image Science, and Freeform Optics."
- 2019, Alumnus of the Year, Wyant College of Optical Sciences, The University of Arizona.
- 2017, Outstanding Faculty Award, Edmund A. Hajim Outstanding Faculty Award, University of Rochester.
- 2014, David Richardson Medal, The Optical Society for “For visionary contributions and leadership in optical design and engineering, enabling noninvasive, optical biopsy”.
- 2008, Fellow of SPIE.
- 2004, Fellow of the Optical Society of America for “For contributions to image quality assessment techniques for medical imaging and for optics in virtual environments.”

== Selected publications ==
- Aaron Bauer, Eric M. Schiesser & Jannick P. Rolland (2018). “Starting geometry creation and design method for freeform optics” Nature Communications volume 9, Article number: 1756.
- Kevin P. Thompson, Pablo Benítez, and Jannick P. Rolland, "Freeform Optical Surfaces: Report from OSA’s First Incubator Meeting," Optics & Photonics News 23(9), 32-37 (2012).

== Patents ==
- Freeform nanostructured surface for virtual and augmented reality near eye display
- Cascade Fourier domain optical coherence tomography
- Freeform nanostructure surface for virtual and augmented reality near eye display
- Systems and methods for performing Gabor-domain optical coherence microscopy
- Dynamically focused optical instrument
- Systems and methods for generating a tunable laser beam
- Dynamically focused optical instrument
- Systems and methods for providing compact illumination in head mounted displays
- Systems and methods for generating a tunable laser beam
- Compact optical see-through head-mounted display with occlusion support
- Systems and methods for performing Gabor-domain optical coherence microscopy
- Hybrid display systems and methods
- Systems and methods for designing optical surfaces
- Dynamic focus optical probes
- Differential shack-hartmann curvature sensor
- Imaging systems for eyeglass-based display devices
- Systems and methods for evaluating vessels
- Systems and methods for simulation of organ dynamics
- Differential Shack-Hartmann curvature sensor
- Support structure for head-mounted optical devices
- Head mounted display with eyetracking capability
- Automatic motion modeling of rigid bodies using collision detection
- Compact lens assembly for the teleportal augmented reality system
- Compact lens assembly for the teleportal augmented reality system
- Compact microlenslet arrays imager
- Mobile face capture and image processing system and method
- Head-mounted display by integration of phase-conjugate material
- Head-mounted display by integration of phase-conjugate material
- Head mounted projection display with a wide field of view
- Optical probes for imaging narrow vessels or lumens
- Systems and methods for simulation of organ dynamics
- Imaging systems for eyeglass-based display devices
- Systems and methods for performing simultaneous tomography and spectroscopy
- Systems and methods for providing compact illumination in head mounted displays
