= M. Parker Givens =

- Born: Miles Parker Givens; June 9, 1916; Richmond, Virginia
- Died: January 11, 2013 (aged 96)
- Resting place: Crewe, Virginia
- Education: University of Richmond, Cornell University
- Spouse: Gene M. Givens
- Children: Jean F. Givens, Robert P. Givens, R. Wayne Givens
- Scientific career
- Fields: physical optics
- Institutions: The Institute of Optics at the University of Rochester
- Thesis: The Optical Dispersion of Copper and Beryllium (1942)

Miles Parker Givens (Richmond, Virginia, 9 June 1916 — 11 January 2013) was an American optical physicist, former acting director and professor emeritus at The Institute of Optics at the University of Rochester. His work spanned several topics in physical optics, including holography and photogrammetry. He made important contributions to the development of optical data processing and synthetic holography.

== Career ==
After graduating in 1937 from the University of Richmond, Givens studied physics at Cornell University, with particular focus on the spectroscopy of metal surfaces. He received a doctorate degree from Cornell in 1942.

Between 1942 and 1946, Givens served as instructor of physics at the Pennsylvania State University. He also spent a year with the proximity fuze group of Johns Hopkins Applied Physics Laboratory.

In 1947, Givens became an assistant professor at The Institute of Optics, where he would spend the rest if his career, eventually becoming an emeritus professor there. He served as acting director of the Institute from 1975 to 1977

Although Givens officially retired in 1981 at the mandatory age of 65 (at that time a federal law), he continued to teach for another 22 years, and even served as Acting Dean of the University of Rochester's Hajim School of Engineering and Applied Sciences in 1984-1985. Givens retired for the second time in 2004.

== Personal life ==
M. Parker Givens was born in Richmond, Virginia, on 9 June 1916.

He was married to Gene M. Givens, and together they had a daughter, Jean F. Givens, and two sons, Robert P. Givens and R. Wayne Givens. The family lived in Williamson, New York, about an hour away from the University of Rochester.

Givens died on 11 January 2013, at 96 years of age, having outlived his wife and his two sons — he was survived by Jean F. Givens, his only daughter. He was buried next to his wife, in Crewe, Virginia.

== Legacy ==
While very successful in research, Givens said the main object of his career was helping people to learn.

Givens' doctoral student James C. Wyant and his wife endowed the M. Parker Givens Chair in Optics, in recognition of his success as an inspirational educator. The first recipient of the chair was Robert W. Boyd.
