= Ishwar D. Aggarwal =

- Education: Catholic University of America (PhD, MS)
- Awards: Optica Fellow (2012); National Academy of Inventors Fellow (2024); David Richardson Medal (2011)
- Scientific career
- Fields: Materials science, optics, optical engineering
- Workplaces: University of North Carolina at Charlotte; United States Naval Research Laboratory

Ishwar D. Aggarwal is an American materials scientist and physicist known for his work on infrared optical materials and optical fibers. He is a Professor of Research in Physics and Optical Science at the University of North Carolina at Charlotte. He previously worked at the United States Naval Research Laboratory, where he led research on optical materials. He is a Fellow of Optica and of the National Academy of Inventors.

== Education ==
Aggarwal received a Ph.D. in materials science in 1974 from the Catholic University of America in Washington, D.C. He earned a Master of Science in chemical engineering from the same institution in 1971.

== Career ==
Aggarwal began his career at Corning Glass Works, where he worked on glass and optical-fiber research and development. He later held research and management positions in the optical-technology industry, including serving as vice president for development and engineering at Lasertron, Inc.

In 1986, Aggarwal joined the United States Naval Research Laboratory (NRL) Optical Sciences Division as a research physicist. He later became head of its Optical Materials and Devices Branch and retired from the laboratory in 2011 after 25 years of service.

At NRL, Aggarwal led research on infrared optical materials, optical fibers, high-strength transparent materials and fiber-optic chemical and biological sensors. His research group pioneered the development, application and commercialization of low-loss infrared-transmitting glass fibers and transparent spinel ceramics. The group also developed specialty purification and fiber-manufacturing processes for producing low-loss, high-strength infrared fibers.

In 2011, Aggarwal joined the University of North Carolina at Charlotte as a research professor in physics and optical science. He is also affiliated with the university's Center for Optoelectronics and Optical Communications. At UNC Charlotte, he established the Ultra High Energy Laser Optics program, which supports research on laser components and directed-energy technologies. By 2026, he had been issued 104 United States patents and had authored more than 500 peer-reviewed publications.

In April 2026, Aggarwal and his wife, Shail, committed $2 million to UNC Charlotte to establish an endowed scholarship fund for graduate students in physics and optical science, with priority given to doctoral students. In recognition of his service and the gift, the university renamed the Department of Physics and Optical Science the Ishwar Aggarwal Department of Physics and Optical Science.

== Research ==
Aggarwal's research focuses on optical materials, optical fibers and devices for transmitting, generating and detecting infrared radiation. His work includes glass compositions, transparent ceramics, laser materials, optical sensors and antireflective surfaces.

=== Optical fibers and infrared sources ===
At Corning Glass Works, Aggarwal developed a silica-based glass composition containing germanium dioxide and phosphorus pentoxide for optical-fiber cores. His subsequent research at the United States Naval Research Laboratory included fluoride and chalcogenide glasses for infrared transmission. Working with colleagues, he investigated the effects of impurities and scattering on optical losses and developed methods for purifying glasses and fabricating fibers with a glass core and cladding.

His inventions in this area include processes for removing hydrogen and carbon impurities from glasses, manufacturing infrared fibers and protecting fiber terminations. These developments were investigated for applications in infrared spectroscopy, chemical sensing and laser-power delivery. Infrared-fiber technologies developed by Aggarwal and his collaborators were licensed to IRFlex and CorActive.

Aggarwal also contributed to research on rare-earth-doped glass fibers, optical amplifiers and photonic-crystal fibers. His work with collaborators includes infrared fiber lasers and supercontinuum sources, which produce light across a broad range of wavelengths. He also contributed to the development and patenting of an infrared fiber-based missile-warning and protection system for aircraft.

=== Transparent ceramics and laser materials ===
Aggarwal and his colleagues developed transparent magnesium aluminate spinel ceramics for optical windows, protective domes and transparent armor. Their research examined methods for reducing optical absorption and scattering while producing components for use in demanding environments. Related inventions include processes for coating ceramic powders with sintering aids, forming transparent spinel and joining ceramic components. Spinel technologies were licensed to MER Corporation and CoorsTek.

His research also includes rare-earth-doped polycrystalline ceramics used as laser gain media, including yttrium oxide and yttrium aluminium garnet. He co-invented methods for preparing ceramic powders and producing transparent laser ceramics through hot pressing. This work addressed materials for high-power laser systems.

=== Chemical and biomedical sensing ===
Aggarwal has investigated infrared optical sensing for detecting hazardous chemicals, characterizing environmental contamination and analyzing biological tissue. His inventions with collaborators include a selective fiber-optic chemical sensor, an infrared fiber-optic cone penetrometer system for subsurface characterization, and a method for tissue analysis using evanescent-wave spectroscopy.

He also collaborated on sensing systems inspired by human color vision. This research uses optical filters to distinguish chemicals through their infrared absorption characteristics and includes a patented method for identifying substances with overlapping spectral signatures. The approach has been investigated for detecting chemical vapors and explosive materials. Related sensing technologies were licensed for tissue diagnostics and greenhouse-gas detection.

=== Antireflective surfaces and thin-film materials ===
At the University of North Carolina at Charlotte, Aggarwal has worked on microscopic and nanoscale surface structures designed to reduce reflection from optical materials. His research with collaborators includes antireflective structures on glass, transparent ceramics and optical-fiber ends. These studies have examined light transmission, resistance to laser-induced damage and performance under environmental exposure. Related inventions include methods for directly structuring fiber ends and using etch masks to form antireflective surfaces.

Aggarwal has also contributed to the development of infrared-transparent electrical conductors and thin-film photovoltaic materials. His inventions with colleagues include barium copper sulfur fluoride conductive materials and methods for preparing copper indium gallium selenide films with controlled composition.

== Honors and awards ==
- 1998 – Sigma Xi Award for Applied Science
- 2004, 2006 – Alan Berman Publication Award
- 2006, 2007 – Thomas A. Edison Patent Award
- 2007 – Mid-Atlantic Region Award for Excellence in Technology Transfer, Federal Laboratory Consortium
- 2008 – National Award for Excellence in Technology Transfer, Federal Laboratory Consortium
- 2011 – David Richardson Medal, Optical Society
- 2012 – Arthur E. Bisson Prize for Naval Technology Achievement Award, Office of Naval Research
- 2012 – Optica Fellow
- 2024 – Fellow, National Academy of Inventors
- 2024 – Inaugural Million Dollar Circle, University of North Carolina at Charlotte
- 2026 – Nominated for induction into the National Inventors Hall of Fame

== Books ==
- Aggarwal, I. D.; Lu, G. (eds.) (1991). Fluoride Glass Fiber Optics. London: Academic Press.
- Sanghera, J. S.; Aggarwal, I. D. (eds.) (1998). Infrared Transmitting Fiber Optics. Boca Raton, Florida: CRC Press.

== Selected publications ==
- Sanghera JS, Aggarwal ID (1999). "Active and passive chalcogenide glass optical fibers for IR applications: a review". Journal of Non-Crystalline Solids. 256–257: 6–16. doi:10.1016/S0022-3093(99)00484-6.
- Lenz G, Zimmermann J, Katsufuji T, Lines ME, Hwang HY, Spälter S, Slusher RE, Cheong SW, Sanghera JS, Aggarwal ID (2000). "Large Kerr effect in bulk Se-based chalcogenide glasses". Optics Letters. 25 (4): 254–256. doi:10.1364/OL.25.000254.
- Shaw LB, Cole B, Thielen PA, Sanghera JS, Aggarwal ID (2001). "Mid-wave IR and long-wave IR laser potential of rare-earth doped chalcogenide glass fiber". IEEE Journal of Quantum Electronics. 37 (9): 1127–1137. doi:10.1109/3.945317.
- Harbold JM, Ilday FÖ, Wise FW, Sanghera JS, Nguyen VQ, Shaw LB, Aggarwal ID (2002). "Highly nonlinear As–S–Se glasses for all-optical switching". Optics Letters. 27 (2): 119–121. doi:10.1364/OL.27.000119.
- Slusher RE, Lenz G, Hodelin J, Sanghera J, Shaw LB, Aggarwal ID (2004). "Large Raman gain and nonlinear phase shifts in high-purity As_{2}Se_{3} chalcogenide fibers". Journal of the Optical Society of America B. 21 (6): 1146–1155. doi:10.1364/JOSAB.21.001146.
- Sanghera JS, Shaw LB, Aggarwal ID (2009). "Chalcogenide Glass-Fiber-Based Mid-IR Sources and Applications". IEEE Journal of Selected Topics in Quantum Electronics. 15 (1): 114–119. doi:10.1109/JSTQE.2008.2010245.
