= Kingslake =

Kingslake is a surname. Notable people with the surname include:

- Hilda Conrady Kingslake (1902–2003), English-American researcher in the field of optics
- Rudolf Kingslake (1903–2003), English academic, lens designer, and engineer
