= SPIE Gold Medal =

SPIE Gold Medal, or Gold Medal Award of SPIE, is the highest honor of SPIE (the international society for optics and photonics), and is considered one of the highest award in the fields of photonic and optical engineering and related instrumental sciences. The Gold Medal started awarding annually since 1977, and the award includes a medal and $10,000 cash award.

== Past awardees ==
- 1977: John Donovan Strong
- 1978: James G. Baker
- 1979: Edwin H. Land
- 1980: Rudolf Kingslake
- 1981: Harold E. Edgerton
- 1982: Harold H. Hopkins
- 1983: Robert E. Hopkins
- 1984: Franke Cooke
- 1985: Warren J. Smith
- 1986: Brian J. Thompson
- 1987: H. Angus Macleod
- 1988: Andrew Tescher
- 1989: Andre Marechal
- 1990: Emmett N. Leith
- 1991: William F. Schreiber
- 1992: Charles K. Kao
- 1993: Alfred H. Sommer
- 1994: Andrei L. Mikaelian
- 1995: Georges Nomarski
- 1996: Robert R. Shannon
- 1997: Marjorie Meinel and Aden Meinel
- 1998: Thomas I. Harris
- 1999: William L. Wolfe
- 2000: Robert E. Fischer
- 2001: Parameswaran Hariharan
- 2002: Zhores I. Alferov
- 2003: James C. Wyant
- 2004: Roland V. Shack
- 2005: H. John Caulfield
- 2006: Duncan T. Moore
- 2007: Joseph W. Goodman
- 2008: M. J. Soileau
- 2009: Richard B. Hoover
- 2010: Charles H. Townes
- 2011: Harrison Hooker Barrett
- 2012: Daniel Malacara Hernandez
- 2013: Federico Capasso
- 2014: James Harrington
- 2015: Nader Engheta
- 2016: Paras N. Prasad
- 2017: Katarina Svanberg
- 2018: Paul Corkum
- 2019: Robert Alfano
- 2020: Ursula Keller
- 2021: Hugo Thienpont
- 2022: Michael Berns
- 2023: Graham Reed
- 2024: Akhlesh Lakhtakia
- 2025: Halina Rubinsztein-Dunlop

== See also ==
- List of engineering awards
