= William Shurcliff =

American physicist (1909-2006)

William Asahel Shurcliff
- Born: March 27, 1909; Massachusetts, United States
- Died: June 20, 2006 (aged 97); Cambridge, Massachusetts
- Education: Harvard University (BS), (PhD)
- Known for: Work on the Manhattan Project, Polarised Light, Solar Energy Architecture
- Scientific career
- Fields: Physics
- Workplaces: Polaroid Corporation Harvard University Office of Scientific Research and Development
- Thesis: The Band Spectrum of Carbon Monosulphide.

William Asahel Shurcliff (March 27, 1909 – June 20, 2006) was an American physicist. He published on polarized light and passive solar building designs. An expert on patent application, he served the government during World War II and later with Polaroid Corporation. He was an outspoken critic of supersonic transport in the 1960s and of Ronald Reagan's Strategic Defense Initiative in the 1980s.

== Early life and education ==
Shurcliff was the son of landscape architect Arthur Asahel Shurcliff and Margaret Homer Shurcliff (née Nichols). He received his BA cum laude in 1930, a PhD in physics in 1934, and a degree in business administration in 1935, all from Harvard University.

== Career ==
After Harvard, Shurcliff worked as head of the Spectrophotometric Laboratory at the Calco Chemical Division of the American Cyanamid Company. In this role, he was responsible for Calco’s patent records.

=== Atomic bomb ===
==== Patent Censor ====
In 1942 he joined the staff of the Office of Scientific Research and Development, where he worked in the Liaison Office, processing technical information obtained from overseas and routing it to divisions within US government research where it could be useful. In May 1942 he was chosen by his boss, Vannevar Bush, to be part of S-1 Section, which would become the Manhattan Project to make the atomic bomb.

Shurcliff's role was specifically to be a censor of patents: he would review patent applications from the private sector which appeared to impinge on topics being developed in secret by the government, and put them under temporary secrecy orders. This was "a secret job that involved a comprehensive look at the atomic energy project."

In the context of the wartime standing of the nation, the fear was that private researchers could endanger the security of the U.S. atomic program, as physicists like French émigré Frédéric Joliot-Curie attempted to file nuclear reactor–related patent applications in multiple countries. Any patent applications “which have any significance” to the nascent bomb were to be "withheld from issue."

Shurcliff's job was to "locate, examine, and make secret all non-gov’t-controlled U.S. patent applications related to S-1 (the atomic bomb)."

Through October 1944, he "put to sleep" (as Shurcliff put it) at least 131 patent applications from 95 separate inventors.

==== U.S. Government "Historian" ====
He later served as an assistant to Richard Tolman, another physicist working on the Manhattan Project, helping to copyedit the Smyth Report, the first official declassified history of the Manhattan Project. In 1946, he serve as the official historian to Operation Crossroads, the first postwar nuclear test series. In this capacity, in July of that year, he witnessed the "detonation of two 23-kiloton bombs at Bikini Atoll in the South Pacific," an event that was to radically alter his perception of his work in the field. One of his sons has been quoted as saying, "the rest of his life was a sort of atonement.''

=== Transition to corporate work ===
Returning to the east coast, Shurcliffe headed up the optics laboratory at the Polaroid Corporation, a company run by Harvard classmate Edwin H. Land. At Polaroid Shurcliff earned "more than 20 patents and refined the automatic-focus slide projector."

==== Polarized light ====
In 1962 Harvard University Press published his Polarized Light: Production and Use which made an extensive review of the subject and included thirty pages of ennumerative bibliography. Two years later The Commission on College Physics teamed Shurcliff with Stanley S. Ballard to write a text on polarized light suitable for college study. The bibliography was reduced to a single page and a reviewer noted the "straightforward, conversational style" and that "The treatment is mostly nonmathematical but touches on electromagnetic theory, the Poincaré sphere, Stokes vectors and Mueller matrices with great clarity." The bibliography was later republished in an anthology.

=== Passive solar building design ===
In the 1970s and 1980s, he became an advocate for passive solar building design and superinsulation.

== Opposition Initiatives ==
Shurcliff, in his later years, became widely known for his activist activities in a role not based on his professional bona fides as "a physicist at Harvard and a veteran of the Manhattan Project," but simply as a concerned citizen. "Among Shurcliff’s greatest assets was his ability to distill complex scientific and technical arguments into ordinary language, which he did with remarkable industry, turning out scores of newsletters, press releases, and fact sheets." He was further respected for his sardonic humor, as with his letter to Science magazine of November 1965 (reprinted 1983), where, signing as "Underwater Consultant, CECU," he proposed a harborside floating nuclear accelerator, fitted with a "5-hp outboard motor tangentially at the outer edge of the platform and [to] keep the motor running continuously, so as to rotate the entire accelerator at the rate of one revolution per week and thus distribute the radiation uniformly along the entire harbor-front." These qualities made for memorable writing, serving to magnify his impact as an organizer and activist.

=== Opposition to supersonic transport (SST) ===
He played an outspoken role in defeating plans for a supersonic passenger plane in the 1960s, while working as a senior research associate at the Cambridge Electron Accelerator.

In this role, Shurcliff co-founded the Citizens' League Against the Sonic Boom, and was a member of the advisory committee to the Anti-Concorde Project. Many consider that Shurcliff, "as much as anyone in the United States," deserved the credit for "making it politically impossible to fly SST's over populated areas."

Alongside Sen. William Proxmire and environmentalists of the period like David Brower, Shurcliff employed his "impeccable credibility, a gentle disposition and a succinct way with words" to highlight the "bang zone" of shock waves that rolled out "like a carpet for up to 80 kilometres" in the trail of supersonic jets. With a blanket of public writings and presentations, he successfully challenged "the validity of government and scientific reports that seemed to play down the noise nuisance and dollar damage caused by the supersonic craft."

=== Shurcliff v. "Star Wars" ===
In 1986, he took on the Strategic Defense Initiative, a missile-based system of defense proposed by President Ronald Reagan that came to be known as "Star Wars".

Shurcliff polled his fellow members of the National Academy of Sciences with a survey that made it clear in the opening sentence of his cover letter "that he considered Strategic Defense Initiative doomed to failure, and that he intended to use the results of the poll to persuade Congress to curtail the program." Only 20 of the 505 respondents responded favorably.

== Personal life ==
In 1941 Shurcliff married Joan Hopkinson Shurcliff, a daughter of Massachusetts painter Charles Hopkinson. The family initially lived in Washington, D.C., until moving to back to a home constructed on the family plat in Ipswich, Massachusetts, later adding a second home in Cambridge, Massachusetts, convenient to Polaroid and Harvard University. They had two sons, Arthur Shurcliff of Richmond, Virginia, and Charles Shurcliff, a noted painter of New England shore life.

== Bibliography ==
- 1947: Bombs at Bikini: the official report of Operation Crossroads, W. H. Wise via Biodiversity Heritage Library
- 1955: "Haidinger's Brushes and Circularly Polarized Light", Journal of the Optical Society of America 45(5):399.
- 1962: Polarized Light: Production and Use via Internet Archive
- 1964: (with Stanley S. Ballard) Polarized Light, Van Nostrand Momentum Book (for the Commission on College Physics)
- 1970: SST and Sonic Boom Handbook, Ballantine Books.
- 1978: Solar Heated Buildings of North America: 120 Outstanding Examples, Brick House Publishing.
- 1979: New Inventions in Low Cost Solar Heating: 100 Daring Schemes Tried and Untried, Brick House Publishing.
- 1980: Thermal Shutters and Shades: Over 100 Schemes for Reducing Heat-Loss Through Windows, Brick House Publishing.
- 1981: Super Insulated Houses and Double Envelope Houses: A Survey of Principles and Practice, Brick House Publishing.
- 1983: Super Solar Houses: Saunder's 100% Solar, Low-Cost Designs, with Norman Saunders, Brick House Publishing.
