= Martin Summerfield =

American physicist and rocket scientist

- Born: October 20, 1916; Brooklyn
- Died: July 18, 1996 (aged 79); Hightstown, New Jersey
- Education: Brooklyn College; California Institute of Technology
- Scientific career
- Fields: Aerospace; Combustion
- Workplaces: Jet Propulsion Laboratory; Princeton University
- Doctoral advisor: John D. Strong
- Doctoral students: Herman Krier

Martin Summerfield (20 October 1916 – 18 July 1996) was an American physicist and rocket scientist, a co-founder of Aerojet, head of Princeton University propulsion and combustion laboratory.

== Life and career ==
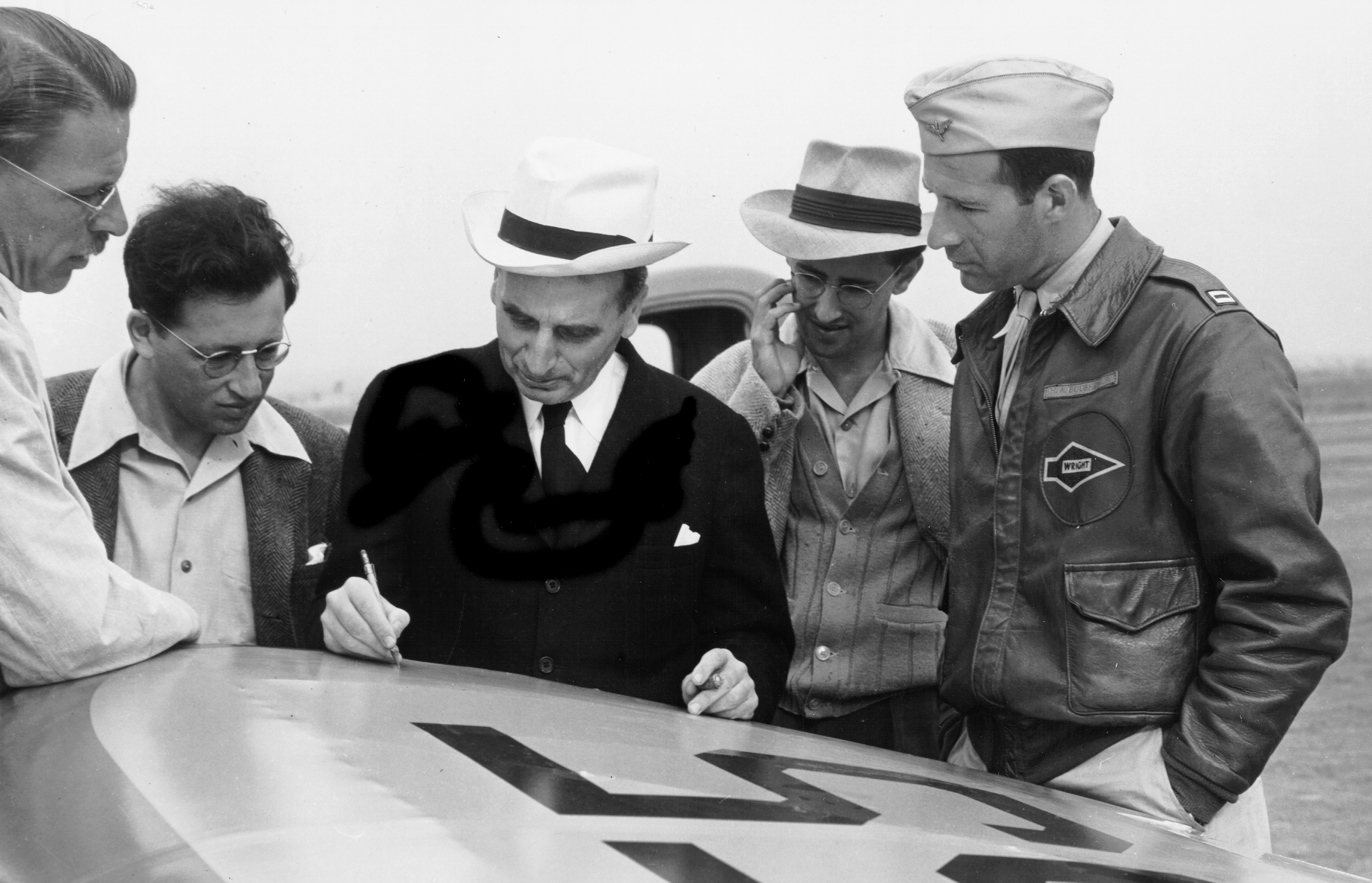
Martin Summerfield (second from left) with Theodore von Kármán (center)

Summerfield received B.S. degree in physics from Brooklyn College. He received his M.S. and Ph.D. degrees at the California Institute of Technology in 1937 and 1941, respectively. He was elected as a member of the National Academy of Engineering in 1979.
