= James Kafka =

American physicist and inventor

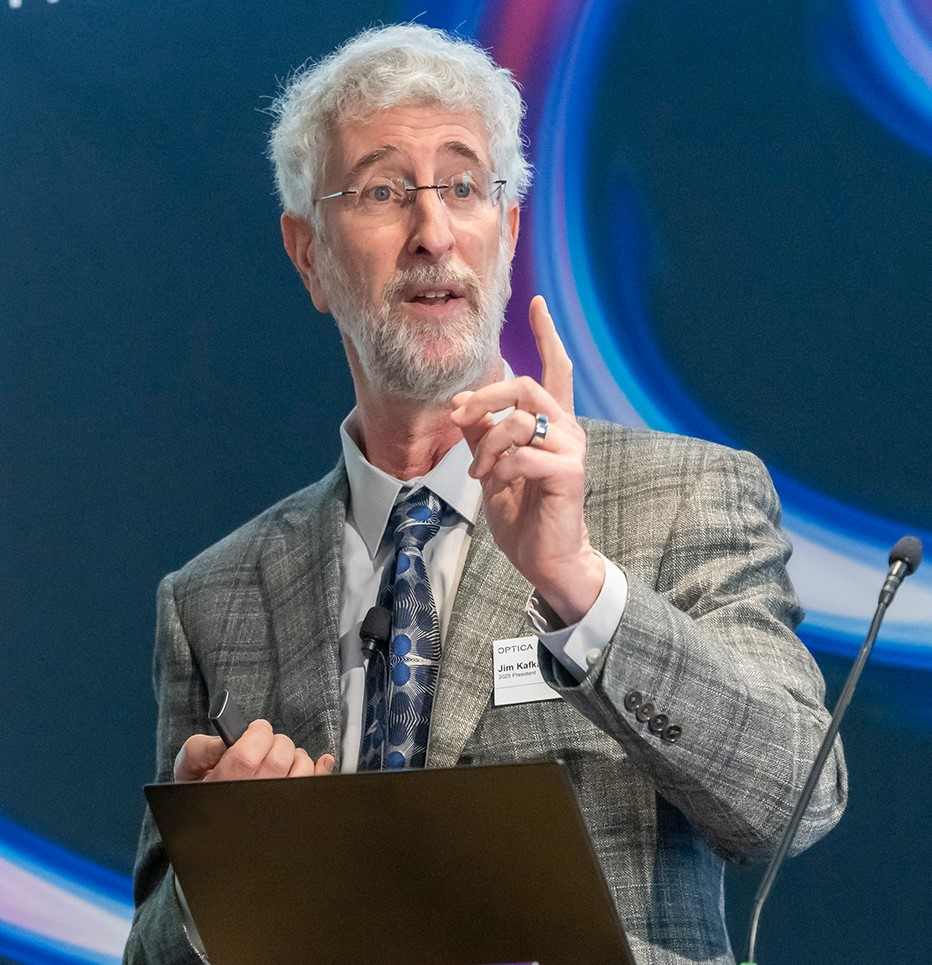
- Education: Institute of Optics at the University of Rochester
- Known for: Inventing laser systems
- Awards: Thermo Electron Corporate Award for Technical Innovation Newport Corporation Strategic Patent Award
- Scientific career
- Fields: Laser science Optics
- Workplaces: Spectra-Physics MKS Instruments

James Kafka (January 27, 1956) is an American physicist and inventor in optics. He is an Emeritus Fellow at MKS Instruments and Spectra-Physics Lasers, where he has designed picosecond lasers and femtosecond lasers.

Kafka served as the President of Optica in 2025.

== Education ==
Kafka received a Bachelor of Science and PhD. in optics from the Institute of Optics at the University of Rochester in 1977 and 1983.

After completing his education with the University of Rochester in 1983, Kafka joined Spectra-Physics Lasers as a senior scientist and eventually assumed the position of chief technology officer at the company.

== Research and career ==
At Spectra-Physics, Kafka designed various lasers for use in industrial and research applications, including physical chemistry, high energy physics, optoelectronics, and related fields in optics. His inventions include a high-power mode-locked laser system, a high-power ytterbium-doped calcium fluoride laser system, and a regenerative amplifier system, among other laser technologies.

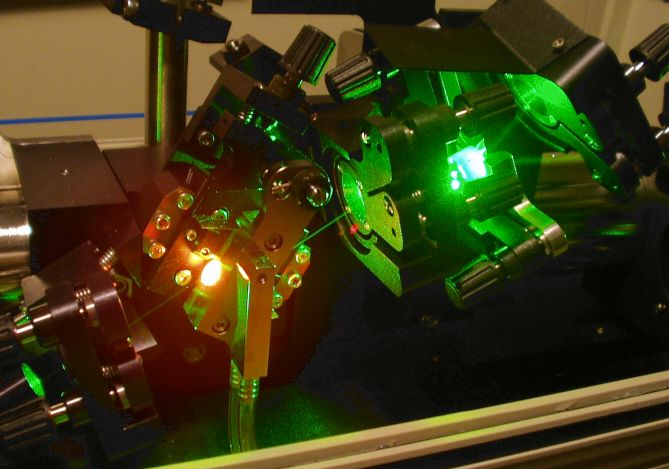
An example of the Spectra Physics Tsunami, developed in 1990. The bright red light on the left is the Ti:sapphire crystal; the bright green light is scattered pump light from a mirror. The image was taken at Lund University (Sweden), October 2004.

In 1990, Kafka introduced the Tsunami, the first commercial ultrafast Ti: sapphire laser, which allows for spectral outputs ranging from ultra-narrow single frequencies to wide bandwidths over several hundred nanometers.

In 1997, Kafka designed the first diode-pumped double-clad fiber laser, consisting of a single-mode optical fiber core that is pumped by a high-power coherent laser diode source.

Additionally, Kafka developed the first commercial 10W solid-state green laser in 1997 and the first broadly tunable ultrafast source for microscopy in 2011.

First joining Optica in 1976 as an undergraduate student, he was named an Optica Fellow in 2005 for his contributions to ultrafast optics and optical engineering. His contributions to the professional association include a tenure as the Ultrafast Topical Editor for the Journal of the Optical Society of America from 1994 to 1995, service as a co-chair for the Conference on Laser and Electro-Optics and Advanced Solid-State Photonics conferences, and lecturer at student-focused events.

From 1999 to 2017, he acted as a distinguished traveling lecturer in laser science for the American Physical Society, where he has volunteered to meet with universities internationally to promote optics studies.

== Volunteer work ==
Kafka volunteers with various academic and industrial institutions to deliver public lectures and engage with students and faculty to advocate for education in laser science.

His engagement activities include supporting events such as the University of Central Florida College of Optics and Photonics Industrial Affiliates Symposium, the Stanford University Photonics Retreat, the Siegman International School on Lasers.

== Awards and honors ==
- 2002: Thermo Electron Corporate Award for Technical Innovation
- 2005: Optica Fellow
- 2007: Newport Corporation Strategic Patent Award
- 2023: Photonics 100

== Selected publications ==
Simon Lefrançois, Khanh Kieu, Yujun Deng, James D. Kafka, and Frank W. Wise, "Scaling of dissipative soliton fiber lasers to megawatt peak powers by use of large-area photonic crystal fiber," Opt. Lett. 35, 1569-1571 (2010). https://doi.org/10.1364/OL.35.001569

Klein, J., Kafka, J. The flexible research tool. Nature Photon 4, 289 (2010). https://doi.org/10.1038/nphoton.2010.108

J. D. Kafka and T. M. Baer, "Peak power fluctuations in optical pulse compression," in IEEE Journal of Quantum Electronics, vol. 24, no. 2, pp. 341–350, Feb. 1988, doi:10.1109/3.131.
