= Advances in Optics and Photonics =

- Discipline: Optics, photonics
- Language: English
- Edited by: Guifang Li

Publication details
- History: 2009–present
- Publisher: Optica
- Frequency: Monthly
- Impact factor: 23.8 (2024)

Standard abbreviations
- ISO 4: Adv. Opt. Photonics

Indexing
- CODEN: AOPAC7
- ISSN: 1943-8206
- LCCN: 2008203929
- OCLC no.: 723946230

Links
- Journal homepage; Online access; Online archive

Advances in Optics and Photonics is a monthly peer-reviewed scientific journal published by Optica. It covers review articles and multimedia tutorials on significant advances in optics and photonics. Its editor-in-chief is Guifang Li (University of Central Florida).

According to the Journal Citation Reports, the journal has a 2023 impact factor of 25.2.
