= Delwin Lindsey =

American biopsychologist

Delwin T. Lindsey is an American psychologist who got his degree in physics from Pomona College following by a Ph.D. in biopsychology from the University of Chicago where he currently teaches evolutionary psychology and its history. He is a member of Vision Sciences Society and the Optical Society of America in which he also works as an editor of its journal.
