= Wilbur B. Rayton =

American lens designer (1884–1946)

- Born: 1884
- Died: 1946 (aged 61–62)
- Known for: President of the Optical Society of America from 1933–34 Member of the Society of Motion Picture and Television Engineers
- Scientific career
- Fields: Physics
- Institutions: Bausch & Lomb, Institute of Optics at the University of Rochester

Wilbur B. Rayton was president of the Optical Society of America from 1933–34.

Born in 1884, Wilbur Rayton was a charter member of Optical Society of America. He spent his career as a member of the Bausch & Lomb staff but also taught at the University of Rochester's Institute of Optics from 1929–1931.

In 1926, he served on a committee (along with T.R. Wilkins of the University of Rochester and Loyd A. Jones of Eastman Kodak) that outlined possible courses to be offered in the proposed new Institute of Optics. He was also active in the Society of Motion Picture and Television Engineers, and designed cameras for that organization. In 1926, he developed a petrographic microscope.

Rayton's lens design skill did much to advance astronomical observation. He specialized in designing objectives for high-speed cameras for astronomical spectrographs. In 1937 Rayton designed a lens that was described as the "world's fastest". Its speed was f:0.59—6.5 times faster than the f:1.5 lenses used in minicameras of the day. Astronomer Milton Humason used Rayton's lens to observe star clusters beyond the Milky Way Galaxy. The lens cut the time it took to make spectrographic readings of remote objects in half.

When the Journal of the Optical Society of America began publication in 1917, Rayton published an article in the very first volume on reflected images in spectacle lenses. In all, he published five articles in JOSA, including one that described the needs of the criteria of optical glass for the budding U.S. optics industry.

Rayton died in 1946.

== See also ==
- Optical Society of America#Past Presidents of the OSA
