= Katarina Svanberg =

Swedish scientist (born 1944)

- Born: December 11, 1944 (age 81); Falköping
- Education: University of Gothenburg; Lund University
- Scientific career
- Workplaces: Skane University Hospital
- Thesis: The interaction of laser light with tissue : fluorescence diagnosis of tumours and atherosclerotic lesions and photochemical treatment (1989)

Katarina Svanberg (born December 11, 1944) is a Swedish physician who is Professor and Chief Consultant of Oncology at the Skåne University Hospital. Her research considers the use of fluorescence-based tumour imaging and photodynamic therapy. She served as President of SPIE in 2011 and was awarded the SPIE Gold Medal in 2017.

== Early life and education ==
Svanberg was born in Falköping and grew up in Mariestad. Her parents had both grown up without much money, and lost their brothers and sisters because they did not have access to appropriate medical care. Svanberg was their only child and, whilst neither had attended school beyond sixth grade, they worked to ensure she could attend university. Her mother ran a yarn shop. Svanberg was educated at the University of Gothenburg, where she studied Swedish literature and Oceanography. After graduating with a master's degree, she joined the teacher training college at the University of Gothenburg, and spent the following ten years as a high school teacher. In 1979, she returned to Lund University to study medicine, and was a registered physician by 1988. Whilst at medical school, she would consult her husband, a physicist, on the interactions between laser light and biological tissue. Svanberg completed her specialist training in oncology.

== Research and career ==
Svanberg has investigated phototherapy for the in vivo diagnosis and treatment of cancer. She was particularly interested in the use of photodynamic therapy, and performed the first clinical session in Lund University Hospital in 1987. Alongside her clinical practice, Svanberg worked toward a doctoral degree in biophotonics, looking at the diagnosis of tumours with fluorescence spectroscopy.

Working alongside her husband, Svanberg established the Lund University Medical Laser Centre. The equipment she developed for her doctoral research was pioneered in laser-based therapies at Lund University, as well as across Europe and Africa. In the early 2000s, she led the first randomized phase III clinical trial in photodynamic therapy. She has since demonstrated that fluorescence-based spectroscopy can be used to evaluate the ripeness of avocados.

== Awards and honours ==
- 1995 The Royal Scientific Society Interdisciplinary Research Prize
- 2004 SKAPA Innovation Prize in memory of Alfred Nobel
- 2005 Elected Fellow of SPIE
- 2006 SPIE Women in Optics Planner
- 2007 Innovator Award, Society for Industrial Development
- 2014 Elected Fellow of the Electromagnetics Academy
- 2015 National Institutes of Health Bench-to-Bedside Pioneer Award
- 2017 SPIE Gold Medal

== Academic service ==
Svanberg has been involved with the promotion of optics and photonics. She was appointed to the European Laser Association in 1998. Svanberg joined the board of directors of SPIE, the international society for optics and photonics, in 2005. She was elected Vice President of SPIE in 2009, and eventually serving as president in 2011. She was a member of the steering committee for the International Year of Light efforts in 2015.

== Selected publications ==
- Wang I; Bendsoe N; Klinteberg CA; Enejder AM; Andersson-Engels S; Svanberg S; Svanberg K (1 April 2001). "Photodynamic therapy vs. cryosurgery of basal cell carcinomas: results of a phase III clinical trial". British Journal of Dermatology. 144 (4): 832–840. doi:10.1046/j.1365-2133.2001.04141.x. ISSN 0007-0963. PMID 11298545. Wikidata Q42502667.
- Andersson-Engels S; Klinteberg C; Svanberg K; Svanberg S (1 May 1997). "In vivo fluorescence imaging for tissue diagnostics". Physics in Medicine and Biology. 42 (5): 815–824. doi:10.1088/0031-9155/42/5/006. ISSN 0031-9155. PMID 9172261. Wikidata Q36863696.
- Andersson-Engels S; J. Johansson; K. Svanberg; Svanberg S (1 June 1991). "Fluorescence imaging and point measurements of tissue: applications to the demarcation of malignant tumors and atherosclerotic lesions from normal tissue". Photochemistry and Photobiology. 53 (6): 807–814. doi:10.1111/j.1751-1097.1991.tb09895.x. ISSN 0031-8655. PMID 1886939. Wikidata Q33376258.

== Personal life ==
Svanberg is married to Sune Svanberg, physicist and member of the Nobel Committee for Physics.
