= John Caulfield =

John Caulfield may refer to:

- H. John Caulfield (1936–2012), American physicist
- John Caulfield (Australian footballer) (1944–2006), Australian rules footballer
- John Caulfield (diplomat), American diplomat
- John Caulfield (colonist of Victoria) (1808–1879), included in The Explorers and Early Colonists of Victoria
- John Caulfield (Irish footballer) (born 1964), former Irish footballer and current manager
- Jack Caulfield (1929–2012), American security operative and law enforcement officer in the Nixon administration

== See also ==
- John Caulfeild (1661–1707), Irish soldier and politician
- John Caulfeild (priest) (1738–1816), Anglican priest in Ireland
