= Gregory Forbes =

Gregory Forbes may refer to:

- Gregory S. Forbes (born 1950), weather presenter
- Gregory W. Forbes, recipient of the 2012 David Richardson Medal
