= James P. C. Southall =

American physicist

- Born: April 4, 1871; Norfolk, Virginia, US
- Died: August 24, 1962 (aged 91)
- Scientific career
- Fields: Physics

James P. C. Southall (1871-1962) was an American physicist, professor at Columbia University (1914 to 1940), and specialist in optics. He was president of the Optical Society of America (1921) and translator of Physiological Optics by Helmholtz.

James Southall was born in Norfolk, Va., on April 4, 1871. He attended Richmond College from 1886 to 1888 and obtained an A.B. in 1891 and an M.A. in 1893 at the University of Virginia. He was an instructor in physics at the University of Virginia between 1891 and 1893, and he taught physics and mathematics at the Miller Manual Training School, in Albemarle, Va. He had a fellowship at Johns Hopkins from 1898 to 1899 and taught at Hobart College, Geneva, N.Y., from 1899 to 1901. From 1901 to 1914, he taught at Alabama Polytechnic Institute, and in 1914 he joined the faculty at Columbia University, where he served until his retirement in 1940. His two specialties were geometrical optics and physiological optics. He wrote Principles of Geometrical Optics in 1910 and Mirrors, Prisms and Lenses (1918, rev. eds. 1923, 1934). But he is probably best known as editor of the American edition of Helmholtz's Physiological Optics (1924–25). He also wrote Introduction to Physiological Optics (1941). He wrote many papers, a number of which appeared in JOSA, on optical illusions and geometrical optics. He served as president of the Optical Society of America in 1921.

During the First World War, he was a consultant to the War Department on range finders, periscopes, gunsights and similar optical equipment. Fifteen of his articles were published in JOSA on such topics as ray tracing, conjugate surfaces and the early pioneers in physiological optics. In retirement, he returned to Charlottesville and the University of Virginia, and donated most of his books and papers to the library there. He was buried at the University of Virginia cemetery.

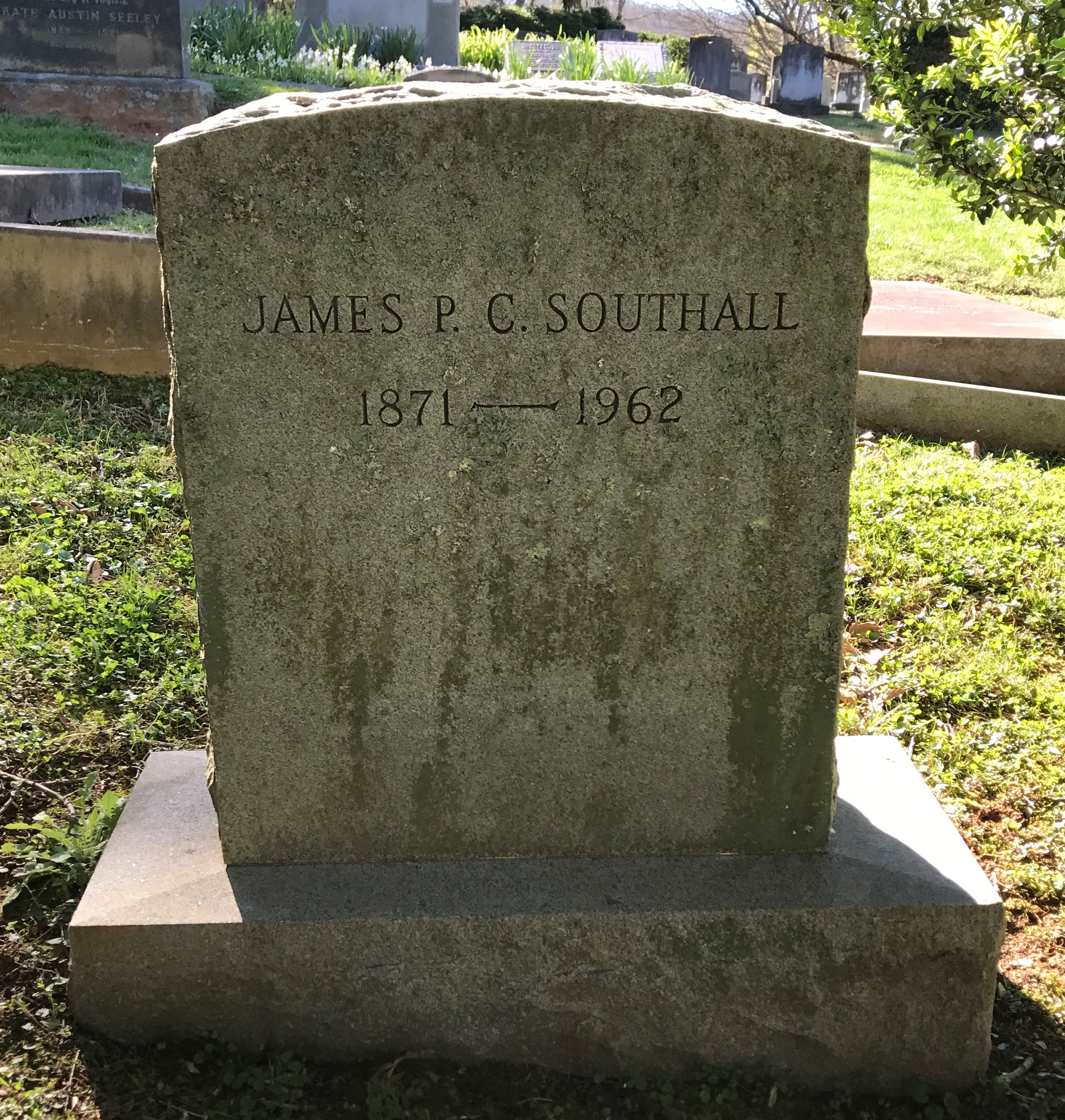
Southall's gravestone at the University of Virginia Cemetery in Charlottesville, Virginia.

== See also ==
- Optical Society of America#Past Presidents of the OSA
