= Roswell Clifton Gibbs =

American physicist and academic (1878–1966)

- Born: July 1, 1878; Hume, New York
- Died: October 4, 1966 (aged 88)
- Citizenship: United States
- Scientific career
- Fields: Physics

Roswell Clifton Gibbs (July 1, 1878 – October 4, 1966) was Chairman of the Department of Physics at Cornell University from 1934 to 1946. A graduate of Cornell, he became an assistant professor of Physics there in 1912, and a professor in 1918. His research primarily concerned spectroscopy, and he was the author or co-author of over forty research papers. As Chairman of the Department of Physics, he hired distinguished physicists including Stanley Livingston, Robert Bacher and Hans Bethe, who later won the Nobel Prize in Physics for his work at Cornell. After World War II, Gibbs was Chairman of the Mathematical and Physical Sciences Division of the National Research Council.

== Early life ==
Roswell Clifton Gibbs was born in Hume, New York, on July 1, 1878, the son of Orlando Charles Gibbs and his wife Frances née Beaderslee. He was educated at schools in Hume and Pike, New York. He married Clara Laura Davis on 22 August 1901. In 1903, he entered Cornell University, from which he received his degrees of Bachelor of Arts (AB) in 1906, Master of Arts (AM) in 1908, and Doctor of Philosophy (PhD) in 1910.

== Physicist ==
As a physicist, Gibbs's primary area of interest was spectroscopy. At the time, this was the fairly new and exciting field of research in physics. Physicists investigated the emission and absorption of radiation, creating an understanding of atomic structure. The new theory of quantum mechanics attempted to explain phenomena at the atomic and subatomic level. Gibbs was the author or co-author of over forty research papers, on subjects such as the ultraviolet spectra of isoelectronic sequences, and the hyperfine structure of spectra. He determined the charge-to-mass ratio of the electron by studying the intervals between the H-alpha lines of hydrogen and deuterium, and investigated the absorption spectra of organic compounds in solution.

Gibbs became an assistant professor of physics at Cornell in 1912, and a professor of physics in 1918. He rose to chairman of the Department of Physics from 1934 to 1946. As chairman, he moved the thrust of physics research at Cornell to nuclear physics. He hired Stanley Livingston, who had worked with Ernest Lawrence at the University of California, Berkeley, to build a cyclotron at Cornell, and Hans Bethe as a theoretical physicist, and Robert Bacher as an experimental physicist. In this, he was opposed by the Dean of the Graduate School, fellow Cornell-educated physicist Floyd K. Richtmyer, who wanted the department to concentrate on his own field of research, X-ray spectroscopy. Bethe would work at Cornell for seven decades, winning the Nobel Prize in Physics in 1967 for his work on stellar nucleosynthesis.

== Later life ==
During World War II, Gibbs struggled to meet the department's commitments in the face of the departure of key members of staff to do war work, including Bethe and Bacher, who played key roles in the Manhattan Project. He retired from Cornell in 1946, and moved to Washington, D.C., where he became the chairman of the Mathematical and Physical Sciences Division of the National Research Council. He subsequently became chairman of the advisory committee to the U. S. Army's Office of Ordnance Research. He was a consultant to the National Research Council's Nuclear Data Project, and the supervisor of its exchange-visitor program. He was also the editor of the Directory of Nuclear Data Tabulations for many years.

Gibbs a member of the Optical Society of America, serving as its president from 1937 to 1938, a Fellow of the American Physical Society and member of the American Association of Physics Teachers, serving as its president in 1942 and again from 1944 to 1946, and the American Association for the Advancement of Science, of which he was vice-president in 1945). He was also a member of Phi Kappa Phi, and was its president for a time.

He died on October 14, 1966.

== See also ==
- Optical Society of America § Past Presidents of the OSA
