= Richtmyer =

Richtmyer is a surname. Notable people with the surname include:

- Floyd K. Richtmyer (1881–1939), American physicist
- Robert D. Richtmyer (1910–2003), American mathematician
