= David Richardson Medal =

Medal awarded by the Optical Society

The David Richardson Medal is awarded by the Optical Society (formerly the Optical Society of America) to recognize contributions to optical engineering, primarily in the commercial and industrial sector. The award was first made in 1966 to its namesake, David J. Richardson. He received it for his distinctive contributions to the ruling and replication of gratings used to determine the transfer functions of lenses. There is a prize associated with the medal.

Richardson received a graduate degree in spectroscopy from the Massachusetts Institute of Technology in the mid-1930s. He was hired by Bausch and Lomb in 1947 to establish a grating and scale-ruling laboratory that became the world's leader in diffraction gratings. The lab, which was renamed for him in 1966, has since 2004 belonged to the Newport Corporation.

== Recipients ==
Year	Recipient
2026	William Cassarly
2025	Marija Strojnik Scholl
2024	Radhakrishnan Nagarajan
2023	Turan Erdogan
2022	Jim Tatum
2021	Majid Ebrahim-Zadeh
2020	G. Michael Morris
2019	Frederick J. Leonberger
2018	Steve Frisken
2017	John Canning
2016	Francisco J. Duarte
2015	Daniel R. Neal
2014	Jannick P. Rolland
2012	Gregory W. Forbes
2011	Jasbinder S. Sanghera
2011	Ishwar D. Aggarwal
2010	Kenneth E. Moore
2009	Eric Udd
2008	Kanti Jain
2007	James L. Fergason
2006	Gary S Duck
2005	John R. Sandercock
2004	Chungte W. Chen
2003	Roland V. Shack
2002	Arthur H. Guenther
2001	Huib Visser
2000	Achim J. Leistner
1999	Milan R. Kokta
1998	Yoshiharu Namba
1997	Brian H. Welham
1996	J. A. Dobrowolski
1995	Julian Stone
1994	David A. Markle
1993	John H. Bruning
1992	Ichiro Kitano
1991	Gary K. Starkweather
1990	Jean M. Bennett
1989	Erik W. Anthon
1988	Janusz S. Wilczynski
1987	John W. Evans
1986	John L. Plummer
1985	Norman John Brown
1984	Erwin G. Loewen
1983	Harold Osterberg
1982	Charles A. Burrus
1981	Abe Offner
1980	William T. Plummer
1980	Richard F. Weeks
1979	William P. Ewald
1978	Thomas James Johnson
1977	Walter P. Siegmund
1976	John McLeod
1975	Karl Lambrecht
1974	Roderic M. Scott
1972	William G. Fastie
1971	Frank Cooke
1970	Richard S. Hunter
1969	Howard Cary
1968	Harold E. Edgerton
1967	George A. Morton
1966	David J. Richardson

== See also ==
- List of physics awards
