= Stefan Andersson-Engels =

Biophysics professor and entrepreneur

- Born: 1960 (age 65–66)
- Education: Lund University
- Awards: Skapa Innovation prize (2004).
- Scientific career
- Fields: biophotonics
- Workplaces: University College Cork, Tyndall National Institute
- Doctoral advisor: Sune Svanberg
- Website: https://www.tyndall.ie/people/stefan-andersson-engels/, https://www.ipic.ie/people/stefan-andersson-engels-people/

Stefan Andersson-Engels (born 1960) is a Swedish biophysicist specializing in the field of biophotonics. He is professor at University College Cork and the deputy director of the Irish Photonics Integration Center (IPIC) within the Science Foundation Ireland. Before joining University College Cork, he was Professor of Biomedical Engineering at Lund University. He has co-founded 3 biophotonics companies Spectracure, Lumito, BioPixS. He also co-founded biannual biophotonics summer school.

Andersson-Engels is actively engaged in translational research, by working closely with clinicians and patients to explore and validate possible clinical application of biophotonics tools. He is considered a pioneer in biophotonics for his continuous development of advanced technologies like Photodynamic therapy, time domain diffuse optical spectroscopy, Upconverting nanoparticles for multi-modal and diffuse optical imaging. He won Erna Eblings Prize for the use of laser spectroscopy for the diagnosis of pathological tissue conditions and his development of methods for the treatment of skin tumors with photodynamic therapy

== Awards and honors ==
- 2018, Elected Fellow Member of The International Society for Optics and Photonics (SPIE)
- 2016, Elected Fellow Member of The Optical Society of America (OSA)
- 2014, Swedish Royal Academy of Science - Lindblomska Belöningen award
- 2014, Royal Physiographic Society of Lund - Elected Fellow
- 2004, Skapa Innovation prize in memory of Alfred Nobel – the most prestigious innovation prize in Sweden
- 2003, Swedish Medical Association - Erna Eblings Prize
- 2000, U.S. Co-Chair, Gordon Research Conference on Lasers in Medicine and Biology
