= Journal of Near Infrared Spectroscopy =

- Discipline: Spectroscopy
- Language: English
- Edited by: Roger Meder

Publication details
- History: 1993–present
- Publisher: SAGE Publishing on behalf of Optica
- Frequency: Bimonthly
- Impact factor: 1.9 (2024)

Standard abbreviations
- ISO 4: J. Near Infrared Spectrosc.

Indexing
- CODEN: JNISEI
- ISSN: 0967-0335 (print); 1751-6552 (web)

Links
- Journal homepage; Journal homepage (Optica)

The Journal of Near Infrared Spectroscopy is a bimonthly peer-reviewed scientific journal published by SAGE Publishing in partnership with Optica. It was established in 1993 and covers near-infrared spectroscopy and its applications, with subtopics including chemometrics, chemical imaging, fiber optics, instrumentation and diffuse reflection. Its editor-in-chief is Roger Meder.

== Abstracting and indexing ==
The journal is abstracted and indexed in :

- Chemical Abstracts
- Current Contents/Engineering, Computing & Technology
- Inspec
- Science Citation Index Expanded
- Scopus

According to the Journal Citation Reports, the journal has a 2024 impact factor of 1.9.
