= Stanley S. Ballard =

American physicist

- Born: 1908
- Died: 1998 (aged 89–90)
- Education: Pomona College; University of California, Berkeley
- Awards: Oersted Medal (1986)
- Scientific career
- Fields: Optics

Stanley S. Ballard (1908–1998) was an American physicist, specializing in optics. He was president of the Optical Society of America in 1963 and of the American Association of Physics Teachers during 1968–69. In 1986 he was awarded the Oersted Medal. During World War II, Ballard served as a Commander in the United States Navy. From 1956 to 1959 he was the president of the International Commission for Optics.

Ballard obtained his PhD and M.Sc. in physics from the University of California, Berkeley, and his undergraduate degree from Pomona College. He served on the faculties of several physics departments, including as chairman at Tufts University and the University of Florida.

In 1954 he coauthored Physics Principles (with Edgar P. Slack and Erich Hausmann)

In 1964 The Commission on College Physics published Polarized Light which he wrote with William Shurcliff. A reviewer noted the "straightforward, conversational style" and that "The treatment is mostly non-mathematical but touches on electromagnetic theory, the Poincaré sphere, Stokes vectors, and Mueller matrices with great clarity."

== See also ==
- Optical Society of America#Past Presidents of the OSA
