= William Homan Thorpe =

British zoologist, ethologist and ornithologist

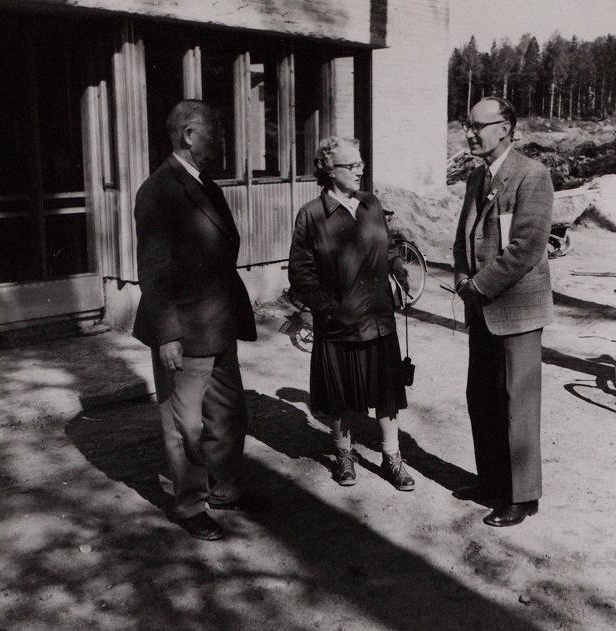
Mr and Mrs J.P. Niven of the South African Ornithological Society with Dr W.H. Thorpe (right) during the XII Ornithological Congress in Finland, Otaniemi, June 7, 1958

William Homan Thorpe FRS (1 April 1902 – 7 April 1986) was a British zoologist, ethologist and ornithologist who was Professor of Animal Ethology at the University of Cambridge. Together with Nikolaas Tinbergen, Patrick Bateson and Robert Hinde, Thorpe contributed to the growth and acceptance of behavioural biology in Great Britain.

== Biography ==
=== Early life and career ===
Thorpe was born in Hastings and grew up in Weston-super-Mare. His father Francis Homan was a borough accountant who also worked with the London Missionary Society while his mother took part in the women's suffrage movement and was involved in Christian pacifism. He was taken care of by a nurse Ellen Clara Birt while his parents travelled in the United States.

He studied for a while at Clarence School, Weston-super-Mare and was sent at fourteen to Mill Hill School, after which he entered Jesus College, Cambridge, in 1921 to obtain a degree in Agriculture. He had been influenced by a talk by Maxwell Lefroy that there was a growing need for entomologists. In 1925 he began to work in the Department of Agriculture on insect pests. He continued on this line during two years at the University of California as a Rockefeller Fellow. Awarded the PhD from Cambridge in 1929, he then moved to the Imperial Institute of Entomology, returning to Cambridge three years later as a lecturer in Entomology and Fellow of Jesus College. A religious conscientious objector, during World War II he studied insects that preyed on stored food.

In 1943 he published an extensive review on insect learning, following it with a similar work on birds in 1951. He closely followed the burgeoning ethological research of Konrad Lorenz and Niko Tinbergen, introducing their work to English readers. In 1951–52 he was the Prather Lecturer at Harvard University, and in 1956 published his book Learning and Instinct in Animals. In 1950 he became the first director of the Cambridge Ornithological Field Station; he was appointed Reader in Zoology in 1959 and awarded a personal chair in 1966.

=== Bird song ===
When the sound spectrograph was launched he saw that recording sound frequencies and intensities over time made it possible to quantitatively analyze bird song. He obtained the first of these devices in the UK, fathering a group of talented investigators of song. He also led a rigorously controlled study of imprinting learning.

=== Other ===
He was a member of the advisory committee to the Anti-Concorde Project and as a vocal conservationist led in saving Wicken Fen from draining and development.

Thorpe was a critic of mechanistic materialism. He authored the book Purpose in a World of Chance (1978); in opposition to Jacques Monod, he argued for purpose and mind in nature. Thorpe was a theist and argued for the compatibility of religious belief with the practice of science. He identified as a philosophical dualist.

=== Death ===
He died in Woodwalton Fen.

== Honours ==
He was elected to the Royal Society in 1951 and speaker at the Gifford lectures from 1969 to 1971. He was president of the British Ornithologists' Union from 1955 to 1960.

== Bibliography ==
- Learning and Instinct in Animals (1956) Methuen, London ISBN 0-416-57920-5
- Biology, Psychology and Belief (Arthur Stanley Eddington memorial lectures) (1960)
- Bird-Song. The biology of vocal communication and expression in birds, University Press, Cambridge 1961, (Cambridge monographs in experimental biology; Vol. 12)
- Biology and Nature of Man (Riddell Memorial Lecture) (1962)
- Duetting and antiphonal song in birds. Its extent and significance, Brill, Leiden 1972, ISBN 90-04-03432-3 (Behaviour / Supplements; Vol. 18)
- Quakers and Humanists (Swarthmore Lectures) (1968)
- Animal Nature and Human Nature (1975)
- Science, Man and Morals. Based upon the Freemantle lectures, delivered in Balliol College, Oxford, Trinity term 1963, Greenwood, Westport, Conn. 1976, ISBN 0-8371-8143-7
- Purpose in a World of Chance: A Biologist's View (1978)
- The Origins and Rise of Ethology. The Science of the Natural Behaviour of Animals, Heinemann, London 1979, ISBN 0-435-62441-5
