= Hugo Thienpont =

Hugo Thienpont (born 20 August 1961) is a Belgian engineer.

Thienpont was born on 20 August 1961 in Gooik. He became interested in engineering after watching science fiction media Star Trek, Voyage to the Bottom of the Sea and UFO, and decided to pursue the subject in depth at the Vrije Universiteit Brussel, despite the initial misgivings of his father Marcel. Thienpont earned his bachelor's degree in 1984, completed his doctorate in 1990, then joined the faculty in 1994. He was vice-rector of VUB from 2018 to 2024. Thienpont is the founding editor in chief of Journal of Physics: Photonics.

Thienpont received the SPIE President's Award in 2005, and was elected a fellow of SPIE in 2006. Between 2009 and 2011, Thienpont served as on SPIE's board of directors. In 2021, Thienpont was awarded the SPIE Gold Medal.
