= Frank Cooke (engineer) =

American businessman

- Born: May 24, 1913; Bismarck, North Dakota
- Died: December 10, 2005 (aged 92); North Brookfield, Massachusetts
- Occupation: Entrepreneur
- Spouse: Marjorie (Stevens)
- Awards: SPIE Gold Medal (1984)

Frank Cooke (1913–2005) was an American entrepreneur who lived within, and started a high-tech optical business in North Brookfield, Massachusetts.

== Education and experience ==
Cooke graduated from Wabash College with a degree in English. He had no formal education in the optical business that he founded. He discouraged the use of mathematics and, instead, developed precision optical measurement methods. During World War II, Cooke worked for Polaroid's Edwin Land, obtaining much on-the-job experience. Eventually he ran Polaroid's wartime optical department.

== Frank Cooke Optics ==
His company, Frank Cooke Optics, specialized in the optical work that many other companies turned down because of its complexity or precision. To handle the tedious and difficult work, Cooke hired mostly women because he thought that they were more skillful than men were. Work was scheduled so that the women could work during the time that their children were in school. Once Cooke started his company, he became known worldwide as an expert in the field of optical engineering and optics technology. His company specialized in space optics, which included work on NASA's Galileo probe, and the Hubble Space Telescope. Cooke authored the Optics Cooke Book, ISBN 155752212X, published by the Optical Society of America. It is considered by many to be the Optics Industry "bible." Cooke was awarded the David Richardson Medal in 1971.

== Automobile collection ==
To those not in the optical field, Cooke was best known for his antique automobile collection, which included vehicles such as the “Stanley Steamer,” which he would occasionally ride around North Brookfield. Cooke spent much of his free time at his “Vintage Garage,” restoring antique automobiles. He called this, “worshiping old iron.” Upon his death, Cooke's collection of unique automobiles was sold and the Vintage Garage was moved to Stowe, Vermont.

== Personal life ==
He was born in 1913 and died at the age of 92 in 2005.
