= Warren J. Smith =

- Born: 17 August 1922; Rochester, New York
- Died: 19 June 2008 (aged 85); California
- Citizenship: USA (American)
- Education: Institute of Optics at the University of Rochester
- Known for: author of two editions of Modern Optical Engineering - The Design of Optical Systems, Modern Lens Design - A Resource Manual and Practical Optical Systems Layout.
- Awards: SPIE Gold Medal of the Society and Directors' Award. Fellow of both OSA and SPIE, and also OSSC.
- Scientific career
- Fields: Physics
- Workplaces: Chief Scientist at Kaiser Electro Optics in Carlsbad, California

Warren J. Smith (1922-2008) was president of the Optical Society of America in 1980.

Warren Smith is world-renowned in the optics community as author of two editions of Modern Optical Engineering - The Design of Optical Systems, Modern Lens Design - A Resource Manual and Practical Optical Systems Layout. He was a Founder and President of the Chicago Section of the Optical Society of America (OSA); a Director of the Optical Society of Southern California (OSSC); National President of OSA in 1980; recipient of the SPIE Gold Medal; and National President of the SPIE in 1983. He is a Fellow of the OSA, SPIE and the OSSC. He taught optics courses for the University of Wisconsin, SPIE, OSA, and various companies and government agencies at worldwide locations.

"Warren was a mentor who always listened, and was always very supportive," said Max Riedl, who worked with Smith at Infrared Industries in Santa Barbara, CA. "A clear and critical thinker, he was never satisfied with 'just' solving an optical problem. During the 23 years we worked together, I never saw any of his designs that did not bring the predicted results."

Born on 17 August 1922, Smith graduated from Institute of Optics at the University of Rochester. After graduation, he worked for Eastman Kodak in Oak Ridge, Tennessee. In 1946 he became Chief Optical Engineer at Simpson Optical Manufacturing Company in Chicago, IL, and in 1959 he moved Raytheon in Santa Barbara, CA, where he was Manager of the Optics Section until 1962. From 1962 until 1983 he was Director of R&D at Infrared Industries in Santa Barbara, and Vice President of R&D at Santa Barbara Applied Optics until 1987.

After 1987, Warren Smith was the chief scientist at Kaiser Electro Optics in Carlsbad, California working part-time at the end of his career due to the demands of consulting, teaching, and expert witnessing, and writing the 3rd edition of his book Modern Optical Engineering.

Warren J. Smith resided in Vista, California, until his death on 19 June 2008. He was survived by his wife Mary Helen Smith (they married in 1944) and their two grown children David and Barbara.

== See also ==
- Optical Society of America § Past Presidents of the OSA
