= Journal of Physics: Photonics =

- Discipline: Photonics
- Language: English
- Edited by: Hugo Thienpont

Publication details
- History: 2019–present
- Publisher: IOP Publishing
- Frequency: Quarterly
- Open access: Yes
- Impact factor: 4.7 (2025)

Standard abbreviations
- ISO 4: J. Phys. Photonics

Indexing
- ISSN: 2515-7647
- OCLC no.: 1122879622

Links
- Journal homepage; Online access

Journal of Physics: Photonics, also known as JPhys: Photonics, is a quarterly peer-reviewed scientific journal published by IOP Publishing. Established in 2019, it is an open access journal and covers advances in all aspects of photonics. Its editor-in-chief is Hugo Thienpont (Vrije Universiteit Brussel).

== Abstracting and indexing ==
The journal is abstracted and indexed in:

- Directory of Open Access Journals
- Ei Compendex
- Emerging Sources Citation Index
- Inspec
- Scopus

According to the Journal Citation Reports, the journal has a 2025 impact factor of 4.7.
