= Anti-Concorde Project =

Environmental organisation

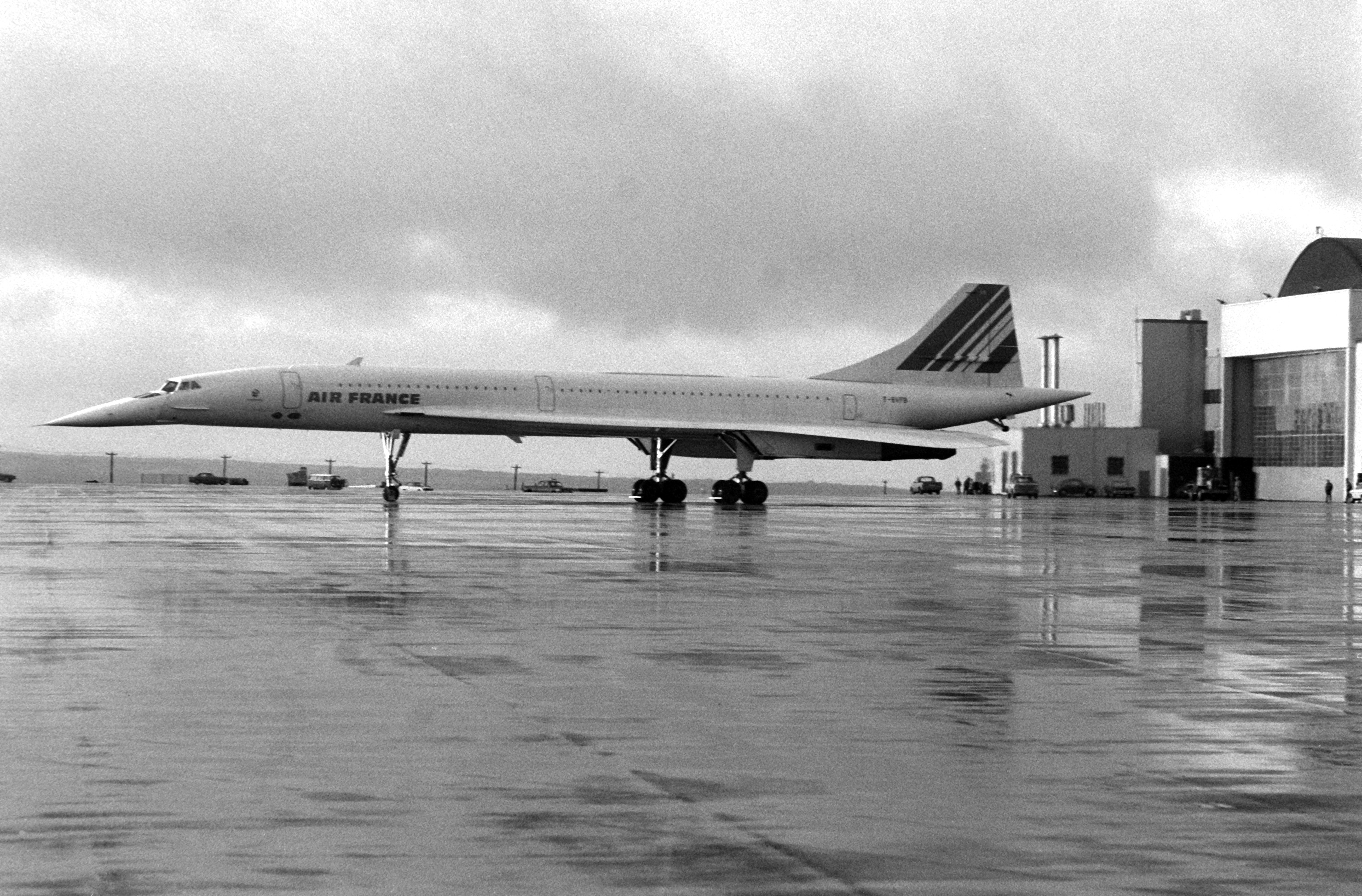
Concorde in 1977

The Anti-Concorde Project, founded by environmental activist Richard Wiggs, challenged the idea of supersonic passenger transport, and curtailed Concorde's commercial prospects. When Concorde entered service in 1976, of the 74 options (non-binding orders, from 16 airlines) held at the time of the first flight, only those for the state airlines of Britain (BOAC) and France (Air France) were taken up, so that only 20 were built, although flights were also flown for Braniff International and Singapore Airlines. It triggered research into the factors affecting the creation of sonic booms, which led to the Shaped Sonic Boom Demonstration which achieved their goal of reducing the intensity of sonic booms (by about one-third), and echoed public concern about aircraft noise that resulted in more restrictive noise limits for aircraft and airport operations, as well as changes in both operating procedures and aircraft design to further reduce noise levels.

== Overview ==
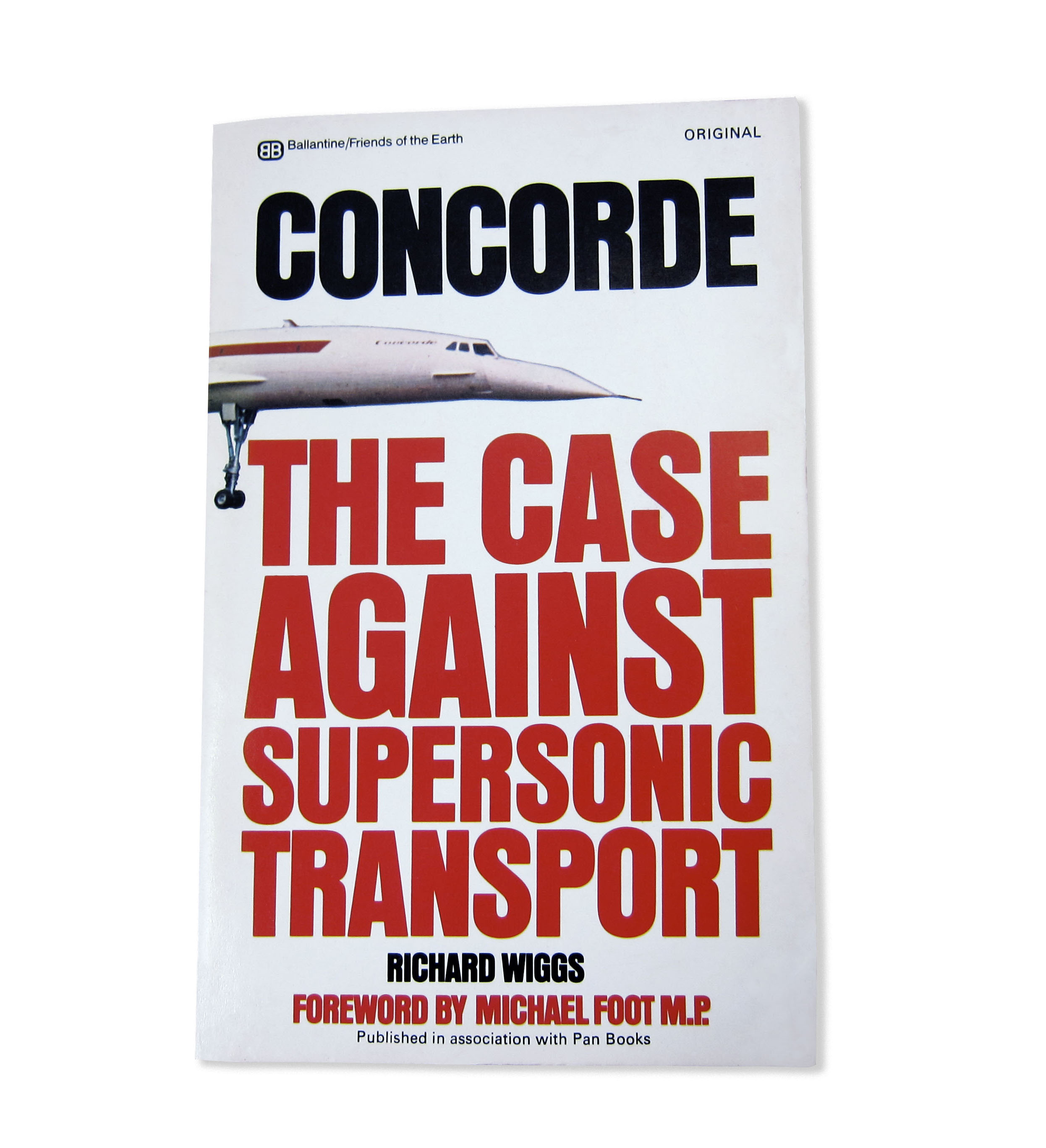
Concorde: The Case Against Supersonic Transport, written by Richard Wiggs, foreword by Michael Foot M.P

In the late 1950s, following the breaking of the sound barrier, first by experimental aircraft, then military aircraft, a supersonic passenger aircraft was thought feasible. By the early 1970s however, opposition led to bans on commercial supersonic flight in Sweden, Norway, the Netherlands, West Germany, Switzerland, Ireland, Canada and the United States. The choice of routes available was limited as supersonic flight was only possible outside built up areas, primarily over water, and few airfields were large enough for their takeoff runs. It was also clear that the aircraft was costly to build, and used more fuel per passenger per kilometer than other commercial aircraft at a time of rapidly rising fuel prices.

Research by aeronautics engineer Bo Lundberg, Director of the Swedish Aeronautical Research Institute in the early 1960s suggested that sonic booms and aircraft engine noise would not be widely accepted. (Note: Lundberg's studies included: "Is Supersonic Aviation compatible with the Sound Development of Civil Aviation?" published by the Swedish Aeronautical Research Institute, 1962; Aviation Safety and the SST in Astronautics and Aeronautics January 1965; Supersonic Aviation, a Test Case for Democracy, NATO's Fifteen Nations, April–July issues 1965; The Menace of the Sonic Boom to Society and Civil Aviation, Aeronautical Research Institute of Sweden, Report FFA-PE-19, May 1966.)

The Anti-Concorde Project was founded in 1966 by Richard Wiggs (a school teacher) to oppose the development of supersonic passenger transport. Wiggs positioned the Concorde as a test case in the confrontation between the environment and technology.

== Origins ==
An Anglo-French Agreement to build Concorde was signed in 1962. In 1963, The Observer newspaper published The Supersonic Threat, based on Lundberg's study Speed and Safety In Civil Aviation. The article claimed that the Concorde's sonic booms would produce effects varying from annoyance to physical shock, breaking windows and causing structural damage to buildings. In letters to the paper, some readers wrote that this would be an "intolerable price for ordinary citizens to pay for the transportation of privileged business travelers" A reader, Mr. D. W. Rowell, wrote that he would support an anti-Concorde movement, if only someone would organize it. Public figures who wrote to newspapers expressing concern about the development of Concorde included Alec Guinness, and Pamela Hansford Johnson, and Baroness Snow. A primary school teacher, conscientious objector and vegan from Letchworth, Hertfordshire, Richard Wiggs, wrote to The Observer inviting people to write to him. He received 80 letters the next day, and within a few months gave up teaching to become full-time organiser of the Anti-Concorde Project.

In a letter to The Times in July 1967, Wiggs wrote:

Anti-Concord Project (Note: the 'e' of the French spelling was adopted December 1967.)

From Richard Wiggs

Sir, Miss Pamela Hansford and Sir Alec Guinness (July 5 and 10), and many other readers of 'The Times' may be glad to know of the existence of the Anti-Concord Project, which has been founded by a group of some hundreds of people including scientists, artists, business men, civil servants, farmers, housewives, professors, M.P.s etc. who are concerned and alarmed at the efforts being made to develop supersonic aircraft.

We see this as a clear case of a choice having to be made – is technology to be sanely controlled or is it to be allowed increasingly to degrade and destroy our environment?

Our immediate aims are to help create in Britain a climate of public opinion in which it will be possible for the Government to terminate work upon Concord, and to press the Government to make this decision. Our further aim (in co-operation with similar movements in other countries) is to help bring about the banning of supersonic transports internationally.

We shall be glad to hear from people who agree with these aims.

Yours faithfully,
RICHARD WIGGS, Convener.

== Methodology ==
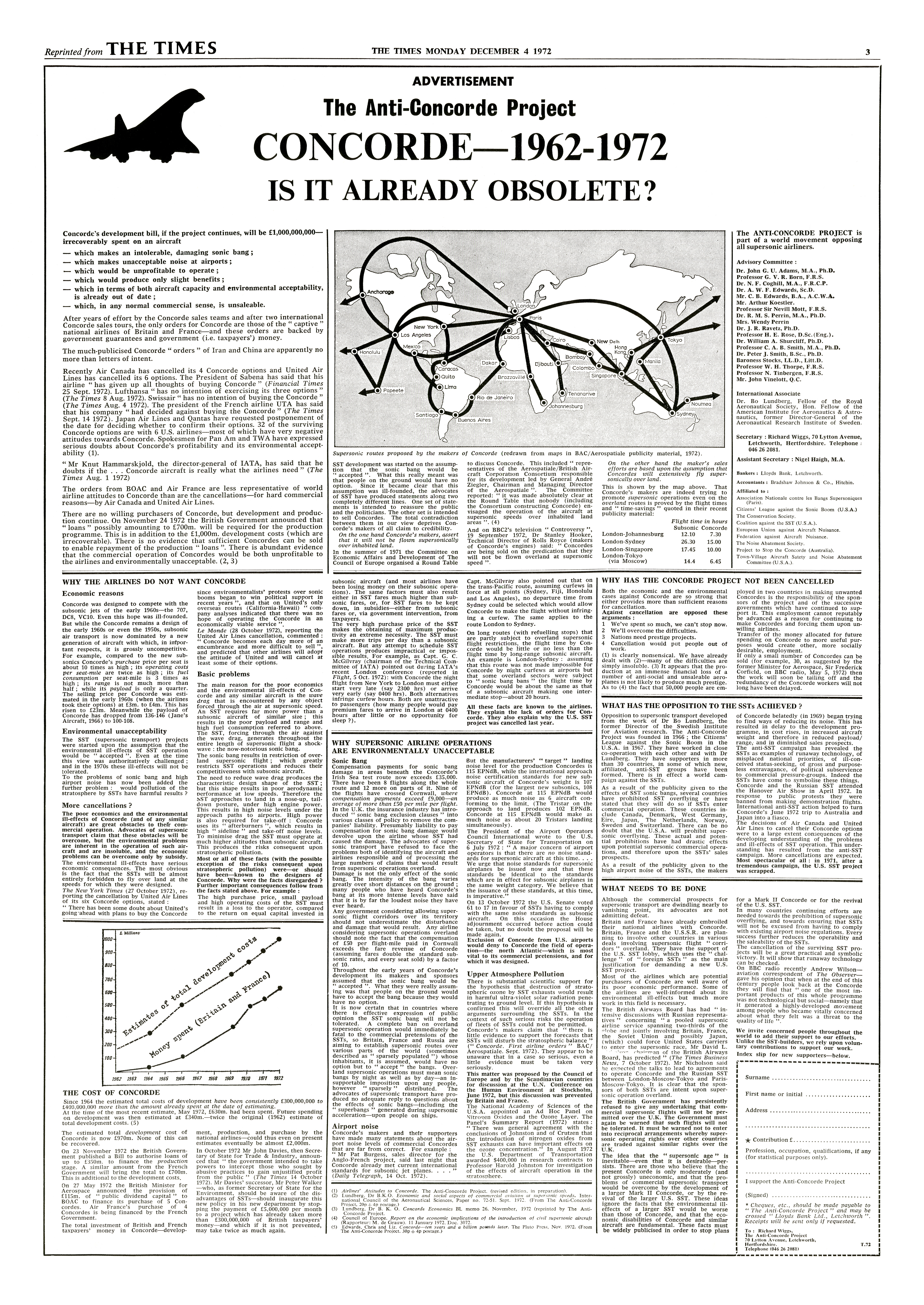
Full page advertisement by Richard Wiggs for the Anti-Concorde Project, run in "The Times" in 1972.

Before the new Labour government took office in October 1964 with a £700m annual deficit, Government-funded "prestige projects" such as the Concorde (with escalating costs) had been shortlisted for cancellation. The 1962 development estimates for Concorde were £150-170m, and had risen to £280m. Evidence of financial mismanagement also emerged and the UK Treasury, responsible for tracking government spending, had not been involved in drawing up the Anglo-French agreement to build Concorde, and was not represented on the Concorde Finance Committee. (Note: House of Commons Estimates Committee, January 1964. Development costs continued to spiral out of control: by 1966, they were estimated at £500m; in 1969 it was £730m; in 1970, £825m. Ultimately, development costs exceeded £1 billion.) The British government announced the cancellation of the Concord on 19 November but rescinded it the next day due to agreements with France and to the massive layoffs that would have resulted, but did cancel other projects. Wiggs believed that a strong enough lobby might have forced the cancellation. Wiggs began publishing claims about ozone depletion, sonic booms, airport noise, fuel consumption, potential profitability, and claimed that the taxpayer funded research and development costs would not be recovered for what he regarded as an "elitist and inherently unsafe" transport.

Wiggs corresponded with newspaper editors and other correspondents, disputing claims by the British Aircraft Corporation (the British partner in building the Concorde) and by Government Ministers responsible for the program. Letter-writing only went so far, and so Wiggs began advertising in the national press, initially in New Scientist, New Society and the New Statesman, and later, full page advertisements in The Guardian, The Times, and The Observer. The advertisements argued against supersonic transport, and requested donations for further advertisements. Later advertisements included the names of contributors.

== Advisory Committee ==
Following his initial letters to the newspapers, Wiggs enlisted an Anti-Concorde Project Advisory Committee:

- Dr. John Adams, Professor of Geography, University College, London. Also original member of the Board of Directors of Friends of the Earth.
- Professor Gustav Victor Rudolf Born, FRCP, FRS, Dept. of Pharmacology, King's College, London
- Dr. Nelson F. Coghill, FRCP, West Middlesex University Hospital
- Mr. C. B. Edwards, lecturer in economics, University of East Anglia, and author of Concorde – A Study In Cost Benefit Analysis, University of East Anglia, 1969
- Dr. A. W. F. Edwards, professor of biometry, University of Cambridge
- Professor Sir Nevill Mott, FRS, head of the Cavendish Laboratory, University of Cambridge. (Note: Professor Mott's autobiography describes how he became involved with the Anti-Concorde Project.)
- Dr. R. M. S. Perrin, University of Cambridge
- Dr. Jerome Ravetz, professor in the history and philosophy of science, University of Leeds. Also first Executive Secretary for Council for Science and Society, 1973–76
- Professor Horace E. Rose, Department of Mechanical Engineering, King's College, London
- Dr. William Shurcliff, physicist and senior research associate at the Cambridge Electron Accelerator, Harvard University; director of Citizens' League Against the Sonic Boom, author of SST and the Sonic Boom Handbook, Ballantine Books, 1970
- Professor Cedric A. B. Smith, professor of biometry at the Galton Laboratory, University College, London
- Dr. Peter J. Smith, senior lecturer, Department of Earth Sciences, Open University
- Mary Stocks, Baroness Stocks, writer
- Professor William Homan Thorpe, FRS, professor of ethology, University of Cambridge
- Professor Nikolaas Tinbergen, FRS, professor of ethology, University of Oxford, and winner of 1973 Nobel Prize in Physiology/ Medicine
- Professor Bo Lundberg, director of the Aeronautical Research Institute, Sweden, International Associate
- Mr. Nigel Haigh, M.A. (Note: Nigel Haigh became the London director of the Institute for European Environmental Policy. As assistant secretary he represented the Anti-Concorde Project on trips to South Africa and Australia.)

== Case against supersonic transport ==
=== Sonic boom ===
A sonic boom is a shock-wave, or pressure disturbance, caused by the movement of the plane through the air, much like the wave produced by the bow of a ship as it moves through water: just as the bow wave is produced for the entire journey of the ship, so the sonic shockwave occurs throughout the duration of a supersonic flight.

In subsonic flight, the plane pushes the air ahead of it out of the way as it moves. When a plane is traveling faster than the speed of sound (i.e. faster than air molecules normally travel) the air ahead of it is not pushed out of the way: the air remains still until the plane has approached to within half an inch, at which point the air is forced aside in a few millionths of a second. This creates extreme local compression and heating, and a shockwave spreads outwards in a cone. This pressure wave extends as much as 25 miles on either side of the flight path, and may be experienced as a loud sound, with accompanying vibration severe enough in close proximity to break windows and damage buildings.

Development had begun before the effects of sonic boom tests had been conducted. During 1961 and 1962, 150 supersonic flights were made over St Louis, Missouri, in 1964, flights were made over Oklahoma City for five months, and in 1965, there was further testing over Chicago, Milwaukee, and Pittsburgh and finally, in 1966 and 1967 at Edwards Air Force Base in California. Animals were found to react more to the observers than to the sonic booms.

Residents submitted claims for hundreds of thousands of dollars in damages from sonic booms for broken windows, cracked plaster, tile and brick. In addition, routine exercises flown by supersonic US Air Force jets resulted in $3,800,000 in sonic boom damage claims in a three-month period in 1967.

In July 1967, the UK Ministry of Technology staged eleven supersonic test flights over the south of England using Lightning fighters. The booms were to be measured by the RAF to relate them to the resulting public reaction. The Guardian's opinion survey stated: "Nearly two thirds of the population of Bristol were frightened, startled or annoyed by the sonic booms to which they were subjected to last week." The Ministry received 12,000 complaints.

=== Airport noise claims ===
Both Wiggs and the Anti-Concord Project claimed that the Concorde was louder than conventional aircraft on take-off and landing as a result of its delta wing being optimized for high speeds so it needed to use more power than conventional aircraft. When measured in 1977, the British Civil Aviation Authority (CAA) noted:

On departure, the Concorde was generally a few PNdb noiser than the older long-range jets at the fixed monitoring points and noticeably noisier both closer to and further from the airport. At the arrival sites, Concorde was a few PNdb noisier than the older long range jets, except at 1.5 km from runway threshold, where it was on a par with the B 707.

In the US, the Concorde noise was measured at DFW and Dulles airports:

Based on the data given in Tables 11 and 12, it appears that the approach noise of the Concorde is somewhat higher than that for present day commercial aircraft. The takeoff noise is, for locations close the airport, considerably higher than present aircraft.

Considerably higher, here, means more than an order of magnitude (10 db) louder.

== International opposition ==
In late 1969, the British Aircraft Corporation referred to "the assumption that supersonic flight will be allowed only over the oceans or over areas with sparse populations" as "extremely pessimistic" saying that they "do not expect that its sonic boom will be unacceptable to the great majority of the public."

After the appearance of the first Anti-Concorde Project advertisement in New Scientist, Professor John J. Edsell, of Harvard University, began corresponding with Wiggs. A few months later, Edsell, together with Dr. William A. Shurcliff, a physicist and senior research associate at the Cambridge Electron Accelerator, founded the Citizens' League Against the Sonic Boom in March 1967. Andrew Wilson wrote: The League "adopted the same propaganda techniques as the Project with astounding success." In December 1970, the US Senate voted to prohibit commercial supersonic flights over the US and to restrict noise levels at US airports.

Sweden, Norway, the Netherlands, West Germany and Switzerland indicated that they would be unlikely to permit supersonic over-flights. (Note: International Conference on the Sonic Boom, Paris February 1970, which took place under the auspices of the Organisation for Economic Co-operation and Development) Ireland drafted legislation, and Canada prohibited supersonic over-flight. Opposition and route restrictions aside, the BOAC and Air France maintained plans to fly supersonic over "sparsely populated" regions such as the deserts of Africa, Saudi Arabia and Australia.

Restricting supersonic flight to over water meant that when Concorde entered service in January 1976, the only routes it flew were London – Bahrain, Paris – Rio and Paris – Caracas. Despite the ban, in May 1976 flights were allowed into Washington Dulles International Airport. When the Federal ban was lifted at John F. Kennedy International Airport (JFK), Carol Berman and the Emergency Coalition to Stop the SST, with help from Wiggs, organized opposition which led to New York City imposing its own ban. Nine months later, a Supreme Court ruling allowed flights into JFK.

In December 1977 the aircraft flew the London – Singapore round trip route three times in Singapore Airlines livery before the Malaysian government rescinded permission from overflying their airspace, likely as a result of their own airline being denied increased access to London. Concorde was also denied permission to overfly India as the United Kingdom government was unwilling to grant additional flight slots or Fifth freedom rights.

== Media ==
The Modern Records Centre, University of Warwick holds a collection of archives of the Anti-Concorde Project, comprising publicity material issued by the Project, 1967–1981, minutes and agendas of the Advisory Committee, and subject files compiled by the Secretary of the Project. The collection also includes press cuttings, reports and publications.

The 2003 BBC2 documentary, Concorde – A Love Story aired in the US in 2005 as a PBS Nova documentary, Supersonic Dream, and includes archival footage of Wiggs and interviews with family members. As narrator Richard Donat explains: "In Britain, Concorde's nemesis came in the guise of a retired schoolteacher, Richard Wiggs. Working from his family home, his aim was simple: to stop Concorde from flying."

== Sources ==
- Wiggs, Richard (1970). Concorde: The Case Against Supersonic Transport, Ballantine Books/Friends of the Earth.
- Wilson, Andrew (1973). The Concorde Fiasco, Penguin Books.
