= Robert R. Shannon =

- Education: University of Rochester (B.S., 1954) (M.S., 1957)
- Awards: SPIE Gold Medal (1996)
- Scientific career
- Fields: Optics
- Workplaces: University of Arizona College of Optical Sciences

Robert R. Shannon is professor emeritus of Optical Sciences at the University of Arizona College of Optical Sciences. He was president of the Optical Society of America in 1985.

Professor Shannon received his BS and MA from the University of Rochester in 1954 and 1957 respectively.

His research is on the use of computers for testing and optical design, the metrication of large optical systems, the design of synthetic-aperture optical systems, the analysis and design of unobscured-aperture optical systems, optical fabrication and test methods and optical data storage technology.

== See also ==
- Optical Society of America § Past Presidents of the OSA
