= Guifang Li =

Guifang Li is a FPCE Professor of Optics, Electrical & Computer Engineering and Physics at University of Central Florida, Orlando, Florida.

== Career ==
Li holds Ph.D. from the University of Wisconsin–Madison and is an associate editor of Optica and Photonics as well as deputy editor of Optics Express.

Li is a fellow of SPIE, and The Optical Society He was named Fellow of the Institute of Electrical and Electronics Engineers (IEEE) in 2013 for contributions to all-optical signal processing and high-capacity fiber-optic transmission.

In 2015, Li became an elected fellow of the National Academy of Inventors.
