= John Adams (geographer) =

British academic (1938–2024)

John Adams (13 August 1938 – 2024) of University College London, was an emeritus professor of geography and theorist on risk compensation. His book Risk is an analysis of how humans assess and respond to perceived risks. Adams died in 2024.

== Areas of interest ==
=== Risk compensation ===
Adams is known for a theory of risk compensation, that states that a 'risk thermostat' guides much human behavior. Humans experiencing a 'safe' lifestyle seek out risky activities; but when doing them, overcompensate before returning to safety. This behaviour operates like a thermostat, regulating human behavior. He argues that because of the thermostat effect, banning risky activity will not work completely, and risk-seeking accompanies many aspects of everyday life. He spoke on this at the Shared Space conference held in Ipswich in June, 2005, where in his talk titled "Risk Compensation versus the obedient automaton theory of human behaviour" he discussed how understanding risk compensation was essential to the understanding of why shared space principles work for the design of public spaces such as road layouts in towns.

=== Hypermobility ===
He has also coined the term and written extensively on the phenomenon of hypermobility, particularly the misplaced belief that new road building solves traffic problems, rather than worsening them.

=== Climate change ===
Adams has not always voiced mainstream views on climate change. He has been critical of the Intergovernmental Panel on Climate Change (IPCC) and has praised 'reputable scientists who react sceptically to the "hockey stick" peddled by Sir John Houghton and the IPCC.'

=== Other ===
Adams was a member of the advisory committee to the Anti-Concorde Project. When working in central London he was a daily cyclist, occasionally writing on cycling issues.

== Bibliography ==
- Transport Planning, Vision and Practice, 1981. ISBN 0-7100-0844-9
- Risk and Freedom, The Record of Road Safety Regulation Transport Publishing Projects, 1985. ISBN 0-948537-05-1
- One False Move… A Study of Children’s Independent Mobility. (With M. Hillman and J.Whitelegg), Policy Studies Institute.
- Risk, UCL Press, 1995. ISBN 1-85728-068-7
- Cities at Risk: Living with Perils in the 21st Century (Joffe, Rossetto and Adams eds.). Springer, 2013.
