= Jean M. Bennett =

American physicist

- Born: 1930
- Died: July 18, 2008 (aged 77–78)
- Education: Pennsylvania State University
- Known for: The first woman president of The Optical Society
- Scientific career
- Fields: Physics
- Workplaces: Naval Air Warfare Center at China Lake

Jean M. Bennett (1930–2008) was an American physicist and the first woman president of The Optical Society in 1986. She received her PhD in physics from Pennsylvania State University in 1955, and spent most of her career at the Naval Weapons Center (now the Naval Air Warfare Center) at China Lake, CA.

== Career ==
Bennett received her PhD in physics from Pennsylvania State University in 1955, and spent most of her career at the Naval Weapons Center (now the Naval Air Warfare Center) at China Lake, CA. She died on July 18, 2008, in Ridgecrest, CA after a long illness. She was 78.

Bennett was an editor for Applied Optics and Optics Express.

In recognition of her contributions to the study of optical surfaces, OSA established the Jean Bennett Memorial Student Travel Grant.

== Awards and recognition ==
- In 1994 she was named a Distinguished Fellow of the Naval Weapons Center and won their L.T.E. Thompson Award for scientific achievements in optics technology in 1988.
- She received the David Richardson Medal from The Optical Society (OSA) in 1990 for her "sustained contributions to the studies of optical surfaces that have provided the optics community with a more thorough understanding of optical surface phenomenology and a meticulous methodology for surface characterization." She also became an OSA Fellow in 1972.
- In 1988 the Rose-Hulman Institute of Technology established the Jean Bennett Award, given annually to a senior for excellence in optics.
- She received the SPIE Technology Achievement Award in 1983 for "the development of practical instrumentation for optical surface quality metrology, and for dedicated service and guidance to the optics industry."

== See also ==
- Optical Society of America#Past Presidents of the OSA
