= John D. Strong =

American optical physicist

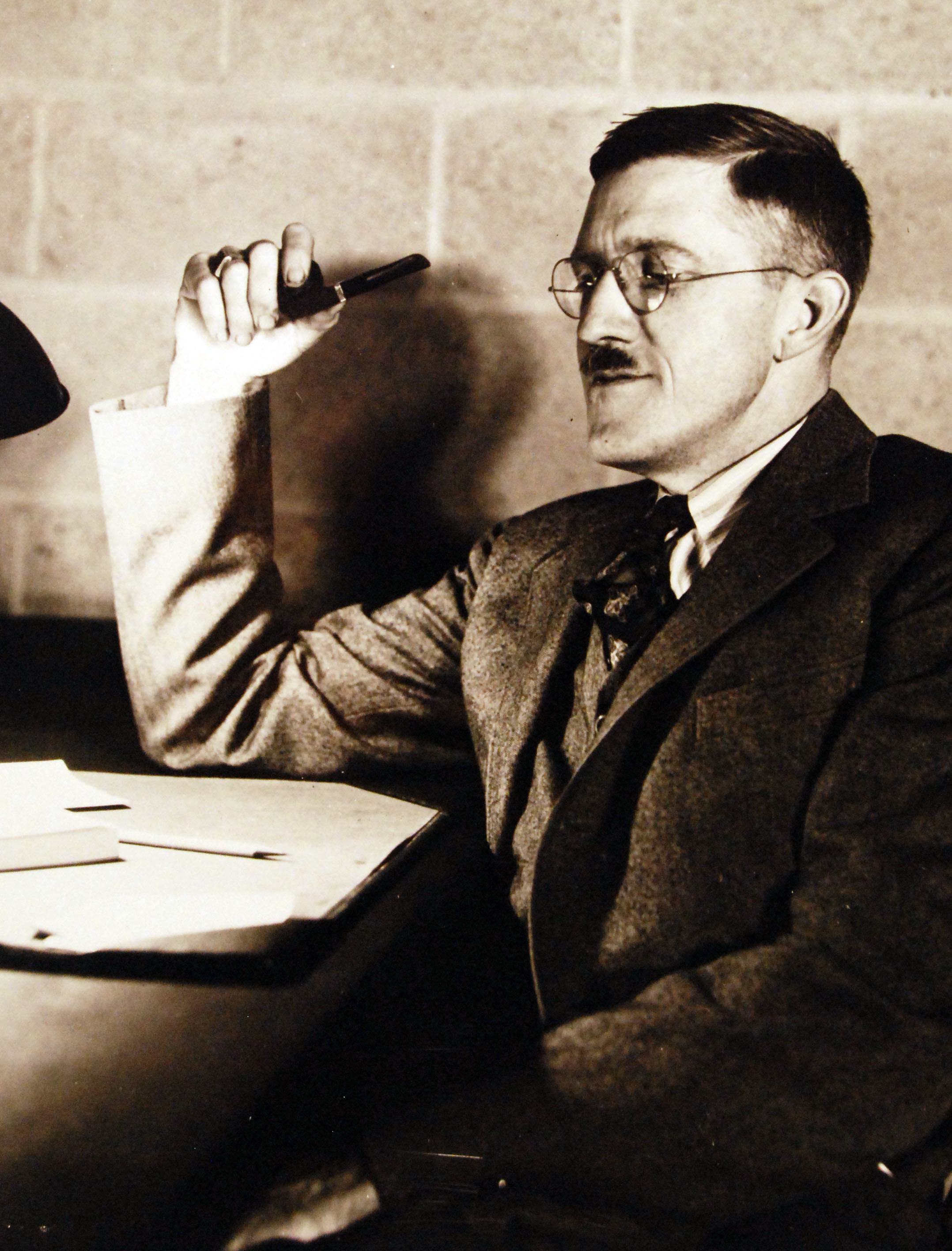
- John D. Strong
- Born: January 15, 1905; Riverdale, Kansas
- Died: March 28, 1992 (aged 87); Amherst, Massachusetts
- Education: University of Michigan
- Known for: Optics
- Awards: SPIE Gold Medal (1977)
- Scientific career
- Fields: Physics, Astronomy
- Workplaces: Caltech, Harvard, Johns Hopkins University
- Doctoral students: Martin Summerfield

John Donovan Strong (1905-1992) was an American physicist and astronomer. One of the world's foremost optical scientists of his day, Strong was known for being the first to detect water vapor in the atmosphere of Venus and for developing a number of innovations in optical devices, ranging from improved telescope mirrors to anti-reflective coatings for optical elements and diffraction gratings.

== Career ==
Born in Lawrence, Kansas in 1905, Strong received degrees from the University of Kansas (BA 1926) and the University of Michigan (M.S., 1928, Ph.D., 1930). After twelve years at Caltech and wartime research at Harvard on infrared systems, Strong became professor and director of the Astrophysics and Physical Meteorology Laboratories at Johns Hopkins University in 1946, where, among many other projects, he conducted research on balloon astronomy for the Office of Naval Research (ONR). He retired in 1981. Strong died of pancreatic cancer in 1992.

== Research ==
Strong published hundreds of papers throughout his career and was author of Procedures in Experimental Physics, a standard physics textbook for many years. Strong served as president of the American Optical Association in 1959 and patented numerous inventions for optics in spectroscopy as well as golf (see US patent 3720467A).

== Awards ==
Strong won Longstreth and Levy Medals from the Franklin Institute and OSA's Frederic Ives Medal. He was later elected a Fellow in OSA's inaugural Fellows class in 1959 and an Honorary member in 1981.

== Selected publications ==
- Strong, John (1 January 1986). Procedures in Experimental Physics (1986th ed.). Lindsay Pubns. ISBN 978-0-917914-56-0.
- Strong, John (15 January 2004). Concepts of Classical Optics (2004th ed.). Dover Publications. ISBN 978-0-486-43262-5.
- Strong, John (28 October 1989). Procedures in Applied Optics (1st ed.). Marcel Dekker, Inc. ISBN 978-0-8247-7987-0.

== See also ==
- Optica (society)#Presidents
