= Current Optics and Photonics =

- Discipline: Optics, Photonics, Quantum Electronics, Displays, Lithography, Biophotonics
- Language: English
- Edited by: Min-Kyo Seo

Publication details
- Former name: Journal of the Optical Society of Korea (JOSK)
- History: 1997–present
- Publisher: Optical Society of Korea (Republic of Korea)
- Frequency: Bimonthly
- Open access: Yes
- License: CC BY-NC
- Impact factor: 0.8 (2024)

Standard abbreviations
- ISO 4: Curr. Opt. Photonics

Indexing
- ISSN: 2508-7266 (print); 2508-7274 (web)

Links
- Journal homepage; Online access; Online archive

Current Optics and Photonics is a peer-reviewed and open access scientific journal published bimonthly by the Optical Society of Korea. Current Optics and Photonics started in February 2017, maintaining the tradition of the Journal of the Optical Society of Korea (JOSK) that had been published as one of the official journals of the OSK since 1997.

It covers fundamental and applied research in optics and photonics, and current editor-in-chief is Min-Kyo Seo (KAIST).

It is also available via Optics Publishing in partnership with Optica.

== Main Topic ==
- Optical Science
- Optical Technology
- Digital Holography and Information Optics
- Quantum Electronics
- Photonics
- Biophotonics
- Displays
- Quantum Optics and Quantum Information
- Lithography/Optical Materials

== Partnership with ==
Optica

== Abstracting and indexing ==
The journal is abstracted and indexed in:

- EBSCO databases
- Ei Compendex
- Science Citation Index Expanded
- Scopus
- Korea Citation Index

According to the Journal Citation Reports, the journal has a 2024 impact factor of 0.8.

== Archiving and Preservation ==
Current Optics and Photonics archives data from the following:

- Korea Science Published by KISTI
- Online Arching and Serving Internet Sources (OASIS) by National Library of Korea
- Open Access Korea (OAK) by National Library of Korea
- National Assembly Library of Korea
