= Alexander Eugen Conrady =

Optical designer, academician, and textbook author

Alexander Eugen Conrady (January 27, 1866 – June 16, 1944) was an optical designer, academician, and textbook author.

== Ancestry ==
The Conrady family had long lived in Germany near the border with the Netherlands, as A. E. Conrady records in an autobiographical account, augmented and published by his daughter Hilda Conrady Kingslake. His paternal male ancestors from at least the 17th century up to the time of his father had been headmasters in the school of the town of Uedem. His father, after beginning in that profession, turned to private business and the establishment of factories in the textile trade.

The family name had originally employed the Germanic spelling of "Conradi." Later, perhaps in the 18th century, his was later altered to Conradij to conform with Dutch spelling, and A. E. Conrady himself employed this form of the name until World War I.

Conrady knew less about his maternal ancestors, though he mentions that his maternal grandfather had been a distiller by the name of Scriverius, and that his mother (Mathilde) had been educated in his paternal grandfather's school, and then sent to a finishing school in the upper Rhine region for a year. His father acted as music teacher to his mother before they married in 1859. The couple settled in Burscheid, Germany, where his father had obtained the headmastership of a local school.

== Early life and education ==
Here A. E. Conrady was born in 1866 in Burscheid, Kingdom of Prussia. After attending school in Burscheid and Barmen, Germany, he proceeded to Bonn University in 1884, where he studied science and mathematics under Rudolf Lipschitz, Rudolf Clausius, Eduard Schönfeld, and August Kekulé. In 1886, his father persuaded him to leave the university and sent him to England to act as his agent with Stanfield, Brown and Co., learning how to set up button-sewing machines so that he might then return to Germany and supervise their erection there.

In 1887, Conrady returned to Bonn. He worked with the organic chemist, Otto Wallach, who won a Nobel Prize in chemistry in 1910. Conrady published his first two scientific papers (on chemistry) during this period.

== Emigration to England ==
Conrady's health was always delicate. Already in his early twenties, as his daughter Hilda records, he had suffered several health "breakdowns." These in conjunction with "a growing distaste for the existing German regime"—i.e., the militaristic German Empire under the Hohenzollern Kaisers—led him to abandon an academic career in Germany for travel and residence abroad. At the behest of George W. Brown of Stanfield, Brown and Co., Conrady travelled to North America and in 1896 to South Africa. Business ventures of his own in the manufacture of electrical equipment and model-making did not succeed, but by way of them in the 1890s he found his ultimate calling in the study of microscope and telescope optics, at first as a diversion and hobby.

Conrady finally settled in England, where he married Annie Bunney in 1901 and became a naturalized citizen in 1902. His daughter, Hilda, records that he "remained to the end a loyal and almost fanatically devoted citizen of his adopted country." During this period he finally abandoned his business ventures and went to work for Messrs. W. Watson and Son as a scientific adviser and lens designer. And the first of his four daughters was soon born. Perhaps as a result of this career-change and new-found domestic happiness, his bibliographic output increased dramatically, and by 1910 he had published thirteen papers on optics, astronomy, and spectroscopy. Fully ten of these papers (some of fundamental importance) appeared in 1904–1905.

== Work in optical design ==
Conrady himself records in the preface to his magnum opus, Applied Optics and Optical Design, that his optical work during these years led to "a large number of new types of telescopic, microscopic, and photographic lens systems...followed during the great war by the design of most of the new forms of submarine periscopes and of some other Service instruments." The success of this work led to his appointment in 1917 to the principal teaching post of the newly founded Technical Optics Department at the Imperial College of Science, Technology and Medicine in London, a position he occupied until 1931.

Conrady's teaching proved seminal, since he was able to take the arcane and rather disorganized discipline of optical design and establish it on a systematic, didactic basis, applying many of his newly devised procedures and theoretical insights, e.g., the doctrine of the optical path length (OPL) and optical path difference (OPD), which he had published during the period from 1904 to 1920. Many important optical designers of the 20th century—most notably his son-in-law, Rudolf Kingslake, as well as his eldest daughter, Hilda Conrady Kingslake—received his instruction and utilized his methods.

== Applied Optics ==
By 1929, Conrady had published twenty-nine scientific papers, most of them relating to optical design. These along with his decade of university teaching and about 35 years of practical experience in optical design and manufacture led to the publication of his most important work, a book laying out the systematic basis for the practical design of all kinds of optical instruments: Applied Optics and Optical Design, (Oxford UP, 1929). The book became a classic—widely used and referred to—and although its computational methods have been totally superseded by modern computer "ray-tracing" lens-design programs, its theoretical and mathematical insights remain valid and the book continues in print today.

== Final years and death ==
Subsequently, Conrady planned and partially wrote a second volume. But the disruptions of life in London during World War II, along with his own ill health, prevented Conrady from finishing the work. He died in 1944 at the age of 78 in London. His younger daughter, Irene, carefully preserved his manuscript and other unpublished papers until after the war. It finally fell to Hilda Conrady Kingslake and her husband Rudolf Kingslake to edit and complete the manuscript, which they published as Applied Optics and Optical Design, part two (Dover, 1960).

Conrady was a fellow of the Royal Astronomical Society, the Royal Microscopical Society, the Quekett Microscopical Club, and Royal Photographic Society. This last awarded him its Traill-Taylor Medal in 1920. He also published a book entitled, Photography as a Scientific Implement, (New York, 1923).

== Works by Conrady ==
- A.E. Conrady, Applied Optics and Optical Design, (Oxford, 1929; reprinted as "part one" Dover, 1958).
- A.E. Conrady and R. Kingslake, Applied Optics and Optical Design, part two (Dover, 1960).

== Articles ==
- L.C. Martin, "Alexander Eugen Conrady" in Observatory 65 (1944), p. 247.
- R. Kingslake, "Alexander Eugen Conrady" in Monthly Notices of the Royal Astronomical Society 105, no. 2 (1945), p. 67–68.
- R. Kingslake and H. G. Kingslake, "Alexander Eugen Conrady, 1866–1944" in Applied Optics 5, no. 1 (January, 1966), pp. 176–178.
