= William Ewald =

American philosopher and legal scholar

William Ewald is an American philosopher and legal scholar. He is a professor of philosophy and the John J. O’Brien Professor of Comparative and International Law at the University of Pennsylvania Law School, where he is co-director of the Institute of Law & Philosophy. He serves on the editorial boards of the American Journal of Constitutional History and the American Journal of Comparative Law, and on the editorial council of The Journal of Comparative Law.

He graduated from Harvard University with a BA and an AM in 1976, Oxford University with a DPhil in Philosophy in 1978 under the supervision of Dana Scott, and Harvard Law School with a JD in 1981.

A significant portion of his work focuses on the life and output of US Supreme Court Justice James Wilson. In 2017, he gave the Salmon P. Chase Distinguished Lecture on the subject of Wilson at the Georgetown Center for the Constitution.

== Selected publications ==
- From Kant to Hilbert Vol. 1 & 2, Oxford University Press, 1996, ISBN 9-780-198-50535-8, 9-780-198-50536-5
- “Comparative Jurisprudence (I): What Was It like to Try a Rat?” University of Pennsylvania Law Review, vol. 143, pp. 1889-2149 (1995).
- "Comparative Jurisprudence (II): The Logic of Legal Transplants," American Journal of Comparative Law, vol. 43, pp. 489-510 (1995).
- "Unger's Philosophy: A Critical Legal Study," The Yale Law Journal, April, 1988, 665-756.
- "Intuitionistic Tense and Modal Logic," The Journal of Symbolic Logic, March, 1986. (D.Phil. thesis.)
