= Herman Krier =

American engineer

Herman Krier is an American engineer currently Emeritus Professor at University of Illinois at Urbana–Champaign and formerly the Richard W. Kritzer Distinguished Professor from 1998 to 2008.
