= G. Michael Morris =

G. Michael Morris was president of the Optical Society of America in 2002.

Morris received his B.S. degree with special distinction in engineering physics from the University of Oklahoma, and his M.S. and Ph.D. degrees in electrical engineering from the California Institute of Technology.

From 1979 to 1982, Morris was a scientist in optics at The Institute of Optics, University of Rochester. From 1982 to 2001, Morris was a professor at the Institute of Optics, where he supervised 22 doctoral and 5 masters dissertations.

He co-founded Rochester Photonics Corporation (RPC) in 1989. The firm specialized in the design, prototyping, and manufacturing of diffractive and micro-optics components and subsystems, and was acquired by Corning Incorporated in 1999. From February 1999 to December 31, 2002, Corning Rochester Photonics Corporation functioned as a wholly owned subsidiary of Corning Incorporated.

He founded Apollo Optical Systems LLC on December 31, 2002.

In May 2003, he co-founded RPC Photonics, Inc., which specializes in the design and development of optical elements and systems for display and illumination applications for commercial products, medical products and government systems.

Morris' research has spanned a wide variety of topics in statistical optics, optical information processing, automatic pattern recognition and diffractive and micro-optics technology.

He holds 17 U.S. patents, and has published more than 70 referred journal articles, 3 book chapters and numerous conference proceedings. He is the recipient of the 2005 Optical Society of America Joseph Fraunhofer/Robert M. Burley Prize; the 2002 Rochester Engineering Society’s Leo H. East Engineer of the Year Award; and the 1997 Rochester Chamber of Commerce Civic Award for Science and Technology. He is also an Honorary Member of the OSA, Rochester Section, and a Fellow of the Optical Society of America and SPIE. In 2016, he received OSA's Stephen D. Fantone Distinguished Service Award, and in 2020, the David Richardson Medal.

== See also ==
- Optical Society of America#Past Presidents of the OSA
