= Hilda Conrady Kingslake =

British-American optical engineer

- Born: Hilda Gertrude Conrady; February 16, 1902; London
- Died: February 14, 2003 (aged 100); Rochester, New York
- Known for: Researcher in the field of optics

Hilda Conrady Kingslake (born Hilda Gertrude Conrady, February 16, 1902 – February 14, 2003) was an English-American researcher in the field of optics.

== Early life ==
Hilda Gertrude Conrady was born in London, England, on 16 February 1902 the oldest of four sisters, her siblings were Doris, Rene, Mable.

== Education & Career ==
Kingslake was a student in the technical optics department of the Royal College of Science, Imperial College, London and graduated in 1923 as part of the first graduating class. She continued working in the department as a research scholar publishing on topics including the Foucault knife-edge test and primary spherical aberration. Her first paper the “Study of the significance of the foucault knife-edge test when applied to refracting systems” was published in 1924 in the Transactions of the Optical Society, London.

Kingslake made significant contributions to memorialising the history of optics with two important works. She was the author of the "History of the Optical Society of America, 1916-1966" published in the March 1966 issue of the Journal of the Optical Society of America (OSA). She also authored "The First 50 Years - the Institute of Optics 1929-1979."

Kingslake was an OSA Fellow and long-time member of the society.

== Family ==
Her father, A.E. Conrady, and husband, Rudolf Kingslake were also major figures in the research and instruction of optics; in fact both Hilda and Rudolf studied under Conrady at the Imperial College of Science and Technology in London.

The Kingslakes moved to Rochester, New York, in 1929 (just after their marriage) when Rudolf was offered a professorship at the University of Rochester. Both continued to live in Rochester until their deaths in February 2003—Hilda on the 14th and Rudolf on the 28th. She died just two days shy of her 101st birthday on 14 February 2003.

Hilda and Rudolf's joint papers are deposited in the University of Rochester's River Campus Libraries.
