= Floyd K. Richtmyer =

American physicist and academic (1881–1939)

Floyd Karker Richtmyer
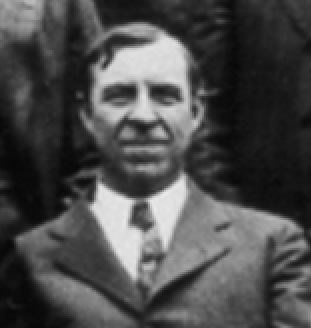
- Floyd K. Richtmyer, 1928
- Born: October 12, 1881; Cobleskill, New York
- Died: November 7, 1939 (aged 58)
- Education: Cornell University
- Scientific career
- Fields: Physics

Floyd Karker Richtmyer (October 12, 1881 – November 7, 1939) was a physicist and educator in the United States.

== Early life ==
Richtmyer was born October 12, 1881, in the rural community of Cobleskill, New York. He studied with Perley Nutting at Cornell University; both were students of Edward L. Nichols. Richtmyer graduated with his A.B. in 1904 and Ph.D. in 1910.

== Career ==
Richtmyer taught physics at Drexel University but returned to Cornell as an instructor in 1906, where he remained for the duration of his career. He became assistant professor of physics in 1911, full professor in 1918, and then dean of the graduate school in 1931. He also taught summer classes at the University of California, Berkeley, Stanford University, and Columbia University.

When the Journal of the Optical Society of America (JOSA) began in 1917, Richtmyer wrote the very first article, on page 1 of volume 1, titled "Opportunities for Research." In 1918 and 1919, he served as OSA’s vice president, and president in 1920. In 1928, he published a very popular textbook Introduction to Modern Physics.

Richtmyer is one of the founders of the Acoustical Society of America (ASA). with other renowned acousticians, at the Bell headquarters in New York City, on December 27, 1928. In 1933, he succeeded Paul Foote as editor of JOSA, and he served until his death. He published eleven articles in JOSA, mostly between 1922 and 1929.

== Honors ==
Richtmyer was an honorary member of Sigma Pi Sigma the physics honors society. He was elected a member of the United States National Academy of Sciences in 1932 and a member of both the American Philosophical Society and the American Academy of Arts and Sciences in 1935.

In 1929 he was awarded the Louis E. Levy Medal of the Franklin Institute for the study of X-rays.

The American Association of Physics Teachers, which he had helped form, established the Richtmyer Memorial Award, which is conferred annually and is typically given to educators who have made outstanding contributions as teachers in their fields. It is awarded to those who have not only produced important current research in physics but to those who have, by means of communication to both students and other educators, imparted information and motivation to participants in the field. Winners deliver the Richtmyer Memorial Lecture.

== Personal life ==
His son Robert Davis Richtmyer was also a physicist and mathematician. He had a daughter Sarah R. Richtmyer who married John T. Mann, and another son Lawson E. Richtmyer.

He died from a coronary thrombosis on November 7, 1939.

== See also ==
- Optical Society of America#Past Presidents of the OSA
