= Perley G. Nutting =

American optical physicist (1873–1949)

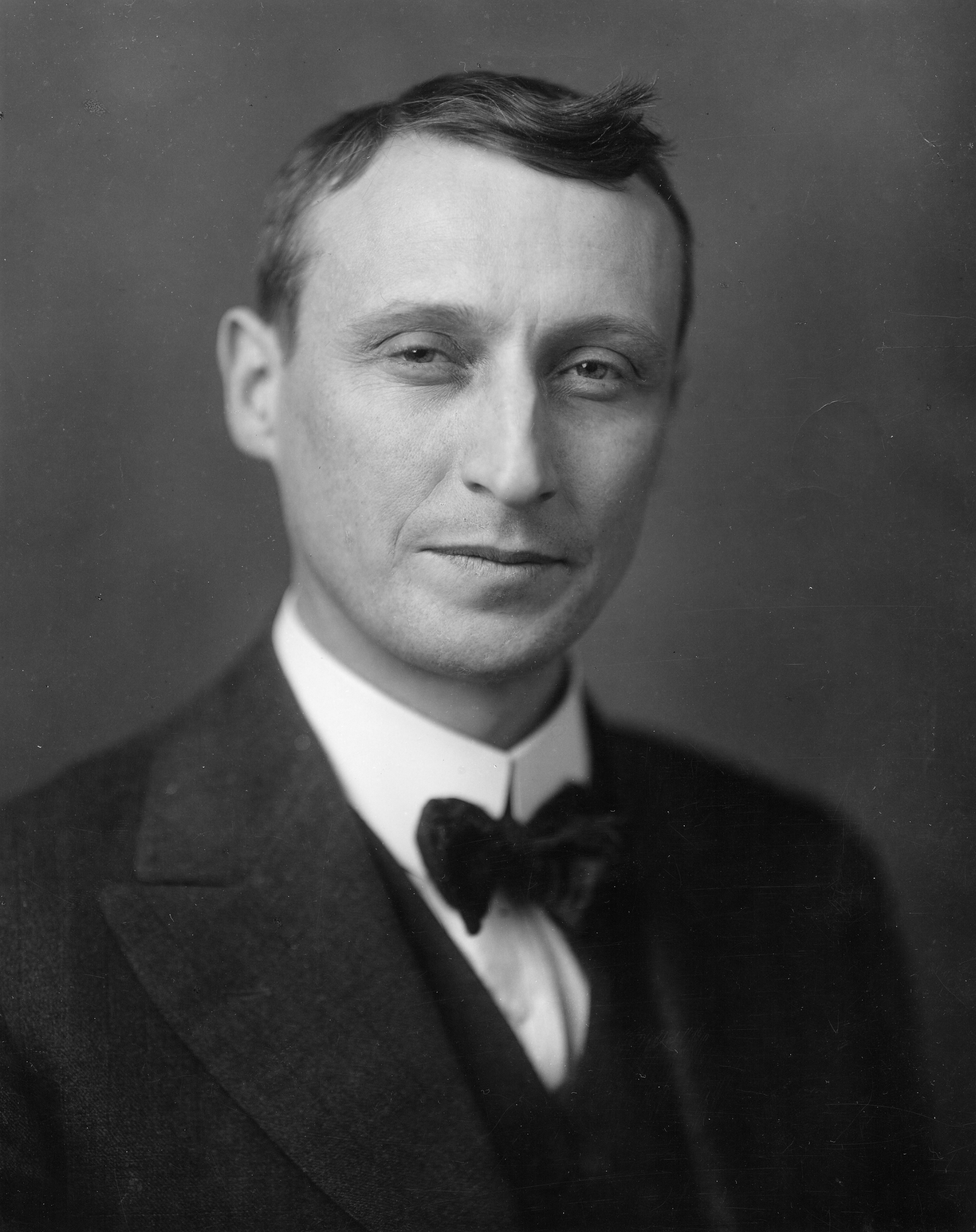
- Born: Perley Gilman Nutting; August 22, 1873; Randolph, Wisconsin, US
- Died: August 8, 1949 (aged 75)
- Education: Stanford University; University of California, Berkeley; Cornell University
- Known for: Founding the Optical Society of America
- Scientific career
- Fields: Physics; Optics
- Workplaces: National Bureau of Standards; Eastman Kodak Company; Westinghouse Electric Company; United States Geological Survey

Perley Gilman Nutting (1873–1949) was an American optical physicist and the founder of the Optical Society of America (OSA). He served as its first president from 1916 to 1917. OSA is now known as Optica.

Born August 22, 1873, in Randolph, Wisconsin, Nutting was a graduate of Stanford University (BA, 1897), the University of California, Berkeley (MA, 1899), and Cornell University (PhD, 1903). He joined the National Bureau of Standards as a physicist in 1903. It is claimed that in 1904, Nutting constructed one of the earliest, if not the first, neon sign, which was displayed at the 1904 Louisiana Purchase Exposition; however, this story has been disputed.

In 1910, Nutting joined the staff of Eastman Kodak Company prior to the arrival of Kodak's first research director Kenneth Mees, in 1912. He was the author of the 1912 book Outlines of Applied Optics, which called for an increased level of academic study in the applied optics field. In 1915, Nutting convened a series of meetings among Rochester, New York–based physicists that resulted in the founding of the OSA in January 1916.

Nutting moved from Kodak to Westinghouse Electric Company in 1917. In 1924 he returned to government work, moving to the United States Geological Survey where he remained until his retirement in 1943. He died August 8, 1949.

Nutting's son, Perley G. Nutting Jr., was the tireless grad student known as observer PGN for the demonstration of the MacAdam ellipse.
