= H. John Caulfield =

American physicist

H. John Caulfield (March 25, 1936 – January 31, 2012) was an American physicist who specialized in holography and optical computing. He was the author of numerous refereed publications, a Fellow of the Optical Society of America and the SPIE. He was also awarded the SPIE Gold Medal in 2005.

Caulfield did research at Texas Instruments and later became a professor at the University of Alabama in Huntsville. Towards the end of his career he taught at Fisk University and at Alabama A&M University.
