= Rudolf Kingslake =

English academic, lens designer, and engineer

Rudolf Kingslake (born Rudolf Klickmann; August 28, 1903 – February 28, 2003) was an English academic, lens designer, and engineer.

== Early life and education ==
Kingslake was born in London, England in 1903 as Rudolf Klickmann. The latter is in all probability a re-transcription from Cyrillic of the traditional German-Jewish "Glückmann" meaning "lucky man". Kingslake studied optical design at the Imperial College of Science and Technology, under the eminent optical designer and theoretician Alexander Eugen Conrady, earning a master's degree, subsequently marrying Professor Conrady's eldest daughter, Hilda Conrady Kingslake, herself a prominent English-American researcher in the field of optics.

== Career ==
In 1929, Kingslake was invited to the United States to teach at the University of Rochester, where he founded the Institute of Applied Optics, now known as The Institute of Optics. In 1937, Kingslake became the head of Optical Design department of Eastman Kodak while continuing his teaching at the university.

In 1958, Kingslake and wife Hilda edited an unfinished manuscript by Conrady and published a sequel to Conrady's book, Applied Optics and Optical Design.

Since 1974, SPIE has awarded the Rudolf Kingslake Medal to recognize the most noteworthy original paper published in the society's journal, Optical Engineering.

Kingslake was active in The Optical Society, and served the Society's president in 1948-49. He received the Frederic Ives Medal in 1973 and was elected an Honorary Member of OSA in 1984. Both he and his wife were made Fellows of the Society; he was in the inaugural class of Fellows in 1959, and she was elected in 1966.

Rudolf Kingslake died on February 28, 2003, in Rochester, NY, at age 99, two weeks after the death of his wife, Hilda.

== Books by Kingslake ==
- Applied Optics and Optical Engineering
- Lenses in Photography: The Practical Guide to Optics for Photographers
- Optics in Photography
- Lens Design Fundamentals
- A History of the Photographic Lens
- Applied Optics and Optical Design, Part II by A.E. Conrady, edited by Hilda and Rudolf Kingslake
- Optical System Design
