= Optica (society) =

American scientific society for optics and photonics

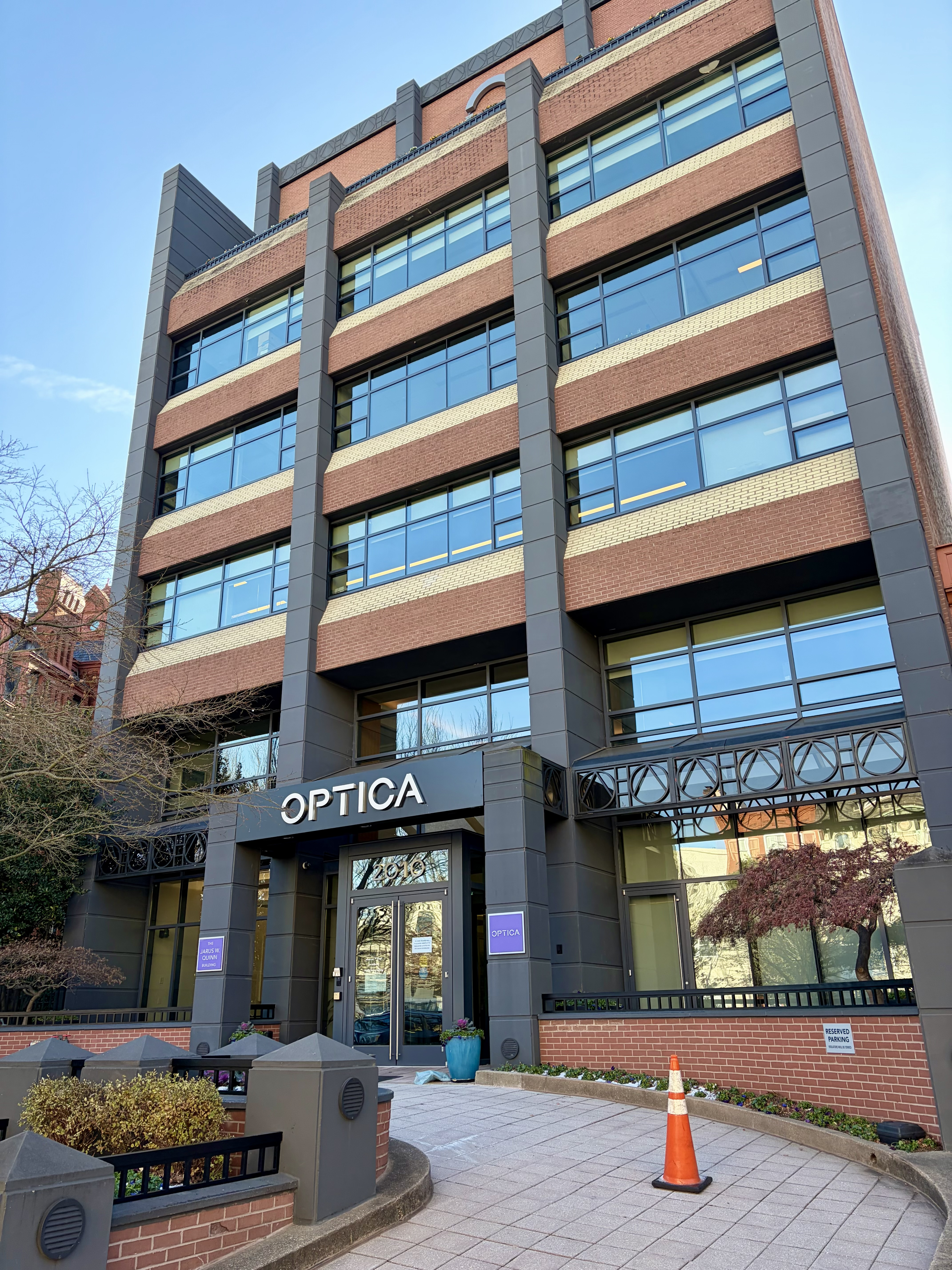
- Optica's headquarters in Washington, D.C.
- Founded: 1916; 110 years ago
- Founder: Perley G. Nutting
- Type: 501(c)(3) organization
- Tax ID no.: 53-0259696
- Purpose: Optics and photonics
- Location: Washington, D.C., United States
- Region served: Worldwide
- Method: Professional journals and conferences
- Members: 22,000
- Key people: James Kafka (2025 president); Gerd Leuchs (2024 president); Michal Lipson (2023 president)
- Revenue: $49,549,907
- Endowment: $74,991,615
- Employees: 150
- Website: www.optica.org
- Formerly called: Optical Society of America; Optical Society

Optica, founded as the Optical Society of America (later the Optical Society), is a professional society of individuals and companies with an interest in optics and photonics. It publishes journals, organizes conferences and exhibitions, and carries out charitable activities.

== History ==
Optica was founded in 1916 as the Optical Society of America, under the leadership of Perley G. Nutting, with 30 optical scientists and instrument makers based in Rochester, New York. It soon published its first journal of research results and established an annual meeting. The group's Journal of the Optical Society of America was created in 1918. The first series of joint meetings with the American Physical Society took place in 1918.

In 2008, it changed its name to the Optical Society. In September 2021, under the leadership of Elizabeth Rogan, the organization's name changed to Optica, in reference to the organization's journal by the same name and geographic neutrality to reflect the society's global membership.

In 2024, following an employee whistleblower complaint, Bloomberg News reported that the Optica Foundation Challenge was funded entirely by Huawei. In response, the United States House Committee on Science, Space, and Technology launched a probe. Despite a statement from 2024 Optica President Gerd Leuchs stating an independent investigation into the whistleblower complaint revealed "no violation of law was identified" and no further Congressional action, Optica announced that it would no longer accept money from Huawei, removed the company's representation on a panel of judges, returned donations made by Huawei from 2022 onward, and removed Elizabeth A. Rogan as CEO.

== Scientific publishing ==
Optica Publishing Group

Optica Publishing Group is Optica's scientific publishing platform, which publishes peer-reviewed optics and photonics research. Optica Publishing Group's portfolio consists of 20 publications.

=== Primary journals ===
- Advances in Optics and Photonics, ISSN 1943-8206; 2009–present — Publishing long review articles and tutorials.
- Applied Optics, ISSN 1559-128X (print); ISSN 2155-3165 (online); 1962–present — Covering optical applications-centered research.
- Biomedical Optics Express, ISSN 2156-7085; 2010–present — An open access journal covering optics, photonics and imaging in the life sciences.
- Journal of the Optical Society of America, 1917–1983, which was split into two journals in 1984:
  - Journal of the Optical Society of America A, ISSN 1084-7529 (print); ISSN 1520-8532 (online); 1984–present — Covering research on optics, image science, and vision.
  - Journal of the Optical Society of America B, ISSN 0740-3224 (print); ISSN 1520-8540 (online); 1984–present — Covering research on optical physics
- Optica, ISSN 2334-2536; 2014–present — Rapid dissemination of high-impact results in all areas of optics and photonics.
- Optica Quantum, ISSN 2837-6714; 2023–present — An open access journal of high-impact results in quantum information science and technology enabled by optics.
- Optical Materials Express, ISSN 2159-3930; 2011–present — An open access journal covering advances in novel optical materials, their properties, modeling, synthesis and fabrication techniques.
- Optics Express, ISSN 1094-4087; 1997–present — An open access journal covering all areas of optics.
- Optics Letters, ISSN 0146-9592 (print); ISSN 1539-4794 (online); 1977–present — Providing rapid publication of short papers in all fields of optical science and technology.
- Optics Continuum, ISSN 2770-0208; 2022–present — An open access journal that publishes research articles meeting the standards for technical accuracy, scientific rigor, and presentation quality without judgment of impact or significance.

=== Partnered journals ===
- Applied Spectroscopy, 1951–present. Published by the Society for Applied Spectroscopy.
- Chinese Optics Letters, 2003–present. Published by Chinese Laser Press.
- Current Optics and Photonics, 2017–present. Published by Optical Society of Korea.
- Journal of Optical Communications and Networking, 2009–present. Jointly published by Optica and IEEE. Published from 2002 to 2009 as Journal of Optical Networking.
- Journal of Lightwave Technology, 1998–present. Jointly published by Optica and IEEE.
- Journal of Near Infrared Spectroscopy, 1993–present. Published by SAGE Publishing.
- Journal of Optical Technology, 1999–present. English translation of Opticheskii Zhurnal published by the S. I. Vavilov State Optical Institute.
- Photonics Research, 2013–present. Jointly published by Optica and Chinese Laser Press.

=== Magazine ===
- Optics and Photonics News, ISSN 1047-6938; 1975–present. Publishes monthly news for recent developments in optics on topics related to science and society, education, technology, and business.

=== Legacy journals ===
- Journal of Display Technology, 2005–2016. Jointly published by OSA and IEEE. Available online.
- Journal of Optical Networking, 2002–2009. Published by OSA. Available online.
- Journal of Optical Society of Korea, 2007–2016. Published by the Optical Society of Korea. Available online.
- OSA Continuum, 2018–2021. Published by Optica. Available online.
- Optics News, 1975–1989. Published by Optica. Available online.

== Recognitions ==
Optica presents awards and honors, including Optica Fellow, Honorary Membership, and Awards/Medals. Optica's awards and medals program is endowed through the Optica Foundation, and includes more than 20 named awards; among them are the following:

- Adolph Lomb Medal
- C.E.K. Mees Medal
- Charles Hard Townes Award
- David Richardson Medal
- Edgar D. Tillyer Award
- Edwin H. Land Medal
- Ellis R. Lippincott Award
- Emmett N. Leith Medal
- Esther Hoffman Beller Medal
- Frederic Ives Medal/Jarus W. Quinn Prize
- Herbert Walther Award
- James P. Gordon Memorial Speakership
- John Tyndall Award
- Joseph Fraunhofer Award/Robert M. Burley Prize
- Kevin P. Thompson Optical Design Innovator Award
- Leonard Mandel Quantum Optics Award
- Max Born Award
- Michael Stephen Feld Biophotonics Award
- Nick Holonyak, Jr. Award
- Paul F. Forman Team Engineering Excellence Award
- R. W. Wood Prize
- Robert E. Hopkins Leadership Award
- Sang Soo Lee Award
- Stephen D. Fantone Distinguished Service Award
- The Joseph W. Goodman Book Writing Award
- William F. Meggers Award in Spectroscopy

== Presidents ==
The following persons are or have been presidents of the society:

- 1916–1917: Perley G. Nutting
- 1918–1919: Frederick Eugene Wright
- 1920: Floyd K. Richtmyer
- 1921: James P. C. Southall
- 1922–1923: Leonard T. Troland
- 1924–1925: Herbert E. Ives
- 1926–1927: William E. Forsythe
- 1928–1929: Irwin G. Priest
- 1930–1931: Loyd A. Jones
- 1932: Eugene C. Crittenden
- 1933–1934: Wilbur B. Rayton
- 1935–1936: Arthur C. Hardy
- 1937–1938: Roswell Clifton Gibbs
- 1939–1940: Kasson S. Gibson
- 1941–1942: Archie G. Worthing
- 1943–1944: August H. Pfund
- 1945–1946: George R. Harrison
- 1947–1948: Rudolf Kingslake
- 1949–1950: William F. Meggers
- 1951–1952: Brian O'Brien
- 1953–1954: Deane B. Judd
- 1955–1957: Ralph A. Sawyer
- 1958: Irvine Clifton Gardner
- 1959: John D. Strong
- 1960: James G. Baker
- 1961: Wallace R. Brode
- 1962: David MacAdam
- 1963: Stanley S. Ballard
- 1964: Richard C. Lord
- 1965: Seibert Q. Duntley
- 1966: Van Zandt Williams
- 1967: John A. Sanderson
- 1968: Arthur F. Turner
- 1969: Karl G. Kessler
- 1970: W. Lewis Hyde
- 1971: Bruce H. Billings
- 1972: Aden B. Meinel
- 1973: Robert E. Hopkins
- 1974: F. Dow Smith
- 1975: Arthur L. Schawlow
- 1976: Boris P. Stoicheff
- 1977: Peter Franken
- 1978: Emil Wolf
- 1979: Dudley Williams
- 1980: Warren J. Smith
- 1981: Anthony J. DeMaria
- 1982: Robert P. Madden
- 1983: Kenneth M. Baird
- 1984: Donald R. Herriott
- 1985: Robert R. Shannon
- 1986: Jean M. Bennett
- 1987: Robert G. Greenler
- 1988: William B. Bridges
- 1989: Herwig Kogelnik
- 1990: Richard L. Abrams
- 1991: John N. Howard
- 1992: Joseph W. Goodman
- 1993: Elsa M. Garmire
- 1994: Robert L. Byer
- 1995: Tingye Li
- 1996: Duncan T. Moore
- 1997: Janet S. Fender
- 1998: Gary C. Bjorklund
- 1999: Anthony E. Siegman
- 2000: Erich P. Ippen
- 2001: Richard C. Powell
- 2002: Anthony M. Johnson
- 2003: G. Michael Morris
- 2004: Peter L. Knight
- 2005: Susan Houde-Walter
- 2006: Eric Van Stryland
- 2007: Joseph H. Eberly
- 2008: Rod C. Alferness
- 2009: Thomas M. Baer
- 2010: James C. Wyant
- 2011: Christopher Dainty
- 2012: Tony Heinz
- 2013: Donna Strickland
- 2014: Philip H. Bucksbaum
- 2015: Philip St. John Russell
- 2016: Alan E. Willner
- 2017: Eric Mazur
- 2018: Ian Walmsley
- 2019: Ursula Gibson
- 2020: Stephen D. Fantone
- 2021: Constance J. Chang-Hasnain
- 2022: Satoshi Kawata
- 2023: Michal Lipson
- 2024: Gerd Leuchs
- 2025: James Kafka
- 2026: Gisele Bennett

== Notable people ==
- Hilda Conrady Kingslake, optics researcher, author of the "History of the Optical Society of America, 1916-1966" and "The First 50 Years — the Institute of Optics 1929-1979."
- Delwin Lindsey, editor of the society journal

== See also ==
- American Institute of Physics
- American Physical Society
- European Optical Society
- European Photonics Industry Consortium
- International Commission for Optics
- Optical Society of London
- Optics Classification and Indexing Scheme
- Society for Imaging Science and Technology
- SPIE
