= Journal of the Optical Society of America =

Peer-reviewed scientific journal

- Discipline: Optics
- Language: English
- Edited by: Olga Korotkova; Kurt Busch

Publication details
- History: 1917–present
- Publisher: Optica
- Frequency: Monthly
- Open access: Hybrid
- Impact factor: J. Opt. Soc. Am. A: 1.5; J. Opt. Soc. Am. B: 1.9; (2025)

Standard abbreviations
- ISO 4: J. Opt. Soc. Am.

Indexing
- J. Opt. Soc. Am. A
- ISSN: 1084-7529 (print); 1520-8532 (web)
- J. Opt. Soc. Am. B
- ISSN: 0740-3224 (print); 1520-8540 (web)

Links
- JOSA A website; JOSA B website; JOSA online access; JOSA A online access; JOSA B online access

The Journal of the Optical Society of America is a peer-reviewed scientific journal of optics, published by Optica. It was established in 1917 and in 1984 was split into two parts, A and B.

== Journal of the Optical Society of America A ==
Part A covers various topics in optics, vision, and image science. The editor-in-chief is Olga Korotkova (University of Miami, USA).

== Journal of the Optical Society of America B ==
Part B covers various topics in the field of optical physics, such as guided waves, laser spectroscopy, nonlinear optics, quantum optics, lasers, organic and polymer materials for optics, and ultrafast phenomena. The editor-in-chief is Kurt Busch (Humboldt University of Berlin, Germany).
