= Gabriel Popescu (scientist) =

American optical engineer (1971–2022)

- Popescu in 2015
- Born: October 24, 1971; Prundu, Giurgiu County, Romania
- Died: June 16, 2022 (aged 50); Prundu, Romania
- Citizenship: Romania; United States
- Education: University of Bucharest; University of Central Florida
- Known for: Quantitative phase-contrast microscopy
- Children: 2
- Scientific career
- Fields: Optics; Biophotonics
- Workplaces: Massachusetts Institute of Technology; University of Illinois Urbana-Champaign
- Thesis: Propagation of low-coherence fields in inhomogeneous media (2002)
- Doctoral advisor: Aristide Dogariu
- Other academic advisors: Michael Stephen Feld

Gabriel Popescu (October 24, 1971 – June 16, 2022) was an American optical engineer, who was the William L. Everitt Distinguished Professor in Electrical and Computer Engineering at University of Illinois Urbana-Champaign. He was best known for his work on biomedical optics and quantitative phase-contrast microscopy.

== Biography ==
Popescu was born on October 24, 1971, in Romania. He obtained bachelor's and master's degrees in physics from the University of Bucharest in 1995 and 1996, respectively. He further obtained a master's degree and a PhD in optics, in 1999 and 2002, respectively, from School of Optics at University of Central Florida. In 2002, he joined Massachusetts Institute of Technology as a postdoctoral researcher under the supervision of Michael Stephen Feld.

In 2007, Popescu joined the University of Illinois Urbana-Champaign as an assistant professor and established the Quantitative Light Imaging (QLI) Laboratory. At this institution, he was affiliated with the Electrical and Computer Engineering and Bioengineering departments, as well as with the Beckman Institute for Advanced Science and Technology. In 2009, he obtained American citizenship.

Popescu was an associate editor for Optics Express and Biomedical Optics Express and served as an editorial board member for Journal of Biomedical Optics and Scientific Reports. He was a Fellow of Optica, SPIE and American Institute for Medical and Biological Engineering. He is the author of the textbook Quantitative Phase Imaging of Cells and Tissues and editor of Nanobiophotonics, which were released respectively in 2010 and 2011. He is also the founder of the startup company Phi Optics, which focuses on the commercialization of quantitative phase-contrast microscopy.

On June 16, 2022, Popescu died in his native village of Prundu, after suffering a fatal motorcycle accident. He was survived by his wife Catherine Best-Popescu, a research assistant professor at University of Illinois Urbana-Champaign, and two children.

== Research ==
Popescu's research has focused on biomedical optics, optical microscopy and spectroscopy. He has been regarded as a pioneering figure in quantitative phase-contrast microscopy, which facilitates non-destructive and label-free imaging of biological samples. Respectively in 2006, 2010 and 2017, he introduced different extensions of this method: diffraction phase microscopy, spatial light interference microscopy and gradient light interference microscopy.

== Selected publications ==
Books

- Popescu, Gabriel, ed. (2010). Nanobiophotonics. McGraw-Hill. ISBN 9780071737012.
- Popescu, Gabriel (2011). Quantitative Phase Imaging of Cells and Tissues. McGraw-Hill. ISBN 9780071663427.

Journal articles

- Popescu, Gabriel; Deflores, Lauren P.; Vaughan, Joshua C.; Badizadegan, Kamran; Iwai, Hidenao; Dasari, Ramachandra R.; Feld, Michael S. (2004). "Fourier phase microscopy for investigation of biological structures and dynamics". Optics Letters. 29 (21): 2503–2505. Bibcode:2004OptL...29.2503P. doi:10.1364/OL.29.002503. PMID 15584275.
- Ikeda, Takahiro; Popescu, Gabriel; Dasari, Ramachandra R.; Feld, Michael S. (2005). "Hilbert phase microscopy for investigating fast dynamics in transparent systems". Optics Letters. 30 (10): 1165–1167. Bibcode:2005OptL...30.1165I. doi:10.1364/OL.30.001165. PMID 15945142.
- Popescu, Gabriel; Ikeda, Takahiro; Dasari, Ramachandra R.; Feld, Michael S. (2006). "Diffraction phase microscopy for quantifying cell structure and dynamics". Optics Letters. 31 (6): 775–777. Bibcode:2006OptL...31..775P. doi:10.1364/OL.31.000775. PMID 16544620.
- Park, YongKeun; Diez-Silva, Monica; Popescu, Gabriel; Lykotrafitis, George (2008). "Refractive index maps and membrane dynamics of human red blood cells parasitized by Plasmodium falciparum". Proceedings of the National Academy of Sciences. 105 (37): 13730–13735. Bibcode:2008PNAS..10513730P. doi:10.1073/pnas.0806100105. PMC 2529332. PMID 18772382.
- Wang, Zhuo; Millet, Larry; Mir, Mustafa; Ding, Huafeng; Unarunotai, Sakulsuk; Rogers, John; Gillette, Martha U.; Popescu, Gabriel (2011). "Spatial light interference microscopy (SLIM)". Optics Express. 19 (2): 1016–1026. Bibcode:2011OExpr..19.1016W. doi:10.1364/OE.19.001016. PMC 3482902. PMID 21263640.
- Nguyen, Tan H.; Kandel, Mikhail E.; Rubessa, Marcello; Wheeler, Matthew B.; Popescu, Gabriel (2017). "Gradient light interference microscopy for 3D imaging of unlabeled specimens". Nature Communications. 8 (1): 210. Bibcode:2017NatCo...8..210N. doi:10.1038/s41467-017-00190-7. PMC 5547102. PMID 28785013.
- Park, YongKeun; Depeursinge, Christian; Popescu, Gabriel (2018). "Quantitative phase imaging in biomedicine". Nature Photonics. 12 (10): 578–589. Bibcode:2018NaPho..12..578P. doi:10.1038/s41566-018-0253-x. S2CID 256704142.
