= Yoav Shechtman =

Israeli physicist

- יואב שכטמן
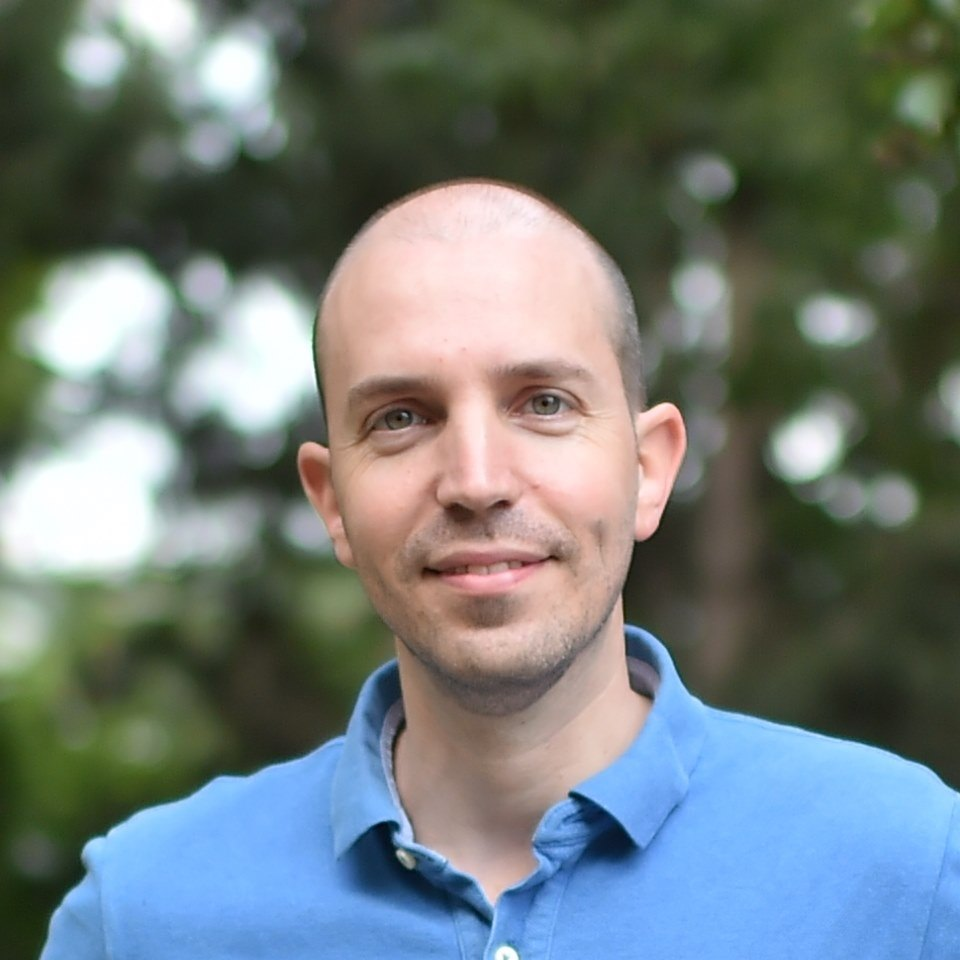
- Shechtman in 2018
- Born: 17 March 1980 (age 46); Haifa, Israel
- Education: Technion; Stanford University
- Known for: Nanobiotechnology; super-resolution microscopy
- Spouse: Tamar Navrotsky Shechtman
- Scientific career
- Fields: Biomedical Engineering
- Workplaces: Technion; University of Texas
- Doctoral advisors: Mordechai Segev; Yonina Eldar
- Other academic advisors: William E. Moerner

Yoav Shechtman (Hebrew: יואב שכטמן; born March 17, 1980) is an Israeli physicist and engineer. He heads the Nano-Bio-Optics lab at the Technion – Israel Institute of Technology.

== Early life and education ==
Yoav Shechtman was born on March 17, 1980, to Zipora and Dan Shechtman and spent his childhood growing up in Haifa.

Shechtman holds a BSc in physics and electrical engineering (2007) and a PhD in physics (2013) from the Technion. He later completed a postdoc at Stanford University (2016), developing super-resolution microscopy methods with W.E. Moerner.

== Academic career ==
Since October 2016, Shechtman is a faculty member in the Technion-Israel Institute of Technology where he currently heads the Nano-Bio-Optics lab.

In 2018, Shechtman and his team at the Technion developed an efficient method for bio imaging in super resolution.

In 2021, Shechtman, in collaboration with Reut Orange-Kedem, developed a cheap and more efficient method for the production of more precise optical components.

From September 2023 – 2024, Shechtman was a Harrington Faculty Fellow at The University of Texas at Austin.

In May 2025, Shechtman was selected as a member of the Israel Young Academy.

== Awards ==
- 2016 Technion Career Advancement Chair
- 2017 Zuckerman Faculty Scholar
- 2018 Early Career Award of the International Association for Medical and Biological Engineering (IAMBE)
- 2018 European Research Council starting grant
- 2019 Uzi and Michal Halevy Award for Innovative Applied Engineering
- 2020 IUPAB Young Investigator Medal and Prize
- 2021 Krill Prize
- 2024 European Research Council Proof of Concept (ERC PoC) grants .2

== Published works ==
- Boris Ferdman, Elias Nehme, Lucien E. Weiss, Reut Orange, Onit Alalouf & Yoav Shechtman (2020). "VIPR: vectorial implementation of phase retrieval for fast and accurate microscopic pixel-wise pupil estimation". Optics Express. 28 (7): 10179–10198. Bibcode:2020OExpr..2810179F. doi:10.1364/OE.388248. PMID 32225609. S2CID 214731058.
- Naor Granik, Lucien E. Weiss, Elias Nehme, Maayan Levin, Michael Chein, Eran Perlson, Yael Roichman & Yoav Shechtman (2019). "Single-Particle Diffusion Characterization by Deep Learning". Biophysical Journal. 117 (2): 185–192. Bibcode:2019BpJ...117..185G. doi:10.1016/j.bpj.2019.06.015. PMC 6701009. PMID 31280841.
- Eran Hershko, Lucien E. Weiss, Tomer Michaeli & Yoav Shechtman. "Multicolor localization microscopy and point-spread-function engineering by deep learning". Optics Express.
- Boris Ferdman, Lucien E. Weiss, Onit Alalouf, Yonathan Haimovich & Yoav Shechtman. "Ultrasensitive Refractometry via Supercritical Angle Fluorescence". ACS Nano.
- Mikael P. Backlund, Yoav Shechtman & Ronald L. Walsworth (2018). "Fundamental Precision Bounds for Three-Dimensional Optical Localization Microscopy with Poisson Statistics". Physical Review Letters. 121 (2) 023904. arXiv:1803.01776. Bibcode:2018PhRvL.121b3904B. doi:10.1103/PhysRevLett.121.023904. PMID 30085695. S2CID 13671480.
- Anna-Karin Gustavsson, Petar N. Petrov, Maurice Y. Lee, Yoav Shechtman & W. E. Moerner (2018). Koberling, Felix; Erdmann, Rainer; Gryczynski, Zygmunt K; Gregor, Ingo; Enderlein, Jörg (eds.). "Tilted light sheet microscopy with 3D point spread functions for single-molecule super-resolution imaging in mammalian cells". Proceedings of SPIE--The International Society for Optical Engineering. 10500: 105000M. Bibcode:2018SPIE10500E..0MG. doi:10.1117/12.2288443. ISBN 978-1-5106-1485-7. PMC 5906058. PMID 29681676.
- Anna-Karin Gustavsson, Petar N. Petrov, Maurice Y. Lee, Yoav Shechtman & W. E. Moerner. "3D single-molecule super-resolution microscopy with a tilted light sheet". Nature Communications.
- Yoav Shechtman, Anna-Karin Gustavsson, Petar N. Petrov, Elisa Dultz, Maurice Y. Lee, Karsten Weis & W. E. Moerner. "Observation of live chromatin dynamics in cells via 3D localization microscopy using Tetrapod point spread functions". Biomedical Optics Express.
- Petar N. Petrov, Yoav Shechtman & W. E. Moerner (2017). "Measurement-based estimation of global pupil functions in 3D localization microscopy". Optics Express. 25 (7): 7945–7959. arXiv:1705.09694. Bibcode:2017OExpr..25.7945P. doi:10.1364/OE.25.007945. PMC 5810908. PMID 28380911. S2CID 4417690.
- Alex von Diezmann, Yoav Shechtman & W. E. Moerner. "Three-Dimensional Localization of Single Molecules for Super-Resolution Imaging and Single-Particle Tracking". Chemical Reviews.
- Yoav Shechtman, Lucien E. Weiss, Adam S. Backer, Maurice Y. Lee & W. E. Moerner. "Multicolour localization microscopy by point-spread-function engineering". Nature Photonics.
- W. E. Moerner, Yoav Shechtman & Quan Wang (physicist) (2015). "Single-molecule spectroscopy and imaging over the decades". Faraday Discussions. 184: 9–36. Bibcode:2015FaDi..184....9M. doi:10.1039/c5fd00149h. PMC 4782608. PMID 26616210.
- Pavel Sidorenko, Ofer Kfir, Yoav Shechtman, Avner Fleischer, Yonina C. Eldar, Mordechai Segev & Oren Cohen (2015). "Sparsity-based super-resolved coherent diffraction imaging of one-dimensional objects". Nature Communications. 6 8209. Bibcode:2015NatCo...6.8209S. doi:10.1038/ncomms9209. PMC 4569841. PMID 26345495. S2CID 10141754.
- Maor Mutzafi, Yoav Shechtman, Yonina C. Eldar, Oren Cohen & Mordechai Segev (2015). "Sparsity-based Ankylography for Recovering 3D molecular structures from single-shot 2D scattered light intensity". Nature Communications. 6 7950. Bibcode:2015NatCo...6.7950M. doi:10.1038/ncomms8950. PMC 4560757. PMID 26289358. S2CID 15420365.
- Yoav Shechtman, Lucien E. Weiss, Adam S. Backer, Steffen J. Sahl & W. E. Moerner (2015). "Precise Three-Dimensional Scan-Free Multiple-Particle Tracking over Large Axial Ranges with Tetrapod Point Spread Functions". Nano Letters. 15 (6): 4194–4199. Bibcode:2015NanoL..15.4194S. doi:10.1021/acs.nanolett.5b01396. PMC 4462996. PMID 25939423. S2CID 18140666.
- Yoav Shechtman, Steffen J. Sahl, Adam S. Backer & W. E. Moerner (2014). "Optimal point spread function design for 3D imaging". Physical Review Letters. 113 (13) 133902. Bibcode:2014PhRvL.113m3902S. doi:10.1103/PhysRevLett.113.133902. PMC 4381866. PMID 25302889.
- Yoav Shechtman, Eran Small, oav Lahini, Mor Verbin, Yonina C. Eldar, Yaron Silberberg & Mordechai Segev (2013). "Sparsity-based super-resolution and phase-retrieval in waveguide arrays". Optics Express. 21 (20) 24015. Bibcode:2013OExpr..2124015S. doi:10.1364/OE.21.024015. PMID 24104311. S2CID 17744465.
- Yoav Shechtman, Yonina C. Eldar, Oren Cohen & Mordechai Segev (2013). "Efficient coherent diffractive imaging for sparsely varying objects". Optics Express. 21 (5): 6327–6338. Bibcode:2013OExpr..21.6327S. doi:10.1364/OE.21.006327. PMID 23482202.
- Robert Keil, Yoav Lahini, Yoav Shechtman, Matthias Heinrich, ami Pugatch, Felix Dreisow, Andreas Tunnermann, Stefan Nolte & Alexander Szameit (2012). "Perfect imaging through a disordered waveguide lattice". Optics Letters. 37 (5): 809–811. Bibcode:2012OptL...37..809K. doi:10.1364/OL.37.000809. PMID 22378401.
- Yoav Shechtman, Yonina C. Eldar, Alexander Szameit & Mordechai Segev (2011). "Sparsity based sub-wavelength imaging with partially incoherent light via quadratic compressed sensing". Optics Express. 19 (16) 14807. arXiv:1104.4406. Bibcode:2011OExpr..1914807S. doi:10.1364/OE.19.014807. PMID 21934842. S2CID 2132771.
- Yoav Shechtman, nir Gazit, Alexander Szameit, Yonina C. Eldar & Mordechai Segev (2010). "Super-resolution and reconstruction of sparse images carried by incoherent light". Optics Letters. 35 (8): 1148–1150. Bibcode:2010OptL...35.1148S. doi:10.1364/OL.35.001148. PMID 20410948.

== See also ==
- Science and technology in Israel
