= Gabriel Popescu =

Gabriel Popescu may refer to:

- Gabriel Popescu (footballer) (born 1973), Romanian footballer
- Gabriel Popescu (scientist) (1971—2022), Romanian-American scientist

== See also ==
- Gabriel–Popescu theorem
