= Choi Wonshik =

South Korean physicist

- 최원식
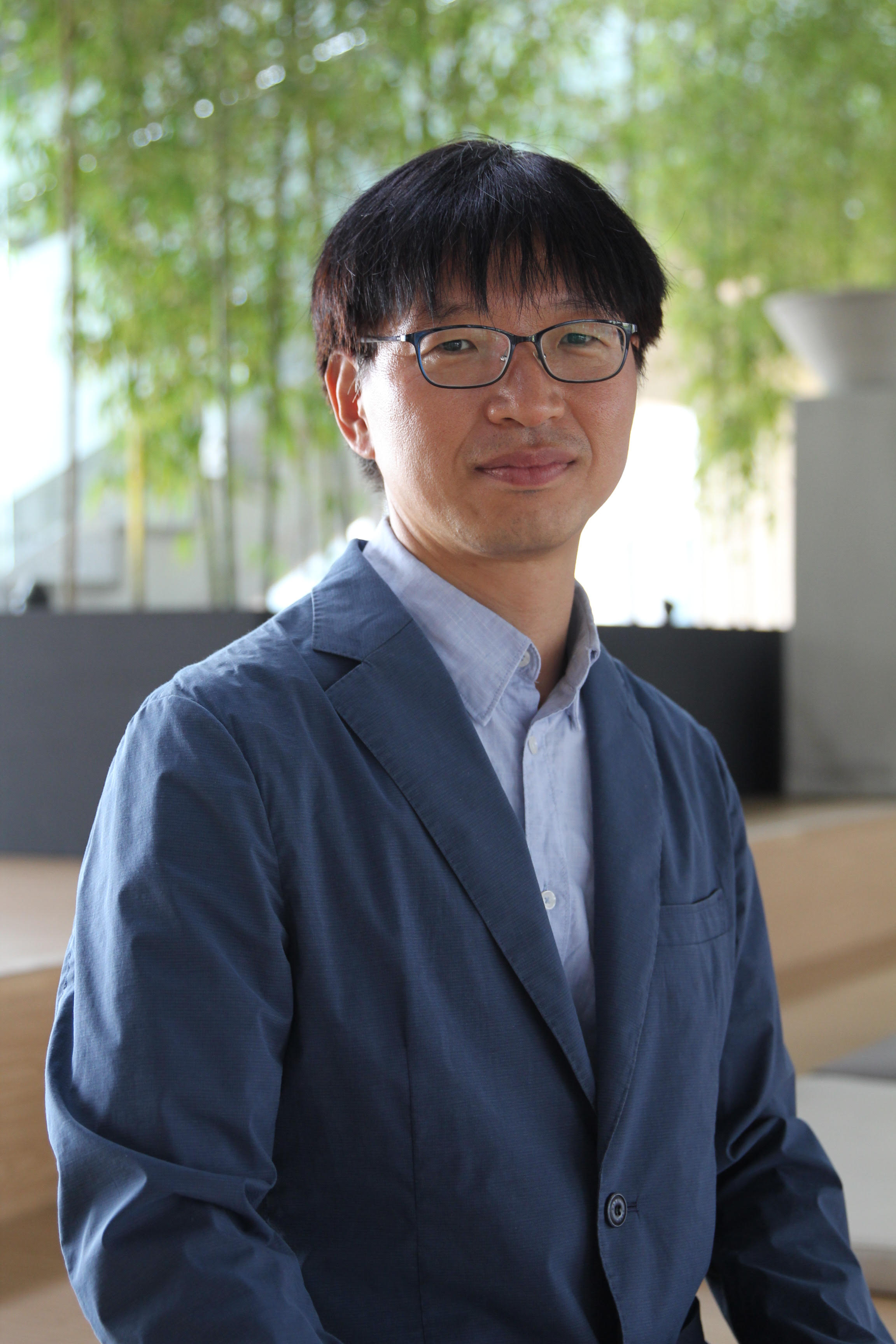
- Education: Seoul National University
- Known for: Tomographic phase microscopy
- Scientific career
- Fields: Physics, optical physics, optical microscopy, deep-tissue imaging, imaging through scattering media
- Workplaces: Institute for Basic Science, Korea University, Massachusetts Institute of Technology, Seoul National University
- Theses: Observation of Polarization Beat by Time-Delayed Four Wave Mixing (1999); Nonclassical photon statistics in the many-atom microlaser (2004)
- Doctoral advisor: An Kyungwon (안경원)
- Other academic advisors: Lee Jai-Hyung (이재형)

Korean name
- Hangul: 최원식
- Hanja: 崔院植
- RR: Choe Wonsik
- MR: Ch'oe Wŏnsik
- Website: Super-depth Imaging Lab

Choi Wonshik (Korean: 최원식) is an optical physicist researching deep-tissue imaging and imaging through scattering media. He is a full professor in the Department of Physics of Korea University where he serves as the associate director at the IBS Center for Molecular Spectroscopy and Dynamics. Inside the Center, he leads the Super-depth Imaging Lab. He has been cited more than 4,000 times and has an h-index of 32. He is a fellow of The Optical Society and the Korean Academy of Science and Technology.

== Education ==
Choi majored in physics and received his B.S., M.S., and Ph.D. from the Department of Physics of Seoul National University in 1997, 1999, and 2004, respectively. His M.S. adviser was Professor Lee Jai-Hyung (이재형) and doctoral adviser was Professor An Kyungwon (안경원). His field of study for his doctorate was atomic and laser physics.

== Career ==
He held two postdoc research positions with the first taking place in the Department of Physics at Seoul National University. During his doctorate program and first postdoc position, Choi observed that the cavity-QED microlaser system at MIT exhibits sub-Poisson photon statistics by measuring the second-order correlation which experimentally proved that the microlaser is a nonclassical source; a long-standing theoretical prediction. The second position was in the Michael S. Feld Group in the George R. Harrison Spectroscopy Laboratory of MIT for a period of three and a half years in which he focused on biomedical optics. During this time, he invented tomographic phase microscopy which enables quantitative 3-D imaging of the refractive index of living cells and tissues of which a patent was later filed. He then implemented the first optical diffraction tomography of living cells which led to collaborative studies in biology and soft matter. These studies led to a new application area for digital holographic and interferometric microscopy.

In September 2009, Choi returned to South Korea to work in the Department of Physics of Korea University as an assistant professor. He became an associate professor in 2012 and a full professor in 2017. He is the principal investigator of the Super-depth Imaging Lab created in July 2016. The lab is within the IBS Center for Molecular Spectroscopy and Dynamics which falls under both the Institute for Basic Science and the Department of Physics in Korea University.

Choi's research interests include ultrahigh-resolution deep-tissue imaging, control of wave propagation within scattering media, ultra-thin endoscopic microscope, and far-field control of near-field waves. The research direction of his laboratory is to resolve tissue turbidity for super-depth optical imaging, light manipulation and phototherapy.

== Honors and awards ==
- 2023: Member, Korean Academy of Science and Technology
- 2020: Top 100 national R&D excellence achievements
- 2020: Award, Korean Optical Society
- 2019: Optica Fellow

== Journal editing ==
- 2017–present: Editorial board member, Scientific Reports
- 2013–2015: Executive editor, Journal of Optical Society of Korea
- 2010–2016: Associate editor, Biomedical Optics Express

== See also ==
- Cho Minhaeng
- Mathias Fink
