= Cho Minhaeng =

South Korean scientist (born 1965)

Cho Minhaeng (조민행)
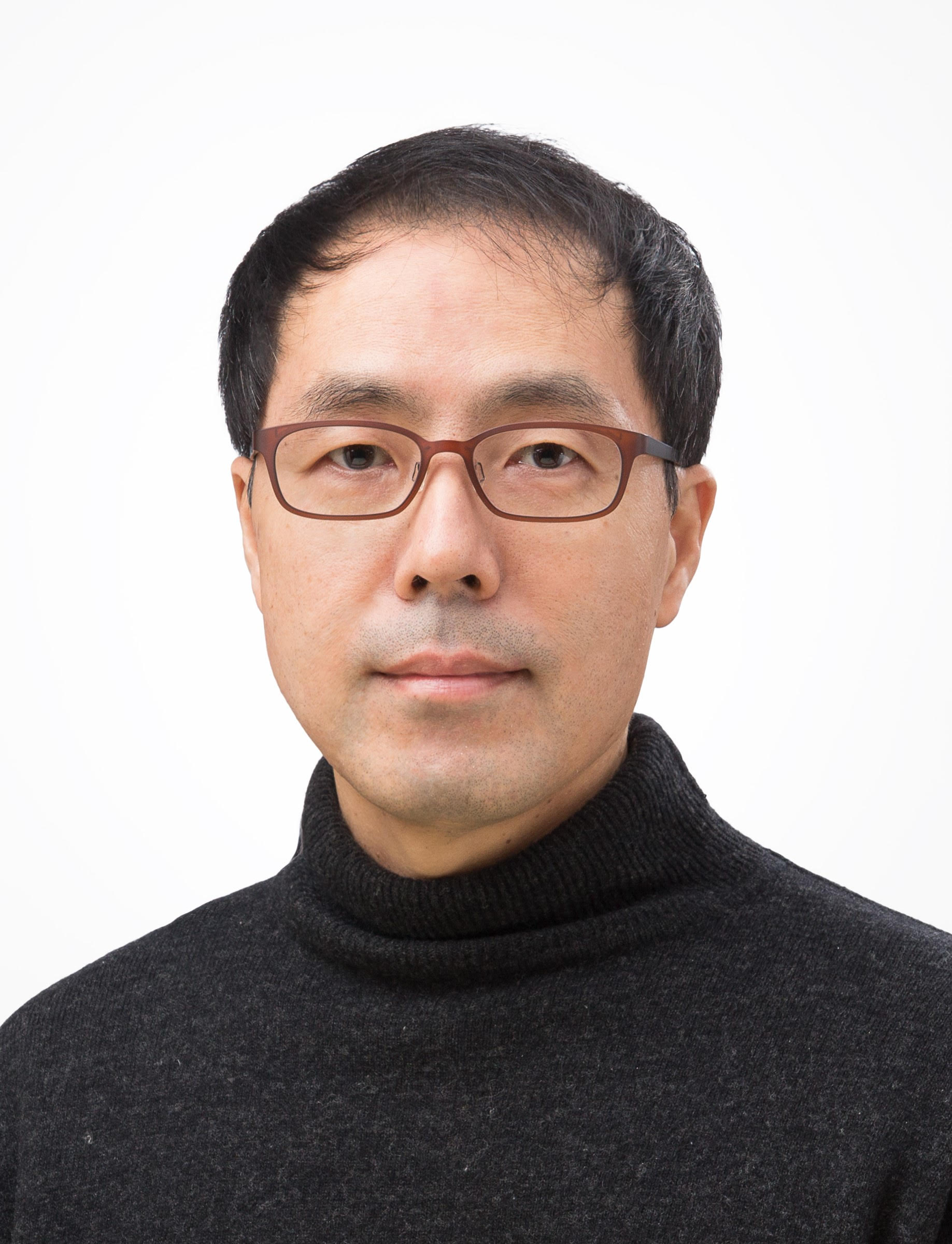
- Born: February 26, 1965; South Korea
- Awards: 2011 Korea Academy of Science and Technology; 2012 National Academy of Science; 2013 Seok-Top Lecturer, Korea University
- Scientific career
- Fields: Chemistry, spectroscopy
- Institutions: Institute for Basic Science, Korea University, MIT, University of Chicago
- Thesis: Ultrafast solvent dynamics and nonlinear spectroscopy (1993)
- Doctoral advisors: Graham Fleming
- Website: Center for Molecular Spectroscopy and Dynamics

- Cho Minhaeng
- Hangul: 조민행
- Hanja: 趙敏行
- RR: Jo Minhaeng
- MR: Cho Minhaeng

Cho Minhaeng (Korean: 조민행; born 1965) is a South Korean scientist in researching physical chemistry, spectroscopy, and microscopy. He was director of the National Creative Research Initiative Center for Coherent Multidimensional Spectroscopy and is founding director of the Center for Molecular Spectroscopy and Dynamics in the Institute for Basic Science (IBS), located in Korea University.

== Education ==
Majoring in chemistry, Cho Minhaeng (조민행) received both his B.S. and M.S. from Seoul National University in 1987 and 1989, respectively. He then studied in the University of Chicago where he majored in physical chemistry while at the same time was working there as a research assistant. Supervised by Professor Graham Fleming, he gained his Ph.D. in 1993.

== Career ==
During the first year of his Ph.D. studies, Cho was a visiting scientist at the University of Rochester for several months. He repeated this at the Institute for Molecular Science (IMS) in Japan in 1992 and at Brown University in 1993. He returned to IMS in 1993 as a visiting scientist and in 1997 as a visiting professor. After obtaining his Ph.D., Cho did a two-year postdoc under Professor Robert J. Silbey from 1994 to 1996 at MIT. He returned to Korea in 1996 as an assistant professor in the Department of Chemistry, College of Science at Korea University. He became an associate professor in 1999, a full professor in 2003, and from 2005 to 2008 was the Hyundai-Kia Motor Professor.

In 2002, Cho was the chairman of the 1st International Conference on Multidimensional Vibrational Spectroscopy, held at Korea University. He was a member of the International Cooperation Committee, Korea Chemical Society from 2003 to 2006. He directed the National Creative Research Initiative Center for Coherent Multidimensional Spectroscopy from 2000 to 2009. He became director of the IBS Center for Molecular Spectroscopy and Dynamics, established in December 2014. In 2016, Choi Wonshik joined the Center as an associate director and head of the Super-depth Imaging Lab.

Cho's research group studies nonlinear optical and vibrational spectroscopy, molecular dynamics simulations of chemical and biological systems in condensed phases, quantum dynamics of chemical reactions, linear and nonlinear chiroptical spectroscopy of biomolecules, quantum spectroscopy and imaging with high-precision laser technology, interferometric measurements of scattering fields for single particle tracking, chemically sensitive spectroscopy and imaging, surface-specific spectroscopy, and ultrafast vibrational microspectroscopy.

== Research ==
- Theory of Nonlinear Optical Spectroscopy: Nonlinear optical spectroscopy utilizing multiple (ultrashort) laser pulses has been extensively used in studying ultrafast chemical and biological processes in condensed phases. Cho theoretically studied nonlinear four-wave-mixing spectroscopy such as photon echo and coherent multidimensional spectroscopy over the past three decades. One of the old but still powerful spectroscopic techniques that allows one to directly measure solvation dynamics of either electronic or vibrational chromophores and homogeneous dephasing processes of those chromophores interacting with solvent molecules is the photon-echo peak-shift (PEPS) measurement method. The first theoretical description of the relationship between dynamic heterogeneity in optical transition frequencies of chromophores in condensed phases and the PEPS signal was described by Cho. The diagrammatic representation of nonlinear optical spectroscopy and complete theory of nonlinear optical and chiroptical spectroscopic phenomena have been thoroughly investigated and were presented in his book, Two-Dimensional Optical Spectroscopy (CRC press), published in 2009.
- Coherent Multidimensional Spectroscopy: After studying nonlinear four-wave-mixing spectroscopy, a natural extension of the photon echo-type spectroscopy that was a highly popular method to elucidate homogenous dephasing process without any contamination from inhomogeneous line-broadening contributions is coherent multidimensional spectroscopy with multiple laser pulses. Over the years, Cho has developed and completed the general theoretical framework of coherent multidimensional optical or vibrational spectroscopy and has applied it to a number of complex systems, including proteins and nucleic acids in aqueous solutions. In addition to the two-dimensional spectroscopic methods using either visible or IR pulses, in 1990's Cho theoretically proposed a new class of multidimensional spectroscopy that simultaneously uses both IR and visible pulses to investigate the couplings between electronic and vibrational modes (J. Chem. Phys. 109, 10559 (1998)). Only recently, over the last few years, such IR-vis four-wave-mixing-type two-dimensional spectroscopy has been experimentally demonstrated and proven to be of exceptional use in studying vibrational relaxation on excited state and vibronic mixings in electronically coupled multi-chromophore systems, including light-harvesting protein complexes and molecular aggregates.
- Chiroptical Spectroscopy: One of the most challenging experiments in the field of spectroscopy of chiral molecules is to develop an ultrafast time-domain chiroptical spectroscopy technique. In parallel, many attempts have been made to develop theoretical and computational methods for calculating nonlinear optical activity responses of chiral molecules by using either classical molecular dynamics simulation or hybrid quantum mechanical/molecular mechanical simulation method. Since a typical chiroptical signal is a few orders of magnitude smaller than linear spectroscopic observables such as absorption or light scattering cross-section, nonlinear spectroscopy using helical (left- or right-handed) light pulses is extraordinarily challenging due to their intrinsic weakness. Vibrational circular dichroism measurement with a commercially available spectrometer takes almost tens of minutes to hours. Therefore, it has long been desired to develop an ultrafast chiroptical spectroscopic technique. In 2003, Cho (J. Chem. Phys. 119, 7003-7016 (2003)) theoretically showed that two-dimensional chiroptical spectroscopy could provide critical information on molecular optical activity and its time-evolution. Later, Cho showed that a heterodyne-detection method with precise controls of pulse polarization states is of exceptional use in measuring femtosecond vibrational circular dichroism signals from chiral organic compounds in solutions. Furthermore, a super-continuum pulse generated by focusing an intense laser pulse into the water can be used to measure the heterodyne-detected chiroptical signal with unprecedented sensitivity. Even a single femtosecond laser pulse is enough to obtain a chiroptical spectrum in the visible frequency domain.
- Vibrational Solvatochromism. Theory and Experiment: The vibrational frequencies of polyatomic molecules shift in solutions or any other condensed phases due to intermolecular interactions between solute and solvent molecules. This has long been known as vibrational solvatochromism. Under the external field created by surrounding solvent molecules, the multidimensional potential energy surface of a polar polyatomic solute molecule is affected and changed, which results in vibrational frequency shifts and modulation of spectral lineshape. Over the past two decades, there has been a dramatic advancement in ultrafast vibrational spectroscopic techniques that are exceptionally useful for studying and monitoring ultrafast fluctuations of vibrational frequencies of IR probes incorporated into specific sites in a given protein. However, a lack of all-encompassing theory on vibrational solvatochromism and electrochromism has restricted experimentalists from quantitatively and accurately interpreting experimental findings. Since 2003, Cho has contributed to the theoretical development of vibrational solvatochromism (J. Chem. Phys. 118, 3480 (2003)). He showed that various intermolecular interactions such as Pauli exclusion repulsion, polarization, and dispersion contribute to the frequency shifts and fluctuations differently and often interfere with the contribution from Coulomb interaction. His theoretical descriptions and methods have been applied to a variety of complicated molecular and biological systems by a number of workers in the research field of time-resolved vibrational spectroscopy.
- Water in Crowded Environment, Percolation, and Graph-Theoretical Approach: Water plays a vital role in almost all biological phenomena. It is not just a solvent dissolved biomolecules in a cell but also a reactant of biochemical reactions and/or building blocks helping proteins and membranes to maintain their structures and functions. One of the widely acknowledged phenomena is the Hofmeister effect of ions on the stability of proteins in aqueous salt solutions. Cho and coworkers have used time-resolved IR spectroscopic methods and mathematical graph theory to investigate the impact of ions on water structure and dynamics and compared the experimental results with MD simulations. It has been found that ions in high salt solutions can form large aggregates, but their three-dimensional morphological structures could be quite different from one another (Ann. Rev. Phys. Chem. 69, 5.1-5.25 (2018)). Certain ions classified as chaotropic ions tend to form large ion networks that could be tightly intertwined with water H-bonding networks. On the other hand, the so-called kosmotropic ions prefer to form crystal-like aggregates at an early prenucleation stage. We have further investigated water structures and rovibrational dynamics in highly crowded solutions with polymers and osmolytes, which mimic a cytoplasmic environment. By using multiple IR probes, e.g., OD stretch of HDO, azido, and so on, the effects of crowder polymers and osmolytes on water structure have been elucidated. Surprisingly, there exists a large amount of water pool even at extremely high water-soluble polymer or osmolyte concentrations, which implies that the water in the cytoplasm behaves similar to bulk water. In fact, this finding is important because it suggests that there is no biological water (except for those water molecules on the surface of biopolymers in a cell) that is distinctively different from bulk water.
- Time-resolved IR spectroscopy and MD simulation studies of salt solutions and Li-ion battery: Solvation structure and dynamics in highly concentrated salt solutions are of fundamental importance in the physical chemistry of electrolytes. Recently, such salt-in-water and water-in-salt electrolytes have been paid a great deal of attention due to their potential applications to the next-generation lithium-ion battery beyond the organic carbonate-based electrolyte systems. We have used IR pump-probe, 2D-IR, and MD simulation methods to investigate the structures of solvation shells around Li-ions and their transport processes in such highly viscous solutions containing nearly saturated lithium salts.
- Interferometric Scattering Microscopy: An optical microscopy is an incisive tool for elucidating structures and functions of materials, including biological tissues and live cells. Over the past decades, we have witnessed dramatic technological advancements in optical microscopy and imaging based on fluorescence detection. By using structured illumination, it was experimentally demonstrated that super-resolution imaging of biological systems is feasible. However, such fluorescence-based imaging techniques suffer from photo-bleaching and -blinking problems, which significantly limit their broad applications to monitoring biological systems in real-time. Thus, a variety of label-free optical imaging techniques have been developed. Recently, a purely optical imaging technique based on precise and accurate measurement of scattering field with employing an interferometric detection scheme has been proven to be useful for obtaining even single protein dynamics. Cho and coworkers have recently improved its detection sensitivity by modulating polarization states of the incident and scattered fields, which enabled one to directly monitor the anisotropic nature and rotational motion of single gold nanorods in real-time. This technique was named psiSCAT, which is an abbreviation for Polarization Selective Interferometric Scattering microscopy. In addition, a remote-focusing (RF) approach was combined with psiSCAT, which is named remote-focusing interferometric scattering (RF-iSCAT) microscopy, to track a nanoparticle motion along the beam propagation direction. Then, this interferometric scattering microscopy was used to obtain optical images of substructures in live cells and organisms. Furthermore, its exceptional use in studying morphological aspects of cellular membrane structure and focal adhesion dynamics of living cells was demonstrated.
- Frequency-comb and Dual-laser Spectroscopy: Owing to rapid developments in laser technology and electronics, various ultrafast lasers in the broad frequency range from terahertz to x-ray have become readily available. They have accelerated vigorous developments of time-resolved vibrational/electronic spectroscopic techniques, which are valuable extensions of the more conventional pump-probe or, in general, excitation-detection-type spectroscopy. Unlike incoherent spectroscopy measuring population transfer and relaxation, coherent nonlinear spectroscopy requires precise control of optical phases of incident fields that are to be encoded into molecular superposition states via a sequence of coherent field-matter interactions. Recently, a new type of coherent nonlinear spectroscopy utilizing more than one mode-locked laser, the so-called frequency comb, whose repetition and carrier-envelop-offset frequencies are stabilized using a standard reference atomic clock frequency in the radio frequency domain, has been developed. Because time-delay scanning is achieved optically, not mechanically, e.g., translation stage, exceptionally rapid and accurate delay-time scanning becomes experimentally feasible. Cho and coworkers have demonstrated, for the first time, dual-frequency comb spectroscopy of optical chromophores in solutions, interferometric transient absorption, and dual-laser two-dimensional electronic spectroscopy of chromophores, including bacteriochlorophyll and light-harvesting complexes. These novel approaches would pave the way for future developments of all-optical-controlled multidimensional spectroscopy without moving parts.
- Wave-particle Duality, Quantum Optics, and Frequency-comb Single-photon Interferometry: One of the most counterintuitive concepts in quantum physics is the idea that quantum objects are complementary, behaving like waves in some situations and like particles in others. To establish a new and more quantitative foundation, Cho and coworkers (Sci. Adv. 7, eabi9268 (2021)) showed that precisely controlled dual photon sources could be used to measure a photon's degree of wave-ness and particle-ness. More specifically, the properties of the photon's source influence its wave and particle character, which is a discovery that complicates and challenges the common understanding of complementarity. Using the novel "entangled nonlinear bi-photon source (ENBS)" involving both a femtosecond frequency-comb laser and an exceptionally narrow (< 1 Hz) continuous-wave seed laser, they could establish a quantitative complementarity relation between wave and particle characters of single-photons. Furthermore, by constructing modified Mach-Zehnder interferometry with two ENBS', they additionally demonstrated the experimental feasibility of spectroscopy with quantum entangled photons.
- Label-free Vibrational Imaging. IR Photothermal Microscopy and Super-resolution Raman Imaging: Optical microscopy is an essential technique in biological and medical studies of live cells, tissues, and organisms. Using fluorescent molecules or proteins that can be site-specifically incorporated into organelles and biological molecules in a cell, one could achieve high-resolution localization and even super-resolution imaging beyond the diffraction limit. However, the intrinsic properties of fluorophores having photobleaching and photoblinking problems have severely limited their applications in the long-term tracking and monitoring of biological systems. As an alternative approach, label-free vibrational imaging techniques based on coherent anti-Stokes Raman scattering (CARS) and stimulated Raman scattering (SRS) have been developed and widely used in biomedical studies. Recently, Cho and coworkers experimentally demonstrated that super-resolution coherent Raman imaging could be possible by using a scheme with two competent SRS processes, which was theoretically proposed by Cho (JCP, 148, 014201 (2018). In principle, this approach is entirely different from the previous methods used to achieve super-resolution fluorescence microscopy. Yet, another label-free vibrational microscopic technique is IR-vis photothermal imaging (IPI), where an IR beam is used to excite vibrational molecules, and a visible beam is to probe the created transient photothermal lens. Cho and coworkers developed an IPI and used it to visualize the protein distribution in human neuronal cells and to track the change in protein concentrations over the entire course of cell division in real-time.

== Membership ==
- 2010: Member, Korean Academy of Science and Technology
- 2002–2009: Junior Member, Korean Academy of Science and Technology
- 1996–present: Permanent Member, Korean Chemical Society
- 1996–present: Member, American Chemical Society

== Journal Editorial Board Member ==
- 2019–present: Editorial Advisory Board, Applied Sciences
- 2019–present: Editorial Advisory Board, The Journal of Physical Chemistry A
- 2016–present: Editorial Advisory Board, Spectrochimica Acta Part A
- 2016–present: Editorial Advisory Board, Biomedical Spectroscopy and Imaging
- 2015–2017: Editorial Advisory Board: The Journal of Chemical Physics
- 2013–present: Editorial Advisory Board, Chirality
- 2010–2011: Academic Editor, AIP Advances
- 2007–present: Editorial Advisory Board, Chemical Physics
- 2000–2003: Editorial Advisory Board, PhysChemComm

== Honors and awards ==
- 2023: Academic Excellence Award, Korean Chemical Society
- 2022: Nobel Symposium (NS 173), Royal Swedish Academy of Sciences, Sweden
- 2022: Guthikonda Lecturer (Columbia University, USA)
- 2021: Toray Korea Science Prize (한국도레이 과학상), Toray-Korea
- 2019: Seok-Top Lecturer, Korea University
- 2018: Seok-Top Lecturer, Korea University
- 2017: Seok-Top Lecturer, Korea University
- 2017: Physical Chemistry Award, Korean Chemical Society
- 2013: Seok-Top Lecturer, Korea University
- 2012: Seok-Top Lecturer, Korea University
- 2012: National Academy of Science Award
- 2012: 100 Who Will Shine on Korea in 10 Years, Dong-A Ilbo
- 2011: Korean Academy of Science and Technology Award
- 2010: 100 Representatives of Excellence, Korea Research Foundation
- 2010: Kyung-Ahm Prize, Kyung-Ahm Foundation
- 2009: Scientist of the Month, National Research Foundation of Korea
- 2009: Seok-Top Lecturer, Korea University
- 2005: 50 Representatives of Excellence, Korea Research Foundation
- 2000: Young Scholar Award, Pacifichem, American Chemical Society
- 2000: Shonan Lecturer The Graduate University for Advanced Studies, Hayama, Japan
- 1999: British Chevening Award, British Council, Seoul, Korea
- 1999: Young Scientist Award, Korean Academy of Science and Technology
- 1995: Nobel Laureate Signature Award, American Chemical Society
- 1994: Marc P. Galler Prize, University of Chicago
- 1992: William R. Harper Fellowship, University of Chicago
- 1989–1992: Korean Government Scholarship, Korean Ministry of Education
