= Sandra Rosenthal =

Sandra Rosenthal may refer to:

- Sandra B. Rosenthal (born 1936), American philosopher
- Sandra J. Rosenthal (born 1966), professor of chemistry
