= Jennifer Ogilvie =

Canadian physicist

Jennifer Pauline Ogilvie
- Born: Canada
- Education: University of Toronto; Simon Fraser University; University of Waterloo
- Scientific career
- Workplaces: University of Michigan
- Thesis: Spectroscopic investigations of heme proteins (2004)

Jennifer Pauline Ogilvie is a Canadian physicist and Professor of Physics, Biophysics, and Macromolecular Science and Engineering at the University of Michigan. She develops multidimensional spectroscopic and microscopy-based methods to exploit the interactions between ultrafast (~10^{−15} s) pulses and matter. She is interested in the ultrafast energy transport and conversion processes in light-harvesting systems.

== Early life and education ==
Ogilvie is from Canada. She was an undergraduate student at the University of Waterloo, and moved to Simon Fraser University for her graduate research. Her doctoral research at the University of Toronto involved spectroscopic investigations into hemoprotein. She developed ultrafast pump-probe spectroscopy to understand the dynamics of photodissociation. She demonstrated that when the carbon monoxide ligand breaks from myoglobin it establishes coherent oscillations that initiate motions along the protein function pathway. She developed phase-grating spectroscopy to study ligand escape from the myoglobin.

== Research and career ==
Ogilive develops ultrafast spectroscopic and microscopic methods to better understand biological processes across a range of length scales. The processes that take place during photosynthesis occur on ultrafast timescales with high quantum efficiencies. Ogilive believes that by elucidating the design rules of systems involved in photosynthesis it will be possible to create more efficient artificial light harvesting systems. She has explored organic synthesis as a strategy to design new molecular systems for quantum information science.

== Select publications ==
- Gregory D Scholes; Graham R Fleming; Lin X Chen; et al. (1 March 2017). "Using coherence to enhance function in chemical and biophysical systems". Nature. 543 (7647): 647–656. Bibcode:2017Natur.543..647S. doi:10.1038/nature21425. ISSN 1476-4687. PMID 28358065. Wikidata Q46297641.
- Franklin D Fuller; Jie Pan; Andrius Gelzinis; et al. (13 July 2014). "Vibronic coherence in oxygenic photosynthesis". Nature Chemistry. 6 (8): 706–711. doi:10.1038/nchem.2005. ISSN 1755-4330. PMID 25054941. Wikidata Q48286974.
- Jianshu Cao; Richard J Cogdell; David F Coker; et al. (3 April 2020). "Quantum biology revisited". Science Advances. 6 (14) eaaz4888. doi:10.1126/sciadv.aaz4888. ISSN 2375-2548. PMC 7124948. PMID 32284982. Wikidata Q91878515.
