= Rebecca Richards-Kortum =

American bioengineer

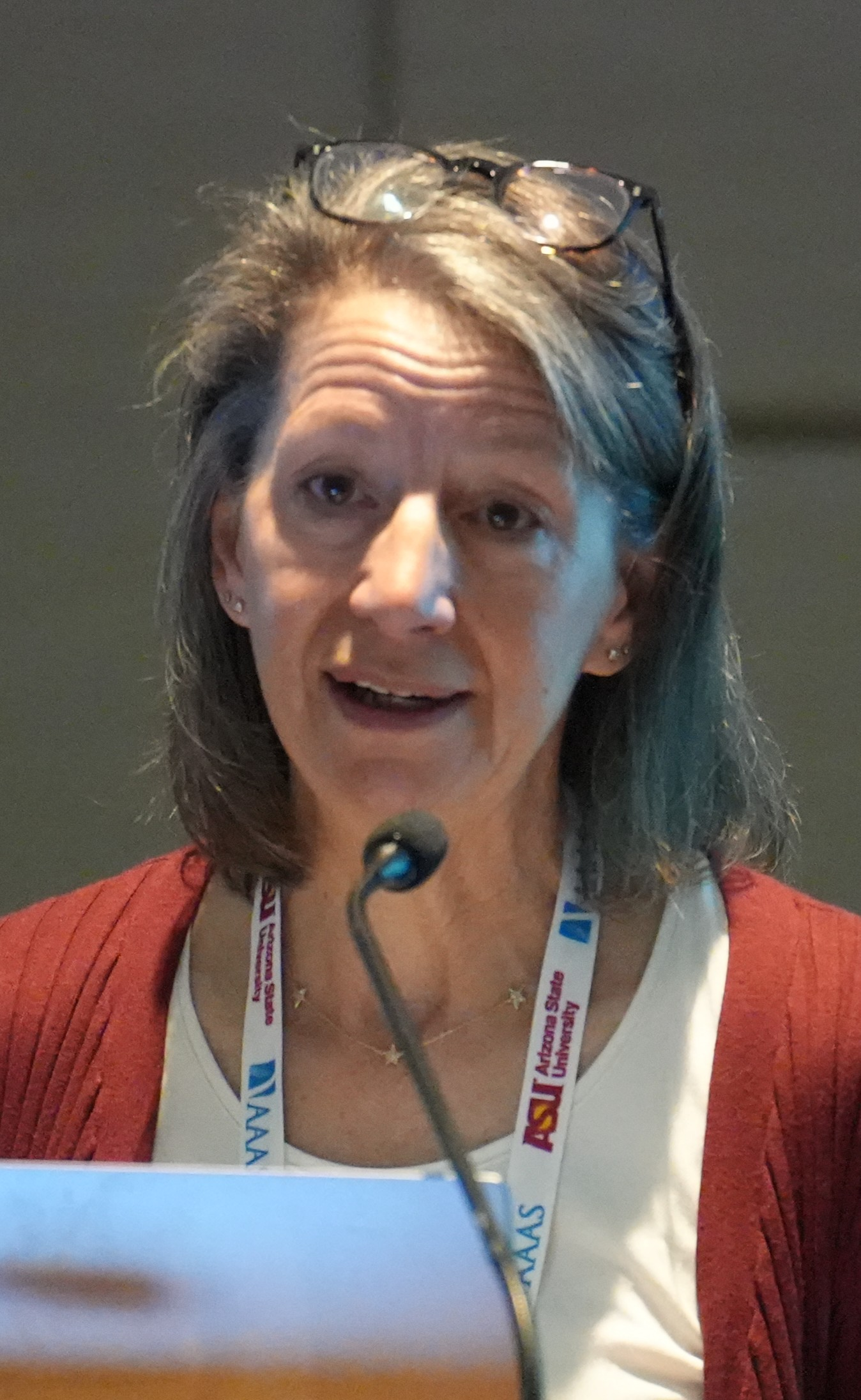
- Richards-Kortum in 2026
- Born: April 14, 1964 (age 62); Grand Island, Nebraska
- Education: University of Nebraska–Lincoln (BS); Massachusetts Institute of Technology (MS); Massachusetts Institute of Technology (PhD)
- Awards: 1999: Y.C. Fung Young Investigator Award, American Society of Mechanical Engineers, 1991: Presidential Young Investigator, National Science Foundation, 1992: Presidential Faculty Fellow, National Science Foundation, 1992: Becton Dickinson Career Achievement Award, Association for the Advancement of Medical Instrumentation, 2004: Sharon Keillor Award for Women in Engineering Education, American Society for Engineering Education, 2007: Chester F. Carlson Award, American Society for Engineering Education, 2008: Vice President Recognition Award, Institute of Electrical and Electronics Engineers (IEEE), 2010: Pritzker Distinguished Scientist and Lecturer, Biomedical Engineering Society (BMES), 2011: Celebrating Women in Science Award, BioHouston, Inc., 2012: Women Leaders in Medicine Award, American Medical Student Association, 2016: Pierre Galletti Award,American Institute for Medical and Biological Engineering (AIMBE), 2014: Michael S. Feld Biophotonics Award, Optical Society of America, 2014, 2016: George R. Brown Award for Superior Teaching, Rice University, 2018: U.S. Science Envoy, U.S. State Department, 2018: Finalist, MacArthur Foundation 100&Change Competition; 2019: National Inventors Hall of Fame
- Scientific career
- Fields: Bioengineering
- Workplaces: Rice University
- Doctoral advisor: Michael Stephen Feld
- Notable students: Nimmi Ramanujam; Anita Mahadevan-Jansen

Rebecca Rae Richards-Kortum (born April 14, 1964) is an American bioengineer and the Malcolm Gillis University Professor at Rice University. She is a professor in the departments of Bioengineering and Electrical and Computer Engineering, and she is the Director of Rice 360°: Institute for Global Health, and the Founder of Beyond Traditional Borders. She is the Director of the Institute of Biosciences and Bioengineering, and serves as the advisor to the Provost on health-related research.

Richards-Kortum is the recipient of the Pierre Galletti Award, the highest honor from the American Institute for Medical and Biological Engineering (AIMBE), for her contributions to global health care and bioengineering technology.

== Early life ==
Richards-Kortum grew up in Grand Island, Nebraska. She enjoyed math and science in elementary school and attended the University of Nebraska–Lincoln after high school. Due to a dearth of women mentors and role models, she initially aspired to be a high school math and science teacher upon her graduation. Her trajectory changed after graduating with highest distinction in physics and mathematics, when she considered PhD programs after being exposed to undergraduate research. She attended Massachusetts Institute of Technology and received a master's degree in physics in 1987 and a doctorate in medical physics in 1990.

== Career and research ==
Richards-Kortum began her academic career at The University of Texas at Austin in the electrical and computer engineering department, where she rose through the ranks from assistant, to associate, to full professor. She then joined the faculty of bioengineering at Rice University, earning the rank of University Professor, which means she can teach in any academic department and across disciplines.

Richards-Kortum specializes in creating new technologies to provide health care to vulnerable populations, including methods for diagnosis of cancers, methods for treating jaundice in newborns, and a bubble continuous positive airway pressure machine for premature infants unable to breathe on their own.

After learning that many people lacked access in early screening options for cancer, she developed a low-cost battery imaging system that could detect premalignant tissues without a biopsy. This innovation was further expanded to detect oral cancer, cervical cancer, and reduce biopsies for about 90 percent of patients with benign esophageal cancer lesions. Her laboratory works to advance nanotechnology and molecular imaging in order to develop portable and inexpensive optical imaging systems. It can monitor a patient's response to therapy as well as evaluate the boundaries of the tumor.

In 2005, she noticed the lack of resources in terms of equipment and infrastructure for premature babies in impoverished areas. With another faculty member at Rice University, she created the Rice 360° Institute for Global Health where she developed low-power devices at a low cost. The institute has created a myriad of solutions ranging from Pumani CPAP system which works to help newborns who have breathing problems, BiliSpec, a diagnostic tool for jaundice that measures bilirubin levels, and DoseRight, a solution for precise administration of liquid medication to children.

In addition, she co-founded Beyond Traditional Borders, which is a curriculum for undergraduates to turn classroom content into solutions for global health. Through the course, students are tasked with building a technology that responds to a global health need as a part of a capstone project. Through this class, she has worked with students to create an LED based phototherapy lights and positive airway pressure machines.

== Publications ==
She is the author of the textbook Biomedical Engineering for Global Health (Cambridge University Press, 2010) and the author or co-author of over 315 research papers, 13 book chapters, and 40 patents.

== Honors and awards ==
In 2018, Richards-Kortum was selected as one of five US scientists to serve in the US Department of State as a US Science Envoy for Health Security. Through this position, she will focus on expanding American engineering research to Africa to build more capacity for collaborations.

She is also the 2017 finalist of the MacArthur Foundation grant where she received millions of dollars for her team to develop and implement their neonatal technology that is estimated to prevent over 85 percent of newborn deaths in Africa.

In recognition of her work, Richards-Kortum received a MacArthur Fellowship in 2016. She was elected to the National Academy of Engineering in 2008 and the National Academy of Sciences and the American Academy of Arts and Sciences in 2015.

In 2016 she received the Pierre Galletti Award, the highest honor from the American Institute for Medical and Biological Engineering (AIMBE), for her contributions to global health care and bioengineering technology. In her Pierre Galletti address to the AIMBE, she noted that the biggest career-transition gender disparity occurs at the graduate student/postdoc-to-assistant professor step, and she challenged the leaders in bioengineering to encourage women to pursue academic positions, especially at the "20th mile" of the academic "marathon."

She was elected to the American Philosophical Society in 2017.

In 2014 Richards-Kortum was awarded the Michael S. Feld Biophotonics Award from The Optical Society for her "exceptional contributions to advancing the applications of optics in disease diagnosis and inspiring work in disseminating low-cost health technologies to the developing world."

In 2008, she was named a Howard Hughes Medical Institute Professor and received a grant for the undergraduate global health program at Rice. This program won the science prize for Inquiry-Based Instruction from Science magazine and the Lemelson-MIT Award Global Innovation.

She was also listed on Fortune magazine's list of 50 World's Greatest Leaders.
