= Marta Dark McNeese =

American physicist

- Education: University of Virginia; Massachusetts Institute of Technology
- Scientific career
- Workplaces: Spelman College
- Thesis: The physical response of soft musculoskeletal tissues to short pulsed laser irradiation (1999)
- Doctoral advisor: Michael Stephen Feld
- Other academic advisors: Bascom S. Deaver; Lou Bloomfield

Marta Dark McNeese is an American physicist and professor at Spelman College. She was the first African American woman to receive a bachelor's degree in physics from the University of Virginia. Her research focuses on laser interactions with biological tissues and electro-optical effects in biomolecules, and has applications in light-emitting devices, diodes for displays, and flexible light-emitting materials.

== Early life and education ==
McNeese grew up in Prince George's County, Maryland. She attended Eleanor Roosevelt High School in Greenbelt, Maryland. Her high school had a focus on science and math programming.

She attended the University of Virginia in Charlottesville, Virginia, for her undergraduate studies. There, she started in the College of Engineering, but switched to the College of Arts and Sciences in her first year. She majored in physics and minored in astrophysics and studied with Bascom S. Deaver and Lou Bloomfield, graduating in 1992. She was a volunteer DJ at the University of Virginia while she was a student. During her undergraduate studies, she completed an undergraduate research experience at Lehigh University and interned at IBM for a summer.

McNeese went on to attended the Massachusetts Institute of Technology for her doctoral studies. Her thesis was titled "The physical response of soft musculoskeletal tissues to short pulsed laser irradiation," and her doctoral advisor was Michael Stephen Feld. At MIT, she was part of the Spectroscopy Lab, worked in the Laser Biomedical Research Center, and was a teacher's assistant for an introductory physics course.

== Career ==
After completing her PhD, McNeese stayed on at MIT as a postdoc for two months before accepting a postdoctoral position at the United States Naval Research Laboratory in Washington, D.C. After about a year at the Naval Research Laboratory, McNeese was hired as a faculty member at Spelman College in Atlanta, Georgia, in 2000.

At this point, Spelman's physics program was in its early stages, and at the time of McNeese's hiring, the department grew from three to five faculty members. The effort to establish a physics program at Spelman was led by Etta Zuber Falconer at the time. McNeese specifically helped develop a biophysics course at the college at the beginning of her tenure.

She is a member of numerous professional groups, including Optica and the American Association of Physics Teachers, and also serves on the latter's committee on diversity, committee on women, and editorial board for The Physics Teachers. She is a member of the American Physical Society and has served on the group's Committee on Minorities, Panel on Public Affairs, and is currently a General Councilor. As a member of the National Society of Black Physicists, she has co-chaired the group's Chemical and Biological Physics section.

McNeese is currently associate professor of physics and Chair of the physics department at Spelman College.
