= Michael Stephen Feld =

American physicist

Michael S. Feld
- Born: November 11, 1940
- Died: April 10, 2010 (aged 69); Jamaica Plain, Massachusetts, USA
- Citizenship: United States
- Known for: Quantum optics, single atom laser, biomedical optics
- Scientific career
- Fields: Physicist
- Institutions: Massachusetts Institute of Technology in Cambridge, MA
- Doctoral advisor: Ali Javan
- Notable students: Choi Wonshik; Rebecca Richards-Kortum; Ronald McNair; Gabriel Popescu; Marta Dark McNeese; Vadim Backman

Michael S. Feld (November 11, 1940 – April 10, 2010) was an American physicist, who was best known for his work on quantum optics, and medical applications of lasers.

== Biography ==
Michael S. Feld received his Ph.D. from the Massachusetts Institute of Technology under the supervision of laser pioneer Ali Javan. He remained at MIT throughout his career, where he was a faculty member from 1968 until his death. He was the director of the George R. Harrison Spectroscopy Laboratory at MIT.

Feld was well known in the field of quantum optics for his first observation of optical superradiance. He is credited for the experimental demonstrations of cavity, cavity-suppressed spontaneous emission, and the experimental demonstration of the first single-atom laser. In the later part of his career, he turned his attention to the field of biomedical optics, where he developed methods for in-tissue spectroscopy and imaging. Feld also directed the Laser Biomedical Research Center at MIT, where he worked on fluorescence and Raman spectroscopy to measure in-vivo levels of biomarker molecules that assisted in the imaging of disease-causing microorganisms via endoscopy and optical tomography.

Feld strongly valued a scientific environment without ethnic or cultural prejudice, and many of his co-workers and Ph.D. students were from minority groups. Notably, he was the Ph.D. advisor of astronaut Ronald McNair, who died in the Challenger disaster.

== Honors and awards ==
- Fellow, The Optical Society
- 2008 William F. Meggers Award in Spectroscopy

== Bibliography ==
- "In Memory, Michael S. Feld". Optics & Photonics News. 21 (7): 66. 2010.
- MIT News: "Michael S. Feld, physics professor, dies at age 69"
- K. An.; J. J. Childs; R. R. Dasari & M. S. Feld (1994). "Microlaser - A Laser with One-Atom in an Optical-Resonator". Physical Review Letters. 73 (25): 3375–3378. Bibcode:1994PhRvL..73.3375A. doi:10.1103/physrevlett.73.3375. PMID 10057365.
- N. Skribanowitz; I. P. Herman; J. C. MacGillivray & M. S. Feld (1973). "Observation of Dicke Superradiance in Optically Pumped HF Gas". Physical Review Letters. 30 (8): 309–312. Bibcode:1973PhRvL..30..309S. doi:10.1103/PhysRevLett.30.309.
- C. H. Holbrow (2011). "Remembering Michael Stephen Feld: Physics and Biomedicine Pioneer (1940–2010)". J. Biomed. Opt. 16 (1): 011002–011002–4. Bibcode:2011JBO....16a1002H. doi:10.1117/1.3535591. hdl:1721.1/65190. PMID 21280889.
- R. R. Dasari; D. Kleppner & C. H. Holbrow (2010). "Obituaries: Michael Stephen Feld". Physics Today. Vol. 61, no. 11. p. 60. doi:10.1063/1.3518219.

== Notes ==
In 2012, the Optical Society established the Michael S. Feld Biophotonics Award which recognizes individuals for their innovative and influential contributions to the field of biophotonics; regardless of their career stage. The award was first presented in 2013 to Brian C. Wilson. A list of recipients can be found online at https://www.osa.org/en-us/awards_and_grants/awards/award_description/michaelsfeld/
