= Anita Mahadevan-Jansen =

Biomedical engineer

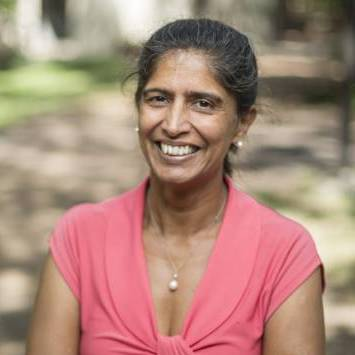
- Mahadevan-Jansen in 2019
- Born: 1967 (age 58–59)
- Education: University of Mumbai (BSc, MS); University of Texas at Austin (MS, PhD)
- Known for: Clinical Biophotonics; Surgical Guidance; Cancer Detection; Raman Spectroscopy; Fluorescence Spectroscopy; Neuromodulation
- Awards: Fellow of SPIE; Fellow of the Optical Society; Fellow of the Society for Applied Spectroscopy; Fellow of the American Society for Laser Medicine and Surgery; Fellow of the American Institute for Medical and Biological Engineering
- Scientific career
- Fields: Biomedical Engineering; Physics; Optics; Biophotonics
- Workplaces: Vanderbilt University
- Doctoral advisor: Rebecca Richards-Kortum
- Website: www.vanderbilt.edu/vbc

Anita Mahadevan-Jansen (born 1967) is a professor of Biomedical Engineering and holds the Orrin H. Ingram Chair in Biomedical Engineering at Vanderbilt University. Her research considers the development of optical techniques for clinical diagnosis and surgical guidance, particularly using Raman and fluorescence spectroscopy. She serves on the Board of Directors of SPIE, and is a Fellow of SPIE, The Optical Society, Society for Applied Spectroscopy, and the American Society for Laser Medicine and Surgery. She was elected to serve as the 2020 Vice President of SPIE. With her election, Mahadevan-Jansen joined the SPIE presidential chain and served as President-Elect in 2021 and the Society's president in 2022.

== Early life and education ==
As a child Mahadevan-Jansen wanted to be a medical doctor. She studied physics at the University of Mumbai, and earned her Bachelor's and master's degree there in 1990. As an undergraduate student she was disinterested in optics. Her professor, S.B. Patel, proposed that she applied to work in biomedical engineering. She moved to the University of Texas at Austin for her doctoral studies, where she completed a Master's and PhD in 1996. There, she began working with fluorescence spectroscopy under the supervision of Rebecca Richards-Kortum.

== Research and career ==
Mahadevan-Jansen joined the faculty at Vanderbilt University in 1996 and is currently Orrin H. Ingram Professor of Biomedical Engineering, Professor of Neurological Surgery. She founded the Vanderbilt Biophotonics Center, where she works on optical diagnostics, surgical guidance, and neurophotonics. She is interested in translating optical technologies into in vivo diagnostic tools. Mahadevan-Jansen pioneered the use of in vivo Raman spectroscopy for non-invasive diagnostics cervical dysplasia. Her methodology is being developed for use in clinical medicine, for example, it may be used by surgeons in the treatment of breast and brain cancer. She created optical blood testing methodologies for neonatal babies, which was selected by the Vanderbilt University Center for Technology Transfer as one of the "coolest inventions" of the year. She developed sensors that can detect inflammation caused by bowel disease into a typical colonoscopy procedure.

In 2005, Dr. Mahadevan-Jansen and collaborators (including her husband, Dr. E Duco Jansen) discovered the ability to control peripheral and central nervous system electrical activity label-free with short pulses of infrared light. Termed infrared neural stimulation (INS), the field of label-free neuromodulation has evolved over the last decade built on these initial findings. This technology has demonstrated as safe and clinically translatable in humans.

In 2014, Mahadevan-Jansen was elected as conference co-chair to the 2018 Gordon Research Conference on Lasers in Medicine Biology with Paul French. She is exploring the use of Raman spectroscopy for investigating pre-term cervical remodeling. In 2018, 10 years after Mahadevan-Jensen demonstrated that parathyroid gland tissues glow under near-infrared light, the Food and Drug Administration approved that the technology could be used for surgeries. Her technology, the PTeye, was tested in an 81 patient clinical trial, and enables in situ monitoring of the parathyroid tissue during thyroid surgery. Before Mahadevan-Jansen's technology, surgeons relied on a visual assessment to identify the location of the parathyroid gland. In 2019 she took a sabbatical at the University of Adelaide, Australia. She is also working on a development of Raman spectroscopy for the early diagnosis of throat cancer related to HPV. She leads a $3 million Vanderbilt University program that develops microscopy tools. Both projects are part of the Trans-Institutional Programs (TIPs) program at Vanderbilt University.

Since 1995, Mahadevan-Jansen is listed as co-inventor on more than 20 USPTO patents, several of which being licensed towards commercial development.

=== Academic service ===
Dr. Mahadevan-Jansen has served as a reviewer for nearly two dozen journals over her career, including her role on the editorial board for the Journal of Biomedical Optics from 2007 to 2014. She started the Biomedical Vibrational Spectroscopy conference at SPIE's Photonics West BiOS conference in 2002, which has been running ever since. In 2007 she featured in the SPIE Women in Optics planner. Her advocacy for improving diversity and inclusion in optics and photonics has led to her chairing the SPIE Equity, Diversity, and Inclusion Committee. She is a Fellow of SPIE and served on the Board of Directors from 2014 to 2019. In 2014 Mahadaevan-Jansen was the second woman to be elected Chair of the Gordon Research Conference on Lasers in Medicine & Biology. She also serves as a Fellow of The Optical Society and the American Institute for Medical and Biological Engineering. She and her students have received numerous awards for research excellence and mentoring, for which she remains a strong advocate.

=== Selected publications ===
Her publications include;

- Mahadevan-Jansen, Anita (2019). "Raman microspectroscopy differentiates perinatal pathogens on ex vivo infected human fetal membrane tissues". Journal of Biophotonics. e201800449 (9) e201800449. doi:10.1002/jbio.201800449. PMC 6902120. PMID 31162821.
- Mahadevan-Jansen, Anita (2019). "Enhancing Parathyroid Gland Visualization Using a Near Infrared Fluorescence-Based Overlay Imaging System". Journal of the American College of Surgeons. 228 (5): 730–743. doi:10.1016/j.jamcollsurg.2019.01.017. PMC 6487208. PMID 30769112.
- Mahadevan-Jansen, Anita (2018). "Development of a visually guided Raman spectroscopy probe for cervical assessment during pregnancy". Journal of Biophotonics. 12 (2) e201800138. doi:10.1002/jbio.201800138. PMC 6578580. PMID 30259692.

== Personal life ==
Mahadevan-Jansen is married to Duco Jansen, a professor of Biomedical Engineering at Vanderbilt University. Together they have two children.
