= Prundu =

- Commune
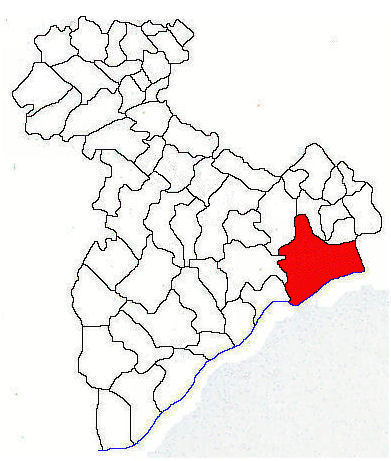
- Location in Giurgiu County

- Location in Romania
- Coordinates: 44°05′41″N 26°13′37″E
- Country: Romania
- County: Giurgiu

Government
  - Mayor (2024–2028): Gigi Cristescu (PNL)
- Area: 176.51 km^{2} (68.15 sq mi)
- Elevation: 66 m (217 ft)
- Population (2021-12-01): 3,707
  - Density: 21.00/km^{2} (54.39/sq mi)
- Time zone: UTC+02:00 (EET)
  - Summer (DST): UTC+03:00 (EEST)
- Postal code: 087180
- Area code: +(40) 246
- Vehicle reg.: GR
- Website: primariaprundu.ro

Prundu is a commune located in Giurgiu County, Muntenia, Romania. It is composed of two villages, Prundu and Puieni.

Some 300 m (980 ft) from the Danube, there was also a hamlet called Flămânda, inhabited by some 30 Boyash and 5-6 Romanian families. The hamlet has been depopulated since 1962, when the Danube swallowed it up and the inhabitants moved to Prundu village.

There was an ancient Roman fort at Flămânda located on the Limes Transalutanus frontier of Dacia.

The hamlet was the starting point of the Flămânda Offensive by the Romanian Army against the Central Powers in World War I.

Historical population
Year	Pop.	±%
2002	4,785	—
2011	4,386	−8.3%
2021	3,707	−15.5%
Source: Census data
