= Graham Fleming =

American chemist

Graham R. Fleming
- Born: 1949 (age 76–77); Barrow, England
- Education: University of Bristol; University College London; California Institute of Technology; University of Melbourne; Royal Institution
- Scientific career
- Fields: Physical chemistry; Spectroscopy; Quantum biology
- Workplaces: University of Chicago; University of California, Berkeley; Lawrence Berkeley National Laboratory
- Doctoral advisor: George Porter
- Other academic advisors: George Wilse Robinson
- Doctoral students: Sandra J. Rosenthal; Cho Minhaeng

Graham R. Fleming is a professor of chemistry at the University of California, Berkeley and member of the Kavli Energy NanoScience Institute based at UCB.

Fleming's team is known for developing and using techniques in advanced multidimensional, ultrafast spectroscopy to study complex condensed phase dynamics in systems including natural photosynthetic complexes and nanoscale systems including single-walled carbon nanotubes and organic photovoltaic systems.

These investigations and the findings of Fleming's team have indicated the key role of quantum electronic coherence in disordered biological environments. These findings have pointed towards the importance of examining the role of quantum dynamical processes in biological energy harvesting systems.

== Education, career, and service ==
Fleming was born 3 December 1949 in Barrow (now Barrow-in-Furness), England, and received his B.S. degree with honors in chemistry from the University of Bristol in 1971. He subsequently received his Ph.D. in physical chemistry from the University College London and the Royal Institution in 1974. Fleming then held postdoctoral researcher appointments at three institutions: California Institute of Technology (1974–1975); University of Melbourne (1975–1976); and the Royal Institution (1976–1979).

In 1979, Fleming began his independent research team with a faculty appointment at the University of Chicago. He was promoted to associate professor at the University of Chicago in 1983 and in 1985 was made a full professor. In 1987, Fleming was named the Arthur Holly Compton Distinguished Services Professor a position which he held for ten years. At the University of Chicago, Fleming served for three years as the chair of the chemistry department. During his time at the University of Chicago, he worked with John Keith Moffat to found the university's first new research institute in 50 years, the Institute for Biophysical Dynamics.

Fleming transitioned his research team to the University of California, Berkeley in 1997 where he held joint appointments as professor in chemistry and the founding director of the physical biosciences division at Lawrence Berkeley National Laboratory. In 2002, Fleming received an appointment as the Melvin Calvin Distinguished Professor of Chemistry at UCB. Fleming was also founding director of the California Institute for Quantitative Biosciences (QB3) based at UC Berkeley.

In the areas of service to the university, Fleming also served as the vice-chancellor for research at UCB from April 2009 to 2015.

== Harassment allegations ==
Fleming resigned from his position as vice chancellor for research (2015) and was subsequently removed as a Berkeley Global Campus ambassador (2016) following the filing of a harassment complaint against him by a former employee in 2014. The investigation that followed determined Fleming had violated the University of California's sexual harassment policy.

== Select publications ==
Fleming has an extensive publication record. Listed below are some select publications from his independent research career at UC Berkeley:

- Fleming, Graham R.; Niyogi, Krishna K.; Li, Xiao-Ping; Valkunas, Leonas; Zigmantas, Donatas; Holt, Nancy E. (21 January 2005). "Carotenoid Cation Formation and the Regulation of Photosynthetic Light Harvesting". Science. 307 (5708): 433–436. Bibcode:2005Sci...307..433H. doi:10.1126/science.1105833. ISSN 0036-8075. PMID 15662017. S2CID 18943254.
- Fleming, Graham R.; Blankenship, Robert E.; Minhaeng Cho; Vaswani, Harsha M.; Stenger, Jens; Brixner, Tobias (2005). "Two-dimensional spectroscopy of electronic couplings in photosynthesis". Nature. 434 (7033): 625–628. Bibcode:2005Natur.434..625B. doi:10.1038/nature03429. ISSN 1476-4687. PMID 15800619. S2CID 4416309.
- Fleming, Graham R.; Blankenship, Robert E.; Cheng, Yuan-Chung; Tomáš Mančal; Ahn, Tae-Kyu; Read, Elizabeth L.; Calhoun, Tessa R.; Engel, Gregory S. (2007). "Evidence for wavelike energy transfer through quantum coherence in photosynthetic systems" (PDF). Nature. 446 (7137): 782–786. Bibcode:2007Natur.446..782E. doi:10.1038/nature05678. ISSN 1476-4687. PMID 17429397. S2CID 13865546.
- Fleming, Graham R.; Cheng, Yuan-Chung; Lee, Hohjai (8 June 2007). "Coherence Dynamics in Photosynthesis: Protein Protection of Excitonic Coherence" (PDF). Science. 316 (5830): 1462–1465. Bibcode:2007Sci...316.1462L. doi:10.1126/science.1142188. ISSN 0036-8075. PMID 17556580.
- Fleming, Graham R.; Bassi, Roberto; Niyogi, Krishna K.; Cheng, Yuan-Chung; Ballottari, Matteo; Avenson, Thomas J.; Ahn, Tae Kyu (9 May 2008). "Architecture of a Charge-Transfer State Regulating Light Harvesting in a Plant Antenna Protein" (PDF). Science. 320 (5877): 794–797. Bibcode:2008Sci...320..794A. doi:10.1126/science.1154800. ISSN 0036-8075. PMID 18467588. S2CID 17495907.
- Fleming, Graham R.; Scholes, Gregory D.; Hsu, Chao-Ping; Linden, Patricia A.; Walla, Peter J. (26 September 2000). "Femtosecond dynamics of the forbidden carotenoid S1 state in light-harvesting complexes of purple bacteria observed after two-photon excitation". Proceedings of the National Academy of Sciences. 97 (20): 10808–10813. Bibcode:2000PNAS...9710808W. doi:10.1073/pnas.190230097. ISSN 0027-8424. PMC 27105. PMID 10984512.
- Grondelle, Rienk van; Niederman, Robert A.; Fleming, Graham R.; Cogdell, Richard J.; Stokkum, Ivo H. M. van; Papagiannakis, Emmanouil; Kennis, John T. M.; Gradinaru, Claudiu C. (27 February 2001). "An unusual pathway of excitation energy deactivation in carotenoids: Singlet-to-triplet conversion on an ultrafast timescale in a photosynthetic antenna". Proceedings of the National Academy of Sciences. 98 (5): 2364–2369. Bibcode:2001PNAS...98.2364G. doi:10.1073/pnas.051501298. ISSN 0027-8424. PMC 30144. PMID 11226245.

These are some select publication's from Fleming's tenure at The University of Chicago:

- Haselkorn, R.; Fleming, G. R.; Mets, L.; Newman, J. R.; Lang, M. J.; Jia, Y.; Chan, C. K.; DiMagno, L. (28 March 1995). "Energy transfer and trapping in photosystem I reaction centers from cyanobacteria". Proceedings of the National Academy of Sciences. 92 (7): 2715–2719. Bibcode:1995PNAS...92.2715D. doi:10.1073/pnas.92.7.2715. ISSN 0027-8424. PMC 42289. PMID 7708712.
- Werst, M.; Jia, Y.; Mets, L.; Fleming, G. R. (1992). "Energy transfer and trapping in the photosystem I core antenna. A temperature study". Biophysical Journal. 61 (4): 868–878. Bibcode:1992BpJ....61..868W. doi:10.1016/S0006-3495(92)81894-5. ISSN 0006-3495. PMC 1260346. PMID 1581501.
- Fleming, G. R.; Norris, J. R.; Schiffer, M.; Hanson, D. K.; Schmidt, M.; DiMagno, T. J.; Xie, X.; Rosenthal, S. J.; Du, M. (15 September 1992). "Femtosecond spontaneous-emission studies of reaction centers from photosynthetic bacteria". Proceedings of the National Academy of Sciences. 89 (18): 8517–8521. Bibcode:1992PNAS...89.8517D. doi:10.1073/pnas.89.18.8517. ISSN 0027-8424. PMC 49951. PMID 1528856.
- Fleming, G. R.; Norris, J. R.; Chen, L. X.; DiMagno, T. J.; Chan, C. K. (15 December 1991). "Mechanism of the initial charge separation in bacterial photosynthetic reaction centers". Proceedings of the National Academy of Sciences. 88 (24): 11202–11206. Bibcode:1991PNAS...8811202C. doi:10.1073/pnas.88.24.11202. ISSN 0027-8424. PMC 53102. PMID 1763033.
- Petrich, Jacob W.; Longworth, James W.; Fleming, Graham R. (19 May 1987). "Internal motion and electron transfer in proteins: a picosecond fluorescence study of three homologous azurins". Biochemistry. 26 (10): 2711–2722. doi:10.1021/bi00384a010. ISSN 0006-2960. PMID 3111523.

Finally, these are some additional notable publications from before Fleming began his independent research group:

- Fleming, G. R.; Morris, J. M.; Robbins, R. J.; Woolfe, G. J.; Thistlethwaite, P. J.; Robinson, G. W. (1978). "Nonexponential fluorescence decay of aqueous tryptophan and two related peptides by picosecond spectroscopy". Proceedings of the National Academy of Sciences of the United States of America. 75 (10): 4652–4656. Bibcode:1978PNAS...75.4652F. doi:10.1073/pnas.75.10.4652. ISSN 0027-8424. PMC 336174. PMID 16592569.
- Synowiec, J. A.; Porter, G.; Fleming, G. R.; Beddard, G. S. (1 December 1978). "Picosecond Fluorescence Studies of Photosystem II". Biochemical Society Transactions. 6 (6): 1385–1388. doi:10.1042/bst0061385. ISSN 0300-5127. PMID 744434.
- Beddard, G. S.; Fleming, G. R.; Porter, G.; Searle, G. F.; Synowiec, J. A. (11 January 1979). "The fluorescence decay kinetics of in vivo chlorophyll measured using low intensity excitation". Biochimica et Biophysica Acta (BBA) - Bioenergetics. 545 (1): 165–174. doi:10.1016/0005-2728(79)90123-3. ISSN 0006-3002. PMID 758936.

== Awards and honors ==
- Fellow, American Academy of Arts and Sciences (1991)
- Fellow, Royal Society of London (1994)
- Award from the Inter-American Photochemical Society (1996)
- Award from the Royal Society of Chemistry (1996)
- Centenary Lecture, Royal Society of Chemistry (1996)
- Max T. Rogers Distinguished Lectureship, Michigan State University (1997)
- Peter Debye Award in Physical Chemistry, American Chemical Society (1998)
- Harrison Howe Award in Physical Chemistry, ACS (1999)
- Earle K. Plyler Prize for Molecular Spectroscopy, American Physical Society (2002)
- Sierra Nevada Distinguished Chemist Award (2003)
- Porter Medal, European Photochemistry Association (2004)
- Member, United States National Academy of Sciences (2007)
- Presidential Lecture, Iowa State University (2008)
- Ahmed Zewail Award in Ultrafast Science and Technology, American Chemical Society (2008)
- Joel Henry Hildebrand Award in the Theoretical & Experimental Chemistry of Liquids, American Chemical Society (2009)
