= Sandra J. Rosenthal =

Chemist and nanoscientist

- Born: 1966 (age 59–60)
- Education: Valparaiso University, University of Chicago, UC Berkeley, Lawrence Berkeley National Lab
- Known for: Quantum Dots, Nanomaterials, Electron microscopy, Bioimaging
- Awards: Fellow of the American Association for the Advancement of Science
- Scientific career
- Fields: Nanoscience, Physical Chemistry
- Workplaces: Vanderbilt University, Oak Ridge National Laboratory
- Doctoral advisor: Graham Fleming

Sandra J. Rosenthal (born 1966) is the Jack and Pamela Egan Professor of Chemistry, professor of physics and astronomy, pharmacology, chemical and biomolecular engineering, and materials science at Vanderbilt University. She is a joint faculty member at Oak Ridge National Laboratory in the Materials Science and Technology Division and the director of the Vanderbilt Institute of Nanoscale Science and Engineering.

Rosenthal is a researcher in the field of nanoscience and nanomaterials, most notably quantum dots and nanoclusters. She is the leader of a highly interdisciplinary research team based at Vanderbilt University which is focused on endeavors that span the fundamental study of quantum dots at the atomic scale to the development of designer nanomaterials for applications in diverse research areas ranging from solid-state lighting to biological imaging. A major focus of Rosenthal's current research is "to develop and use nanotechnology to elucidate molecular mechanisms of mental illness".

== Education, career, and service ==
Rosenthal received her B.S. with Honors in the field of Chemistry from Valparaiso University (1987). Rosenthal played 4 years of Division 1 basketball for Valparaiso University while receiving her undergraduate degree.

She went on to receive her Ph.D. in chemistry from the University of Chicago with Graham Fleming where her thesis was on "Femtosecond solvent dynamics: observation of the inertial contribution to the solvent response" (1993). From 1993–1995, Rosenthal was a National Science Foundation Postdoctoral Fellow at Lawrence Berkeley National Lab and UC Berkeley where she worked with Paul Alivisatos and Charles Shank. During her time as a postdoctoral fellow, Rosenthal began her involvement with spectroscopic studies on quantum dots. In 1996, Rosenthal began her independent faculty position on the Chemistry faculty at Vanderbilt University. Her independent research career has continued to be distinguished by her studies on quantum dots and nanomaterials.

At Vanderbilt University, Rosenthal is the director of the Vanderbilt Institute of Nanoscale Science and Engineering and has served in that role for the past 12 years. During her tenure, the program has grown from 24 to 55 faculty members who have been awarded more than $250 million in funding for nanoscience research at the university. The efforts of the Institute have also served to benefit opportunities and access to education in the field nanoscience education at the level of both undergraduate and graduate studies at Vanderbilt. At her undergraduate alma mater Valparaiso University, Rosenthal serves as a member of the Valparaiso University College of Arts and Sciences National Council.

== Awards ==
- Charles Herty Medal, 2018
- Valparaiso University Distinguished Alumni Award, Valparaiso University Alumni Association 2015
- Faculty Achievement Award, Southeastern Conference Universities (SEC) 2014
- Inaugural Jack & Pamela Egan Chair of Chemistry, Vanderbilt University, 2011
- Fellow, American Association for the Advancement of Science, 2011
- Jeffrey Nordhaus Award for Excellence in Undergraduate Teaching, 2009
- Popular Mechanics Breakthrough Award, 2006
- Distinguished Faculty Award, 2004
- Madison-Sarrat Prize for Excellence in Undergraduate Teaching, 2004
- NSF CAREER Award, 1999
- NSF Postdoctoral Fellowship, 1993

== Select publications ==
Prior to her independent research career:

- Rosenthal, S. J.; Yeh, A. T.; Alivisatos, A. P.; Shank, C. V. (1996). "Size Dependent Absorption Anisotropy Measurements of CdSe Nanocrystals: Symmetry Assignments for the Lowest Electronic States". In Barbara, Paul F.; Fujimoto, James G.; Knox, Wayne H.; Zinth, Wolfgang (eds.). Ultrafast Phenomena X. Springer Series in Chemical Physics. Vol. 62. Springer Berlin Heidelberg. pp. 431–432. doi:10.1007/978-3-642-80314-7_188. ISBN 9783642803147. S2CID 102435598.
- Fleming, G. R.; Norris, J. R.; Schiffer, M.; Hanson, D. K.; Schmidt, M.; DiMagno, T. J.; Xie, X.; Rosenthal, S. J.; Du, M. (1992-09-15). "Femtosecond spontaneous-emission studies of reaction centers from photosynthetic bacteria". Proceedings of the National Academy of Sciences. 89 (18): 8517–8521. Bibcode:1992PNAS...89.8517D. doi:10.1073/pnas.89.18.8517. ISSN 0027-8424. PMC 49951. PMID 1528856.

Rosenthal's independent research career has been largely focused on the development of nanomaterials for applications in the energy sciences and the biosciences. She has also notably been one of the earliest advocates and leaders in support of utilizing (and extending capabilities) in electron microscopy for the purpose of advancing understanding of structure-function relationships relevant to the design of nanomaterials towards targeted technological applications. Some select publications from her research efforts are listed below:

- Harrison, Melissa A.; Ng, Amy; Hmelo, Anthony B.; Rosenthal, Sandra J. (2012). "CdSSe Nanocrystals with Induced Chemical Composition Gradients". Israel Journal of Chemistry. 52 (11–12): 1063–1072. doi:10.1002/ijch.201200040. ISSN 1869-5868.
- Niezgoda, J. Scott; Harrison, Melissa A.; McBride, James R.; Rosenthal, Sandra J. (2012-08-28). "Novel Synthesis of Chalcopyrite CuxInyS2 Quantum Dots with Tunable Localized Surface Plasmon Resonances". Chemistry of Materials. 24 (16): 3294–3298. doi:10.1021/cm3021462. ISSN 0897-4756.
- McBride, James R.; Dukes, Albert D.; Schreuder, Michael A.; Rosenthal, Sandra J. (2010-09-30). "On Ultrasmall Nanocrystals". Chemical Physics Letters. 498 (1–3): 1–9. Bibcode:2010CPL...498....1M. doi:10.1016/j.cplett.2010.08.052. ISSN 0009-2614. PMC 2994270. PMID 21132106.
- Swafford, Laura A.; Weigand, Lauren A.; Bowers, Michael J.; McBride, James R.; Rapaport, Jason L.; Watt, Tony L.; Dixit, Sriram K.; Feldman, Leonard C.; Rosenthal, Sandra J. (2006-09-01). "Homogeneously Alloyed CdSxSe1-x Nanocrystals: Synthesis, Characterization, and Composition/Size-Dependent Band Gap". Journal of the American Chemical Society. 128 (37): 12299–12306. Bibcode:2006JAChS.12812299S. doi:10.1021/ja063939e. ISSN 0002-7863. PMID 16967981.
