= PhysChemComm =

- Discipline: Chemistry
- Language: English
- Edited by: Susan Appleyard

Publication details
- History: 1998-2003
- Publisher: Royal Society of Chemistry (United Kingdom)
- Impact factor: 1.500 (2005)

Standard abbreviations
- ISO 4: PhysChemComm

Indexing
- CODEN: PHCCFX
- ISSN: 1460-2733
- LCCN: sn99047155
- OCLC no.: 40310988

Links
- Journal homepage

PhysChemComm was a peer-reviewed scientific journal that was published by the Royal Society of Chemistry between 1998 and 2003. It covered all aspects of physical chemistry and chemical physics, and their interfaces with condensed matter, physics and biological, materials and surface science. The journal was abstracted and indexed in Chemical Abstracts Service and Scopus. According to the Journal Citation Reports, the journal's last impact factor of 1.500 was issued in 2005.

== See also ==
- Physical Chemistry Chemical Physics
