= Optics Express =

- Discipline: Optics, photonics
- Language: English
- Edited by: Siddharth Ramachandran

Publication details
- History: 1997–present
- Publisher: Optica (United States)
- Frequency: Biweekly
- Open access: Yes
- Impact factor: 3.4 (2025)

Standard abbreviations
- ISO 4: Opt. Express

Indexing
- CODEN: OPEXFF
- ISSN: 1094-4087 (print); 1094-4087 (web)
- OCLC no.: 37160672

Links
- Journal homepage; Online access; Online archive

Optics Express is a biweekly peer-reviewed scientific journal published by Optica. It was established in 1997. The journal reports on scientific and technology innovations in all aspects of optics and photonics. The Energy Express supplement reports research on the science and engineering of light and its impact on sustainable energy development, the environment, and green technologies. The editor-in-chief is Siddharth Ramachandran (Boston University).
