= Biomedical Optics Express =

- Discipline: Optics in the life sciences
- Language: English
- Edited by: Ruikang (Ricky) Wang

Publication details
- History: 2010–present
- Publisher: Optica
- Frequency: Monthly
- Open access: Yes
- Impact factor: 2.9 (2023)

Standard abbreviations
- ISO 4: Biomed. Opt. Express

Indexing
- CODEN: BOEICL
- ISSN: 2156-7085
- OCLC no.: 650509280

Links
- Journal homepage; Online access; Online archive

Biomedical Optics Express is a monthly peer-reviewed scientific journal published by Optica. The journal's scope encompasses fundamental research and technology development of optics applied to biomedical studies and clinical applications. The founding and first editor-in-chief is Joseph A. Izatt (Duke University). The current editor-in-chief is Ruikang (Ricky) Wang at the University of Washington, USA.

== Abstracting and indexing ==
The journal is abstracted and indexed by:

- Science Citation Index Expanded
- Current Contents/Engineering, Computing & Technology
- Chemical Abstracts Service/CASSI
- PubMed

According to the Journal Citation Reports, the journal has a 2023 impact factor of 2.9.
