= James Chappuis =

French scientist (1854–1934)

Louis Philibert Claude James Chappuis (born 10 November 1854 in Besançon; died 29 January 1934 in Paris) was a French chemist and physicist. He is known for the discovery of Chappuis absorption by the ozone layer which is partially responsible for the color of the sky during the so called blue hour.

== Life ==
Chappuis was the son of philosophy teacher Charles Chappuis (1822–1897, lived from 1845 to 1869 in Besançon) and Louise Lydie Berthot (died 1909), a granddaughter of Nicolas Berthot, a mathematician in Dijon. He attended schools in Besançon, Caen and Grenoble. He enrolled in the École normale supérieure (ENS) in Paris in 1874, then worked as a physics teacher at Montauban in 1877, and at Poitiers in 1878. He returned to Paris and was a Maître de conférences at the ENS from 1878 to 1882, passing the Agrégé in 1879. In 1881, he was appointed as Professor of Physics at the École centrale des arts et manufactures, and attained the doctoral degree in 1882 with a thesis on the spectroscopy of ozone. He led the research laboratory of the Societé du Gaz de Paris.

Chappuis is interred in the family tomb in Chailly-sur-Armançon. He was uncle to his namesake James Chappuis, director of the automobile-maker Citroën; the latter died in 1926 and is also interred at Chaily. He is not to be confused with the Swiss physicist Pierre Chappuis (1855–1916), also a professor of physics at the École Centrale.

== Research ==
After the Swiss chemist Jacques-Louis Soret discovered in 1863 that ozone is a three-atom molecule of oxygen (O_{3}), numerous researchers detected ozone in the atmosphere through spectroscopy, among them Chappuis in 1880. Chappuis was the first known researcher to find that ozone was responsible for giving light that passes through it a bluish tint. He attributed this to absorption of yellow, orange, and red light by ozone. Ozone in the upper atmosphere, where pressure and temperature are low, is hence an important element for the blue color of the sky. This effect is known today as Chappuis absorption. In 1882, Paul Hautefeuille and Chappuis published the results of laboratory experiments showing that ozone could be purified and condensed to a deep blue liquid at temperatures under -112 degrees Celsius.

Rayleigh scattering was already known in the 1880s, and was thought by contemporary scientists to be a sufficient explanation for the blue color of the sky. Chappuis's discovery was hence forgotten for a time. In 1952, the American geophysicist Edward Hulburt found that the blue color of the sky at sunset during the so-called blue hour could not be explained by Rayleigh scattering, and that the effect of Chappuis absorption by the ozone layer must be taken into account. The French meteorologist Jean Dubois proposed in 1951, that the Earth's shadow on the horizon could also be explained by Chappuis absorption, but this hypothesis was later disproven.

Chappuis was one of the first users of Crookes tubes in 1896.

The physician Jean François Moreau called Chappuis "one of the forgotten pioneers of clinical radiology". Chappuis had experimented in the 1890s with X-rays for intrauterine photography.

== Selected publications ==
- with Alphonse Berget: Leçons de physique générale, 3 volumes, Paris 1891–1892, 2. Auflage 1899–1911, 3rd edition 1923
- with Alphonse Berget: Cours de physique, Paris 1898
- with Alexis Jacquet: Éléments de physique industrielle, Paris, 3rd edition 1914, 11th edition 1949
