= Richard Tousey =

American astronomer

Richard Tousey (May 18, 1908 – April 15, 1997) was an American astronomer. He was a pioneer in the observation of the sun from space and took the first photographs of the sun's ultraviolet spectrum.

Richard Tousey was born on May 18, 1908, in Somerville, Massachusetts, to Coleman and Adella Hill Tousey. He received a bachelor's degree from Tufts University (1928), then MA (1929) and Ph.D.(1933) in physics from Harvard University. His dissertation related to measuring optical properties of fluorite at 1216 angstroms was completed under Theodore Lyman.

Tousey taught and conducted research at Harvard from 1933 to 1936, then Tufts until 1941. Upon invitation by E.O. Hulburt, Tousey joined the Naval Research Laboratory where his initial work focused on night vision. Using captured V-2 rockets made available for research at White Sands Missile Range, he was able to measure the first ultraviolet (UV) spectrum of the sun.

He married Ruth Lowe in 1932 and together they had one daughter, Joanna. The family shared an interest in music and collected musical instruments. They also collected and researched antique silverware and its makers. Richard was a member of the American Silver Guild.

Tousey died of pneumonia on April 15, 1997, at Prince Georges Hospital Center in Maryland.

== Honors ==
- Fellow of The Optical Society (1959)
- Frederic Ives Medal (1960)
- Honorary Doctor of Science from Tufts (1961)
- Henry Draper Medal (1963)
- Eddington Medal (1964)
- Henry Norris Russell Lectureship (1966)
