= Eduard von Engerth =

Austrian painter (1818–1897)

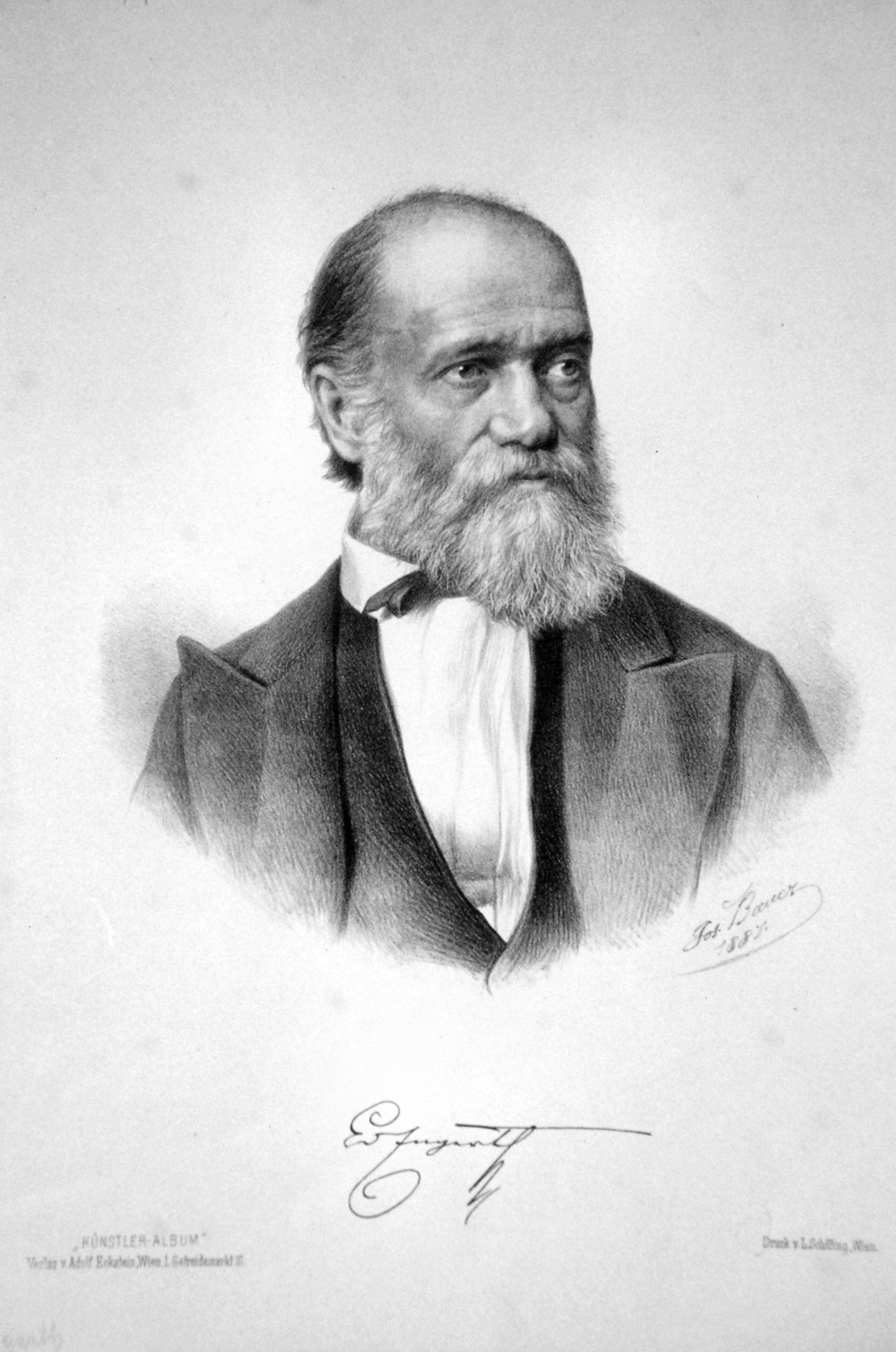
Eduard von Engerth (1887). Lithograph by Josef Anton Bauer (1820-1904)

Edouard Ritter von Engerth (13 May 1818 – 1897) was an Austrian historical portrait painter.

== Biography ==
He was born at Pless, Prussian Silesia, and studied under Leopold Kupelwieser at the Academy of Fine Arts Vienna, where, in 1845, he obtained the grand prize and the imperial stipend attached to it. In 1854 he was appointed director of the Prague Academy; in 1865, professor at the Vienna Academy; in 1871, director of the Belvedere Gallery, and in 1874 rector of the Academy. He was made commander of the Order of Francis Joseph in 1867.

== Work ==
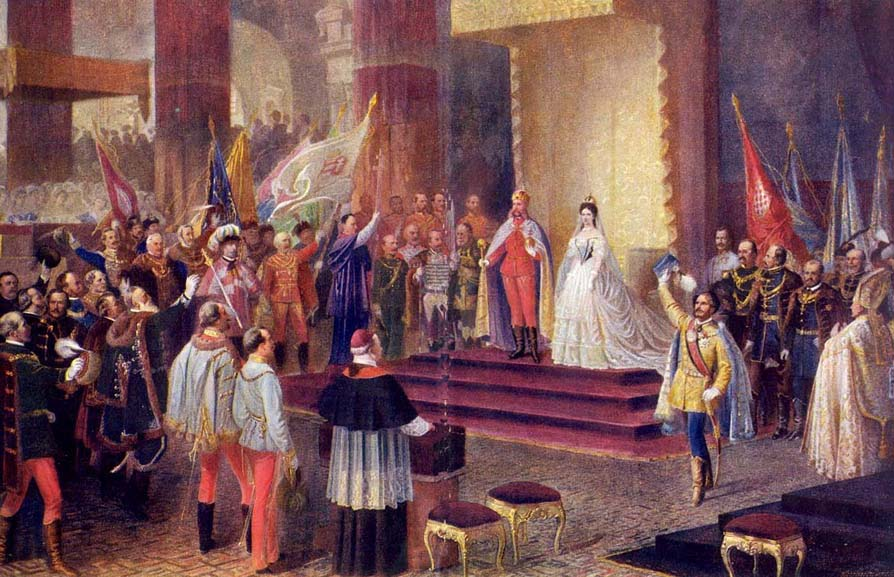
Coronation of Emperor Franz Joseph and Empress Elisabeth of Austria as King and Queen of Hungary, on June 8, 1867, in Buda. —Work of Ödön Tull, after Eduard Engerth

His most celebrated picture is entitled “Seizure of King Manfred's Family After the Battle of Benevento” (Art Museum, Vienna). His painting entitled “The Victory of Prince Eugene at Zenta” is also highly esteemed. Among his other works are “Haman and Esther”; “Ladislaus and Akus” (1844); “Coronation of Rudolph I” and “Joseph Explaining the Dream” (1845); “Seizure of King Manfred's Family” (1853), a masterpiece in the Vienna Museum; “Victory of Prince Eugene at Zenta” (1865); “Marriage of Figaro” and “Fable of Orpheus” (1868); “Coronation of Francis Joseph as King of Hungary” (1870); “Death of Eurydice” (1877). Engerth frescoed the church at Alt Lerchenfeld after the cartoons of Führich, painted numerous portraits and decorated the new Vienna Opera House.

== Family ==
He was the brother of the engineer Wilhelm von Engerth.
