= David Rank =

Diagram of a RKE eyepiece developed by Rank

David Herr Rank (January 2, 1907 – January 17, 1981) was an American spectroscopist.

Rank was born in Annville, Pennsylvania and attended Lebanon Valley College in his hometown. He pursued graduate study at Pennsylvania State University beginning in 1930 and joined the faculty in 1935. Rank was appointed the Evan Pugh Professor in Physics in 1961. He retired in 1972 and died at Centre County Community Hospital in State College, Pennsylvania, on January 17, 1981, aged 74.

He was a Fellow of The Optical Society and APS, and he received the Frederic Ives Medal in 1969.
