= Arthur F. Turner =

- Scientific career
- Fields: Physics
- Institutions: Bausch and Lomb, University of Arizona

Arthur F. Turner was president of the Optical Society of America in 1968. He is well known for his contributions to the field of optical thin-film coatings. He was awarded the Technical Oscar in 1959 for the Balcold projection mirror, and the Frederic Ives Medal in 1971.

== See also ==
- Optical Society of America § Past Presidents of the OSA
