= Anthony J. DeMaria =

American physicist and engineer (1931–2025)

- Born: 30 October 1931; Italy
- Died: 26 January 2025 (aged 93); Southwick, Massachusetts, U.S.
- Awards: Frederic Ives Medal (1988); IEEE Liebmann Award (1980)
- Scientific career
- Fields: Physics

Anthony J. DeMaria (30 October 1931 – 26 January 2025) was an American researcher in lasers and their applications, particularly known for his work with picosecond laser pulses.

DeMaria received his Ph.D. in engineering physics from the University of Connecticut in 1956, and worked from 1960 to 1994 at the United Technologies Corporation Research Center, performing research in acousto-optics application to lasers, passive Q-switching and mode-locking of glass lasers, fast flow and wave-guide RF excited CO_{2} lasers, CO_{2} laser radar systems, and fiber-optics sensors, ultimately serving as Assistant Director of Research 1985-1994. In 1994 he founded DeMaria ElectroOptics Systems, which was sold in 2001 to Coherent, Inc., of which he is currently chief scientist. He is also a professor in residence at the ECE Department, University of Connecticut, and has been adjunct professor of Rensselaer Polytechnic Institute and Distinguished Fairchild Scholar at the California Institute of Technology (1982–83).

DeMaria holds 45 patents. He was elected a member of the US National Academy of Engineering in 1976 for developing picosecond mode-locked lasers and contributions to high-power lasers. He is a member of the National Academy of Sciences, past president of the Connecticut Academy of Science and Engineering, Optical Society of America, and SPIE, and fellow of the American Physical Society, Institute of Electrical and Electronics Engineers, Optical Society of America, and SPIE. He received the 1980 IEEE Morris N. Liebmann Memorial Award "for contributions to the initiation and demonstration of the first picosecond optical pulse generator".

DeMaria died on 26 January 2025, at the age of 93.

== See also ==
- Optical Society of America#Past Presidents of the OSA
- Frederic Ives Medal
