= Frederic Ives Medal =

The Frederic Ives Medal is the highest award of the Optica, recognizing overall distinction in optics. The prize was established in 1928 by Herbert E. Ives in honor of his father, Frederic Ives. Initially awarded every two years, it has been awarded annually since 1951. The prize is funded by the Jarus W. Quinn Ives Medal Endowment.

== Recipients ==
Year	Recipient	Citation
1929	Edward L. Nichols	For distinguished work in optics.
1931	Theodore Lyman	For distinguished work in optics.
1933	Robert W. Wood	For distinguished work in optics.
1935	George E. Hale	For distinguished work in optics.
1937	Herbert E. Ives	For distinguished work in optics.
1939	August H. Pfund	For distinguished work in optics.
1941	Selig Hecht	For distinguished work in optics.
1943	Loyd A. Jones	For distinguished work in optics.
1945	William W. Coblentz	For distinguished work in optics.
1947	William F. Meggers	For distinguished work in optics.
1949	George R. Harrison	For distinguished work in optics.
1951	Brian O'Brien	For distinguished work in optics.
1952	Ira S. Bowen	For distinguished work in optics.
1953	Harrison M. Randall	For distinguished work in optics.
1954	Irvine Clifton Gardner	For distinguished work in optics.
1955	Edward Olson Hulburt	For distinguished work in optics.
1956	John Donovan Strong	For distinguished work in optics.
1957	Arthur C. Hardy	For distinguished work in optics.
1958	Deane B. Judd	For distinguished work in optics.
1959	W. E. Knowles Middleton	For distinguished work in optics.
1960	Richard Tousey	For distinguished work in optics.
1961	Seibert Q. Duntley	For distinguished work in optics.
1962	Max Herzberger	For distinguished work in optics.
1963	Ralph A. Sawyer	For distinguished work in optics.
1964	Gerhard Herzberg	For distinguished work in optics.
1965	James G. Baker	For distinguished work in optics.
1966	George Wald	For distinguished work in optics.
1967	Edwin H. Land	For distinguished work in optics.
1968	Edward U. Condon	For distinguished work in optics.
1969	David H. Rank	For distinguished work in optics.
1970	Robert E. Hopkins	For distinguished work in optics.
1971	A. Francis Turner	For distinguished work in optics.
1972	R. Clark Jones	For distinguished work in optics.
1973	Rudolf Kingslake	For distinguished work in optics.
1974	David MacAdam	For distinguished work in optics.
1975	Ali Javan	For distinguished work in optics.
1976	Arthur L. Schawlow	In recognition of his pioneering role in the invention of the laser, his continuing originality in the refinement of coherent optical sources, his productive vision in the application of optics to science and technology, his distinguished service to optics education and to the optics community, and his innovative contributions to the public understanding of optical science.
1977	Emil Wolf	For his many contributions to our understanding of electromagnetic theory and physical optics, particularly for his work in diffraction and the theory of partial coherence, and for his contributions to the tutorial literature as author and editor.
1978	Harold H. Hopkins	In recognition of his many unique contributions to the field of optics, including aberration theory, optical design, image evaluation, coherence theory, interferometry, and fiber optics..
1979	Nicolaas Bloembergen	In recognition of his achievement in establishing the theoretical framework of nonlinear optics, his sustained innovative contributions to the exploration of all aspects in the field of nonlinear optical phenomena, and his successes in the role of teacher and interpreter of science.
1980	Aden B. Meinel	For his contributions to thermal solar energy, analysis of the principles of coherently combined, independent telescopes, and the leadership he has given to several major optical and astronomical research centers.
1981	Georg H. Hass	In recognition of his contributions to the understanding of the structure and behavior of evaporated thin films and the application of these films to reflective and anti-reflective coatings for both the visible and the ultraviolet spectral regions.
1982	Lorrin A. Riggs	In recognition of a lifetime of pioneering in electrophysiological, psychophysical, and other studies of the visual process; his years of public service in the field of vision; and his genius for inspiring generations of students to create their own distinguished careers in vision.
1983	Boris P. Stoicheff	For his contributions to high resolution Raman spectroscopy, nonlinear optics and the applications of nonlinear optics to atomic and molecular spectroscopy.
1984	Herwig Kogelnik	For pioneering contributions to holography, lasers, and integrated optics.
1985	Emmett N. Leith	For contributions to modern holography, information processing, and electromagnetics.
1986	Amnon Yariv	For his numerous pioneering contributions to lasers, optoelectronics, and phase conjugate optics.
1987	Anthony E. Siegman	For contribution to the field of quantum electronics, particularly research on unstable resonators and mode-locked lasers, as well as contributions to the education of a generation of optical scientists.
1988	Anthony J. DeMaria	For outstanding contributions to the field of optics and quantum electronics, particularly the first demonstration of optical picosecond pulses using mode-locked lasers, and pioneering contributions to the application of lasers in industry and scientific research.
1989	C. Kumar N. Patel	In recognition of his illustrious career in optics and materials sciences and his exemplary service in scientific management..
1990	Joseph W. Goodman	For his outstanding technical contributions to the field of coherent optics and for his equally important and continuing contributions to modern optics education and to scientific communication.
1991	John L. Hall	In recognition of his outstanding contributions to laser frequency stabilization, innovations in high resolution laser spectroscopy, and high accuracy tests of fundamental physical laws.
1992	Robert W. Terhune	In recognition of his many pioneering contributions to the field of nonlinear optics, as well as his service to the optics community.
1993	Leonard Mandel	In recognition of his contributions to coherence theory and to the fundamental understanding of quantum mechanics and the nature of the photon.
1994	Hermann A. Haus	For his fundamental and seminal contribution to the understanding of quantum noise in optical systems and for a lifetime of dedication to science and engineering education.
1995	Robert M. Boynton	To recognize fundamental contributions to the understanding of human color vision, and for leadership in teaching and in service to the vision community.
1996	Charles H. Townes	For five decades of major contributions to the field of optics, including research, education and administration, but especially for his inspiring creativity in optical physics, from quantum electronics to airborne infrared astronomy.
1997	Tingye Li	For his leadership and contributions to lightwave science and technology, ranging from fundamental studies of modes in laser resonators to remarkable implementations of advanced optical communications systems.
1998	Arthur Ashkin	For his pioneering work on the manipulation of particles with light, including the invention of the "optical tweezers" trap and his studies of radiation forces on atoms and for important contributions to nonlinear optics.
1999	Stephen E. Harris	For pioneering work in nonlinear optics, XUV lasers and laser spectroscopy, from electromagnetically induced transparency and lasing without inversion to nonlinear optics at maximal coherence.
2000	Alexander Prokhorov	For his distinguished contributions and monumental role over the past 45 years in creating and developing quantum electronics.
2001	Nick Holonyak, Jr.	For pioneering work in the field of semiconductor lasers and LEDs.
2002	James P. Gordon	For numerous seminal contributions and fundamental insights into quantum electronics, including construction of the first maser, the concept of confocal laser resonators, optical solitons, and quantum effects in communications systems.
2003	Herbert Walther	For pioneering contributions to quantum optics, including the development of the micromaser and the demonstration of Wigner crystallization of laser-cooled ions.
2004	David J. Wineland	For development of laser-manipulated quantum engineering at the single-atom level and application of these methods to quantum logic systems, atomic frequency standards, and fundamental tests of quantum mechanics.
2005	Theodor W. Hänsch	For seminal contributions and landmark advances in optical science and atomic physics, including narrow-band dye lasers, Doppler-free laser spectroscopy, laser cooling of atomic gases, precision spectroscopy of atomic hydrogen, frequency metrology with optical combs, and new physics with cold atoms in optical lattices.
2006	Erich P. Ippen	For laying the foundations of ultrafast science and engineering and providing vision and sustained leadership to the optics community.
2007	Daniel Kleppner	For sustained innovation, discovery and leadership in the interaction of radiation with atoms and for his service and general educational activities.
2008	Peter L. Knight	For his immense contribution to optics through pioneering research in quantum optics and by his unique combination of educational, organization and leadership skills.
2009	Robert L. Byer	For pioneering contributions to optical science and the commercial development of optical technologies and for wide-ranging leadership activities within the optics community.
2010	Joseph H. Eberly	For many important research contributions to quantum optics and optical physics, his leadership as a teacher and educator, and his tireless and visionary service to the optics community.
2011	Ivan Paul Kaminow	For pioneering research in high-speed modulators, ridge waveguide lasers and wavelength-division-multiplexed optical networks, and each has had a profound impact on modern communication systems.
2012	Marlan O. Scully	For lifetime leadership in groundbreaking research on all aspects of quantum optics including the quantum theory of the laser, quantum coherence effects, quantum thermodynamics and the foundations of quantum mechanics.
2013	Alain Aspect	For carrying out pioneering research on photons and atoms shedding light on the most intriguing quantum phenomena and prompting the development of the new field of quantum information.
2014	Paul B. Corkum	For outstanding contributions to the foundation of the fields of attosecond science, high-harmonic spectroscopy and molecular optics.
2015	James G. Fujimoto	For pioneering the field of optical coherence tomography (OCT) and for leading the field to widespread medical application and major commercial impact.
2016	Gérard Mourou	For numerous pioneering contributions to the development of ultrafast and ultrahigh intensity laser science and for outstanding leadership of the international and commercial communities impacted by these technologies.
2017	Margaret Murnane	For pioneering and sustained contributions to ultrafast science ranging from femtosecond lasers to soft x-ray high-harmonic generation to attosecond studies of atoms, molecules and surfaces.
2018	Rod C. Alferness	For basic contributions and leadership in the development of integrated optics, high-speed optical modulation and switching, and configurable WDM networks that have provided significant economic and societal impact.
2019	Eli Yablonovitch	For diverse and deep contributions to optical science including photonic crystals, strained semiconductor lasers, and new record-breaking solar cell physics.
2020	Ursula Keller	For fundamental contributions to ultrafast lasers technology, especially in the development of high peak and average power oscillators and important breakthroughs in attosecond science.
2021	Federico Capasso	For seminal and wide-ranging contributions to optical physics, quantum electronics and nanophotonics.
2022	James C. Wyant	For pioneering contributions in advancing the science and technology of quantitative interferometric metrology, his leadership as an educator and entrepreneur, and his visionary service to the global optics and photonics community.
2023	Robert W. Boyd	For pioneering contributions to nonlinear optics, including slow light, quantum imaging and the development of nanocomposite optical materials and metamaterials.
2024	Kenichi Iga	For pioneering contributions and visionary leadership in the field of semiconductor lasers and optoelectronics and a dedication to training and educating future generations.
2025	David A. B. Miller	For fundamental scientific and engineering research contributions spanning multiple areas, including optics in digital systems, fundamentals of optics and waves, and complex and controllable photonic circuits.
2026	Tony Heinz	For pioneering discoveries in photon science, outstanding leadership, and a deep commitment to education.

== See also ==
- List of physics awards
