= Edward Olson Hulburt =

American geophysicist (1890–1982)

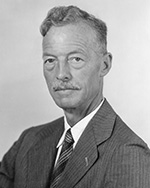
- Born: 12 October 1890; Vermillion, South Dakota, US
- Died: 11 October 1982 (aged 91); Easton, Maryland, US
- Education: Johns Hopkins University
- Known for: research on the ionosphere and blue hour
- Notable work: "Explanation of the Brightness and Color of the Sky, Particularly the Twilight Sky"
- Awards: Frederic Ives Medal (1955); John Adam Fleming Medal (1964)
- Scientific career
- Fields: geophysics
- Workplaces: United States Naval Research Laboratory

Edward Olson Hulburt (12 October 1890 – 11 October 1982) was an American geophysicist who studied the properties of the ionosphere and the color of the sky at the blue hour.

== Life and career ==
Hulburt was born in Vermillion, South Dakota, on 12 October 1890. He was educated at Johns Hopkins University, where his father was a professor of mathematics. He worked for 31 years at the United States Naval Research Laboratory, serving as head of the Physical Optics Division from 1929 to 1949, and Director of Research from 1949 to 1955.

In 1926, he and Albert H. Taylor worked out several basic characteristics of the ionosphere, including the distribution of its electron density and dependence on solar elevation, by studying the propagation of radio signals in the atmosphere. They collaborated with Gregory Breit and Merle Tuve in the development of the ionosonde device used to study the ionosphere. Hulburt also studied how solar X-rays and extreme ultraviolet radiation were responsible for ionization in E- and F-regions of the upper atmosphere, with the use of V-2 rockets captured from Germany at the end of World War II to make high-altitude observations.

Hulburt also studied other physical phenomena. He developed a model of the greenhouse effect of the atmosphere in 1931. In 1953 he published a study showing that the blue color of the sky during the blue hour is largely due to Chappuis absorption by the ozone layer, in contrast to the blue color in the day-time caused by Rayleigh scattering. During World War II, he advised the United States Navy on camouflage designs for its ships.

His honors and awards included the Frederic Ives Medal of the Optical Society of America (1955), the John Adam Fleming Medal of the American Geophysical Union (1964), and the degree of Doctor of Humane Letters from Johns Hopkins University (1980).

Hulburt died in Easton, Maryland, on 11 October 1982.

== Selected publications ==
- A. Hoyt Taylor and E. O. Hulburt (1926). "The Propagation of Radio Waves Over the Earth," Phys. Rev. 27, 189. doi:10.1103/PhysRev.27.189
- E. O. Hulburt (1931). "The Temperature of the Lower Atmosphere of the Earth," Phys. Rev. 38, 1876. doi:10.1103/PhysRev.38.1876
- E. O. Hulburt (1953). "Explanation of the Brightness and Color of the Sky, Particularly the Twilight Sky," J. Opt. Soc. Am. 43, 113–118. doi:10.1364/JOSA.43.000113
