= Blue hour =

Period of twilight in the morning or evening

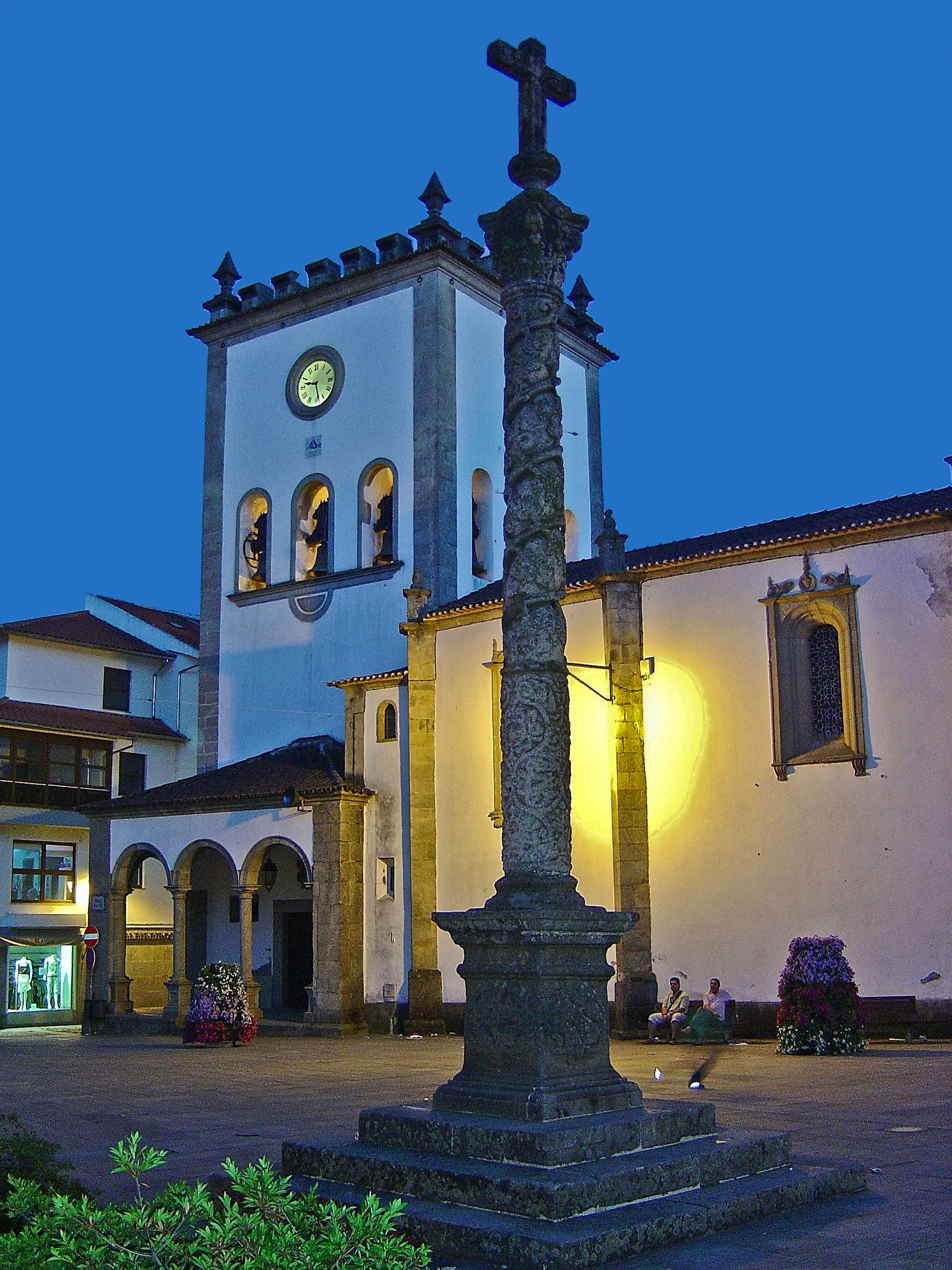
Blue hour at the Old Cathedral of the Holy Name of Jesus, Bragança in Portugal

The blue hour (from French l'heure bleue; (Note: A similar calque is used in many languages.) pronounced [lœʁ blø]) is the period of twilight (in the dawn or dusk, around the nautical stage) when the Sun is several degrees below the horizon. During this time, the remaining sunlight takes on a mostly blue shade. This shade differs from the colour of the sky on a clear day, which is caused by Rayleigh scattering.

The blue hour occurs when the Sun is far enough below the horizon so that the sunlight's blue wavelengths dominate due to the Chappuis absorption in the ozone layer. Since the term is colloquial, it lacks an official definition such as nautical dawn, nautical dusk, or the three stages of twilight. Rather, blue hour refers to the state of natural lighting that usually occurs around the nautical stage of the twilight period (at dawn or dusk).

The blue hour is shorter in regions near the equator due to the sun rising and setting at steep angles. In places closer to the poles, the illumination and twilight periods are longer as the sun rises and sets at shallower angles.

== Explanation and times of occurrence ==
A still commonly presented but incorrect explanation for the blue hue is that after sunset and before sunrise the atmosphere receives and disperses only the sun's shorter, blue wavelengths, while the longer, reddish wavelengths are scattered away. In fact, the blue hour occurs when the Sun is far enough below the horizon so that the sunlight's blue wavelengths dominate due to the Chappuis absorption caused by ozone.

When the sky is clear, the blue hour can be a colourful spectacle, with the indirect sunlight tinting the sky yellow, orange, red, and blue. The deep blue of the sky overhead comes from ozone in the upper atmosphere absorbing red light, which differs from the scattering that makes the daytime sky blue.

At mid-latitudes the blue hour usually lasts about 20 to 30 minutes, shortly after sunset and before sunrise, and its exact timing varies with location. Its duration depends on latitude and season: at about 40° north or south it lasts around 20 minutes in March, and in Oslo roughly 30 minutes at the same time of year, while during the polar night it can last for several hours.

== Art ==
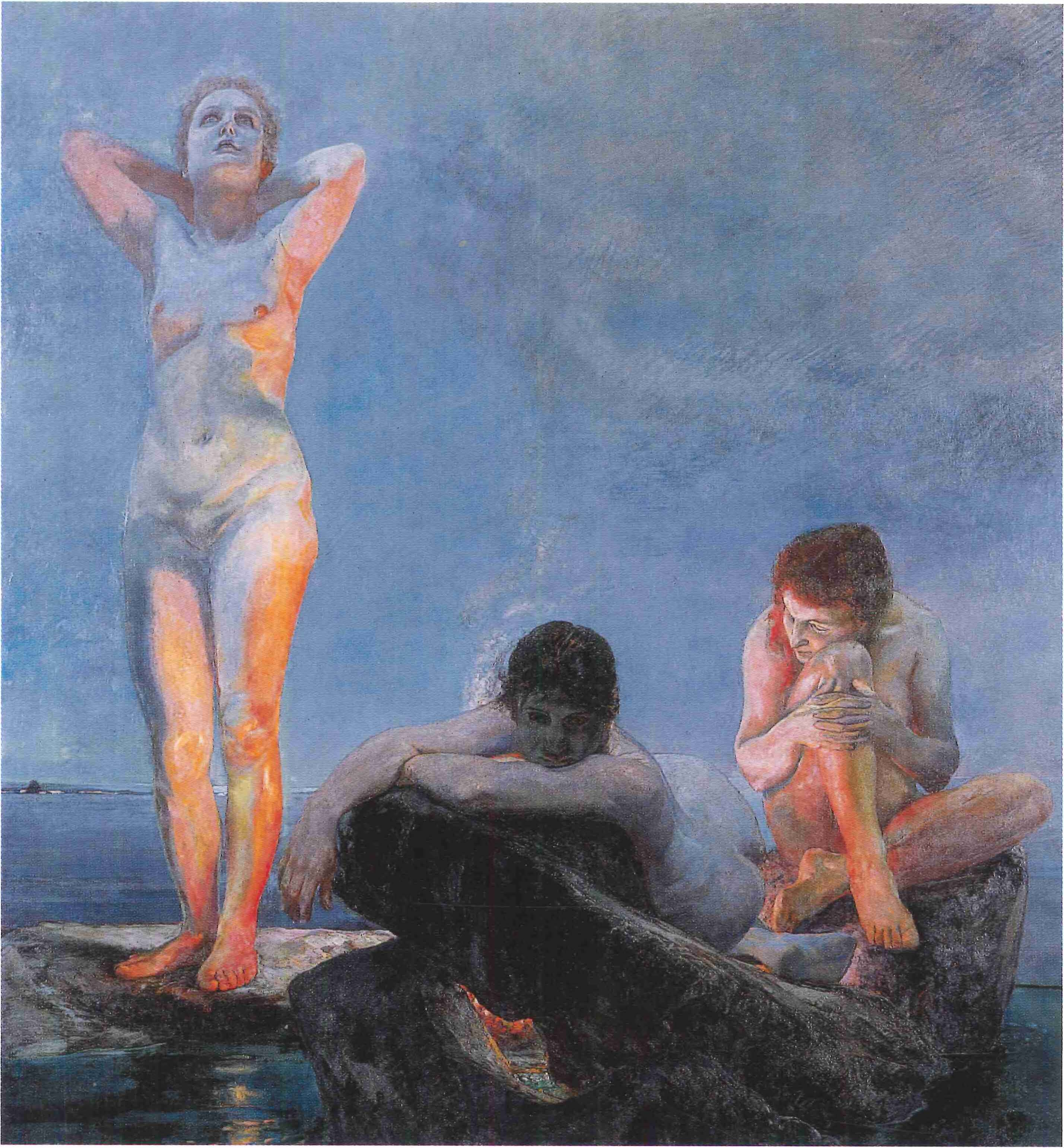
Die blaue Stunde (1890), painting by Max Klinger

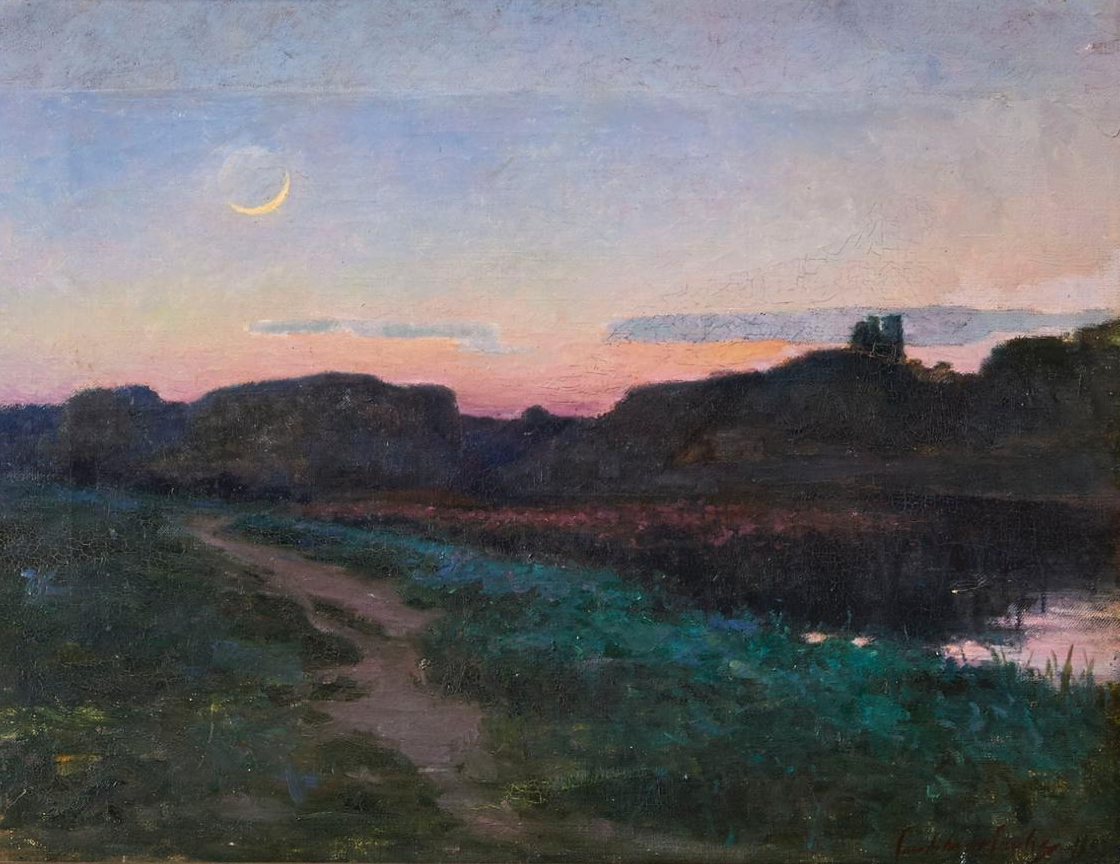
Sunset (1897), painting by António Cândido da Cunha

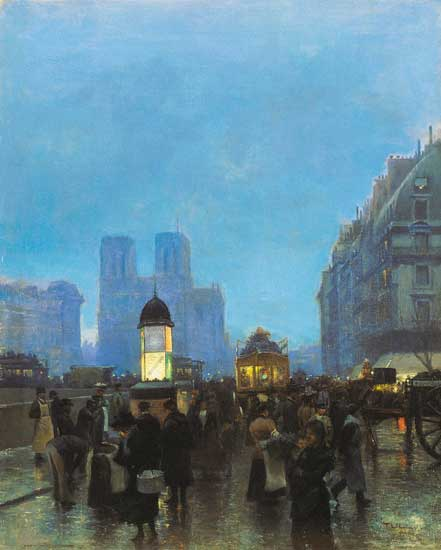
Twilight (1897), painting by Edmund Tull (Ödön Tull)

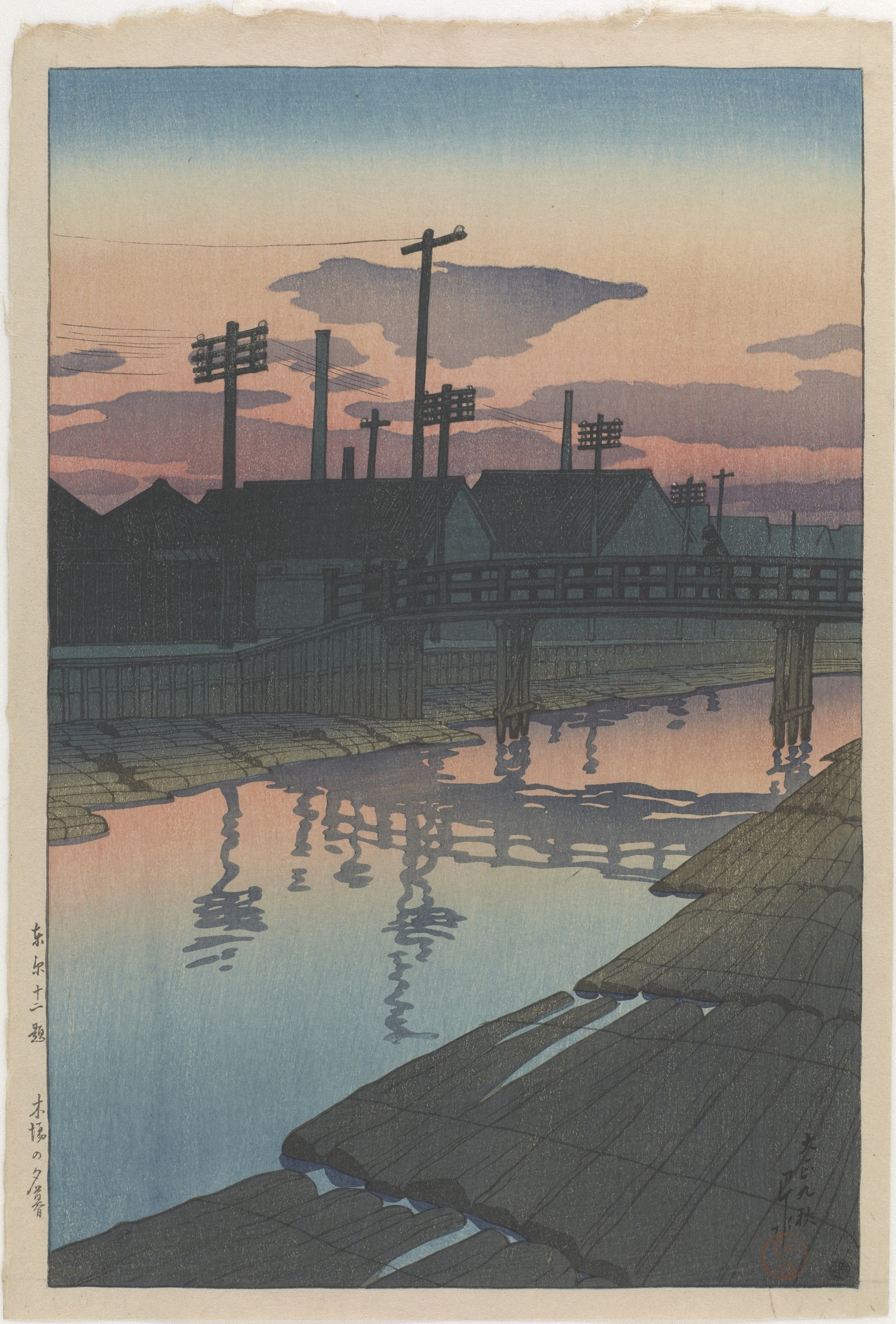
Evening at the Lumber Yards of Kiba (1920), woodcut by Kawase Hasui

== Photography ==
Many artists value this period for the quality of the soft light. Although the blue hour does not have an official definition, the blue color spectrum is most prominent when the Sun is between 4° and 8° below the horizon. Photography planning applications use narrower or wider ranges, from 4°–6° to as much as 3°–10° below the horizon.

Photographers use blue hour for the tranquil mood it sets. The blue hour is well suited to subjects with artificial light sources, such as buildings, monuments, cityscapes, or bridges, because of the contrast between the blue sky and artificial light.

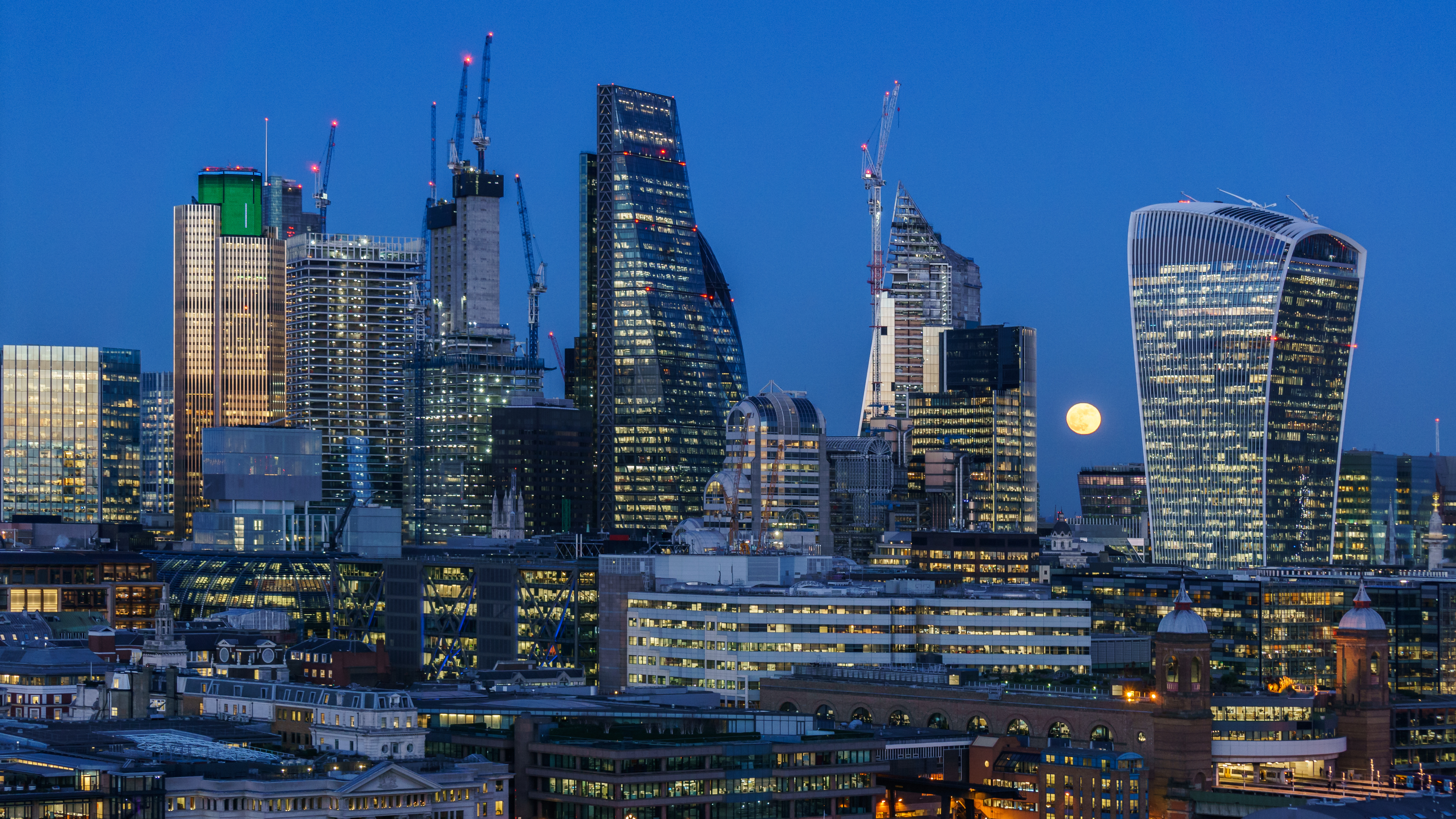
The City of London during the blue hour

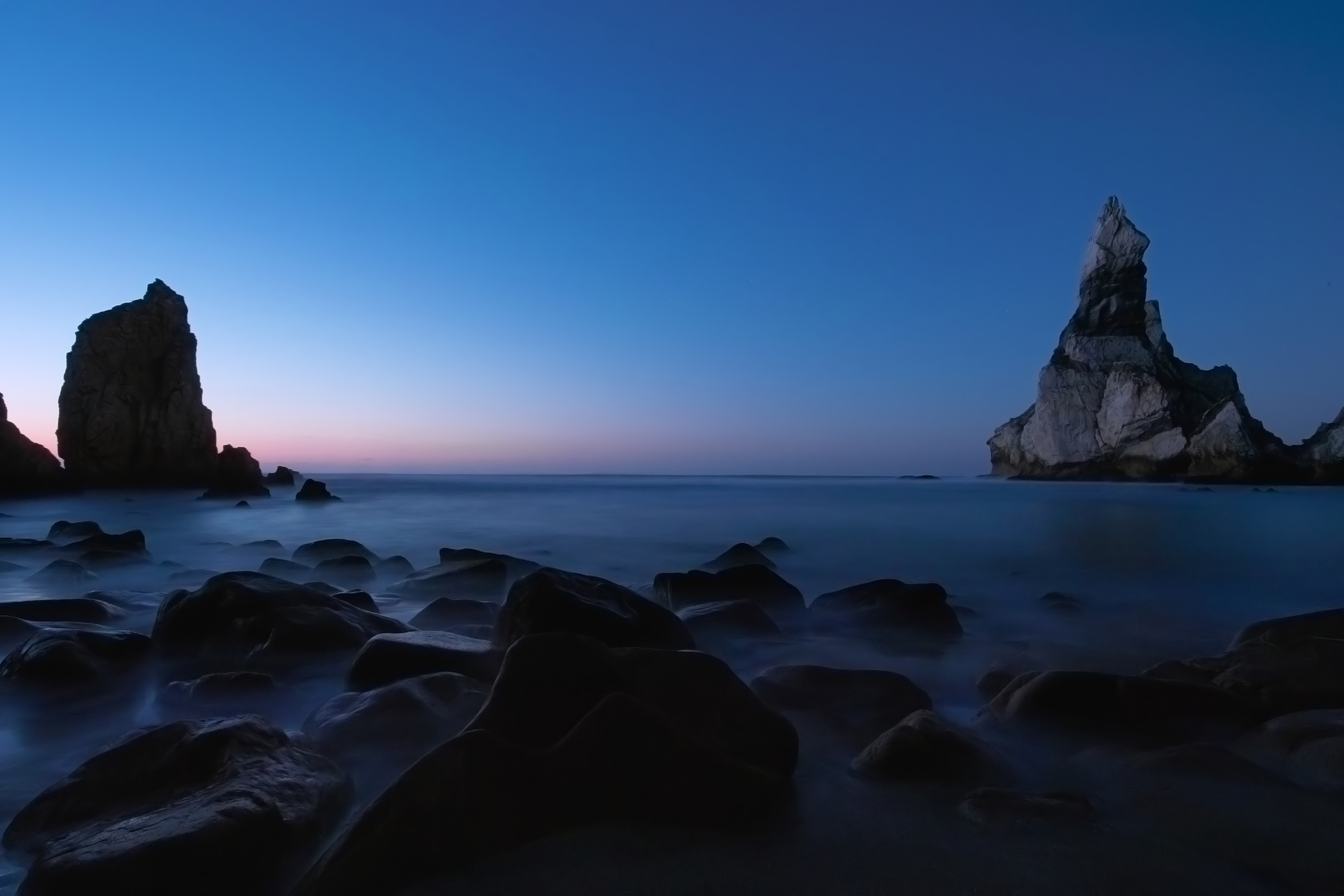
Praia da Ursa, Cabo da Roca, Portugal. A wide-angle view of the seascape during the blue hour

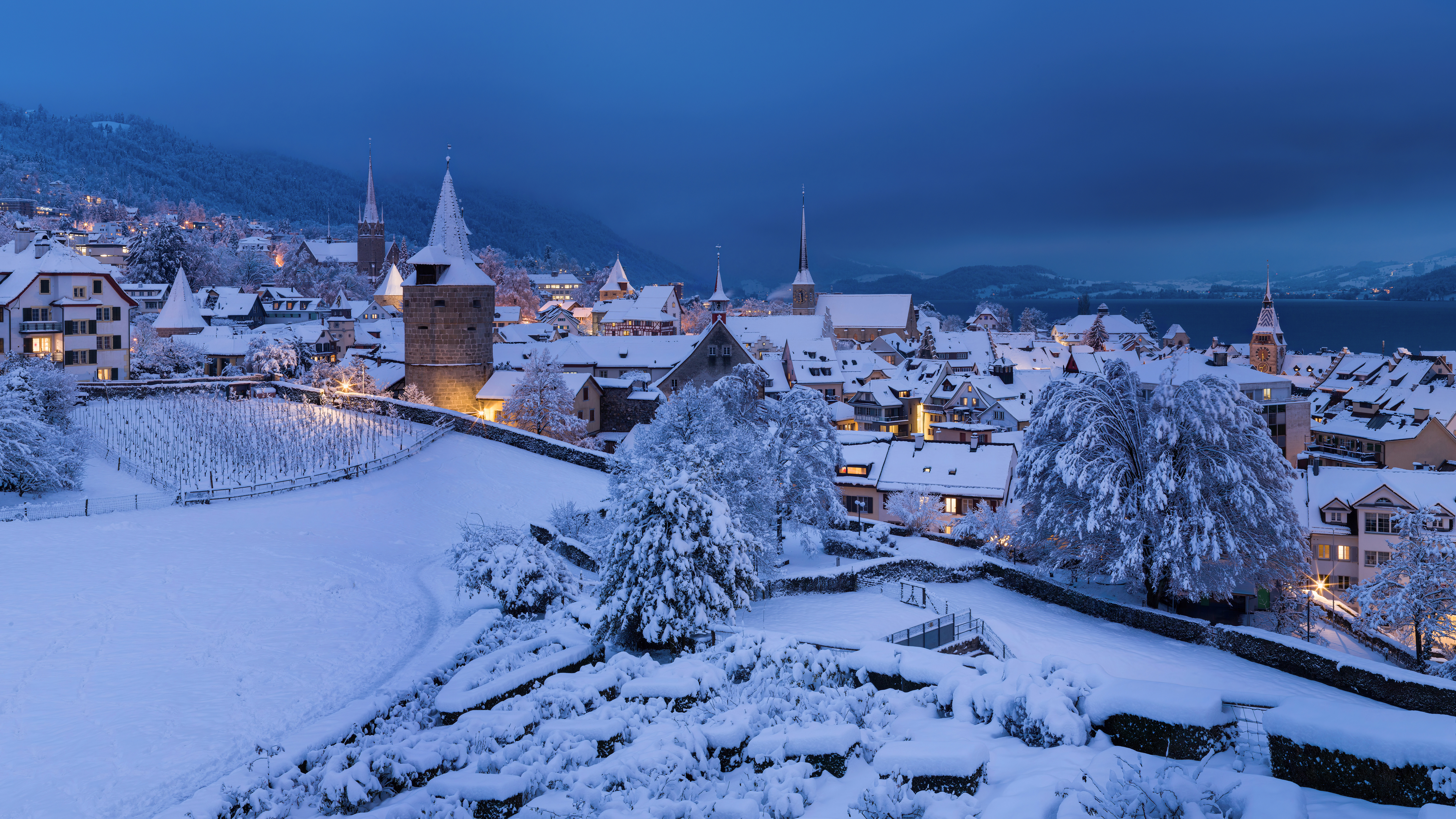
Zug, Switzerland during the blue hour

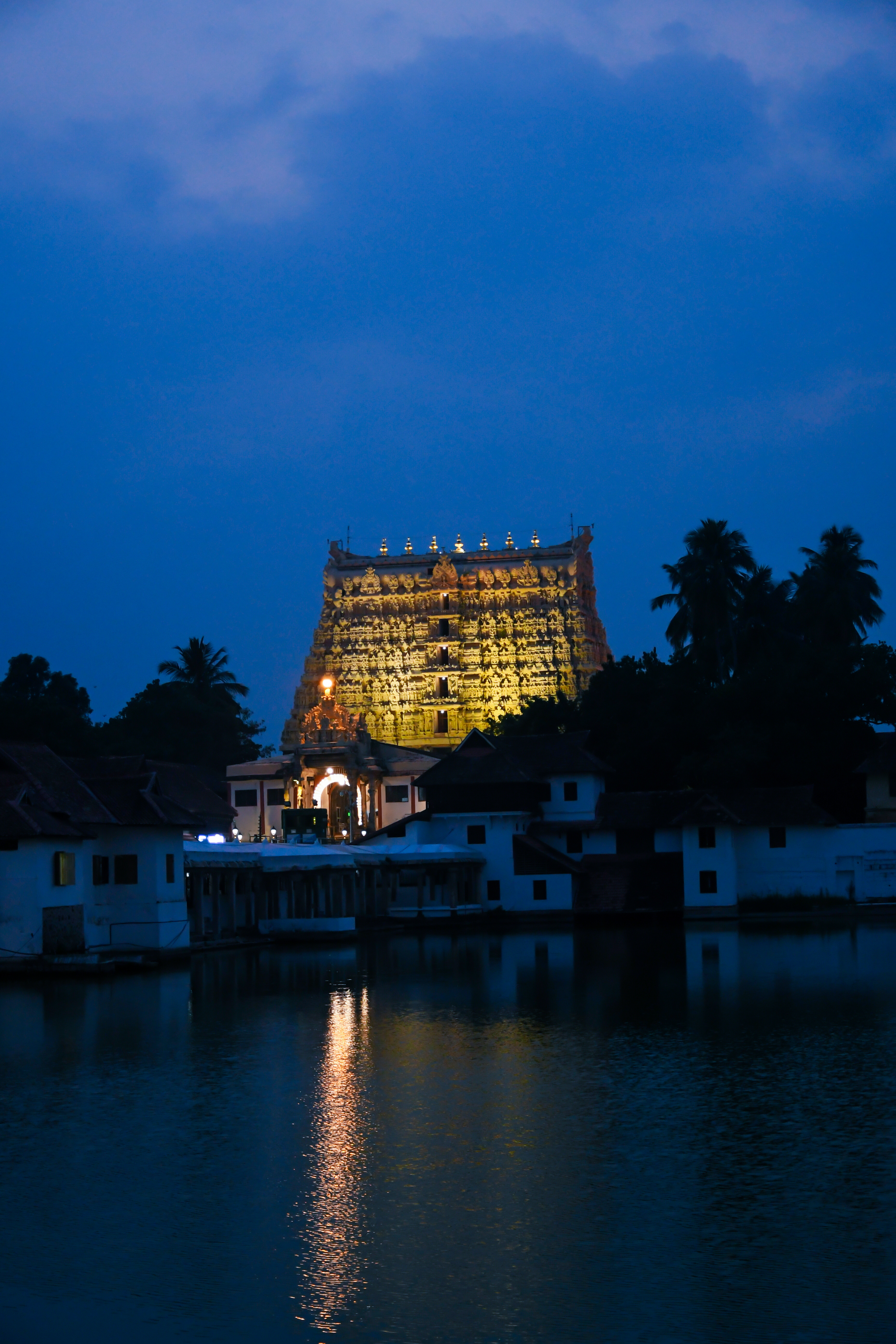
Padmanabhaswami Temple of Kerala during the blue hour

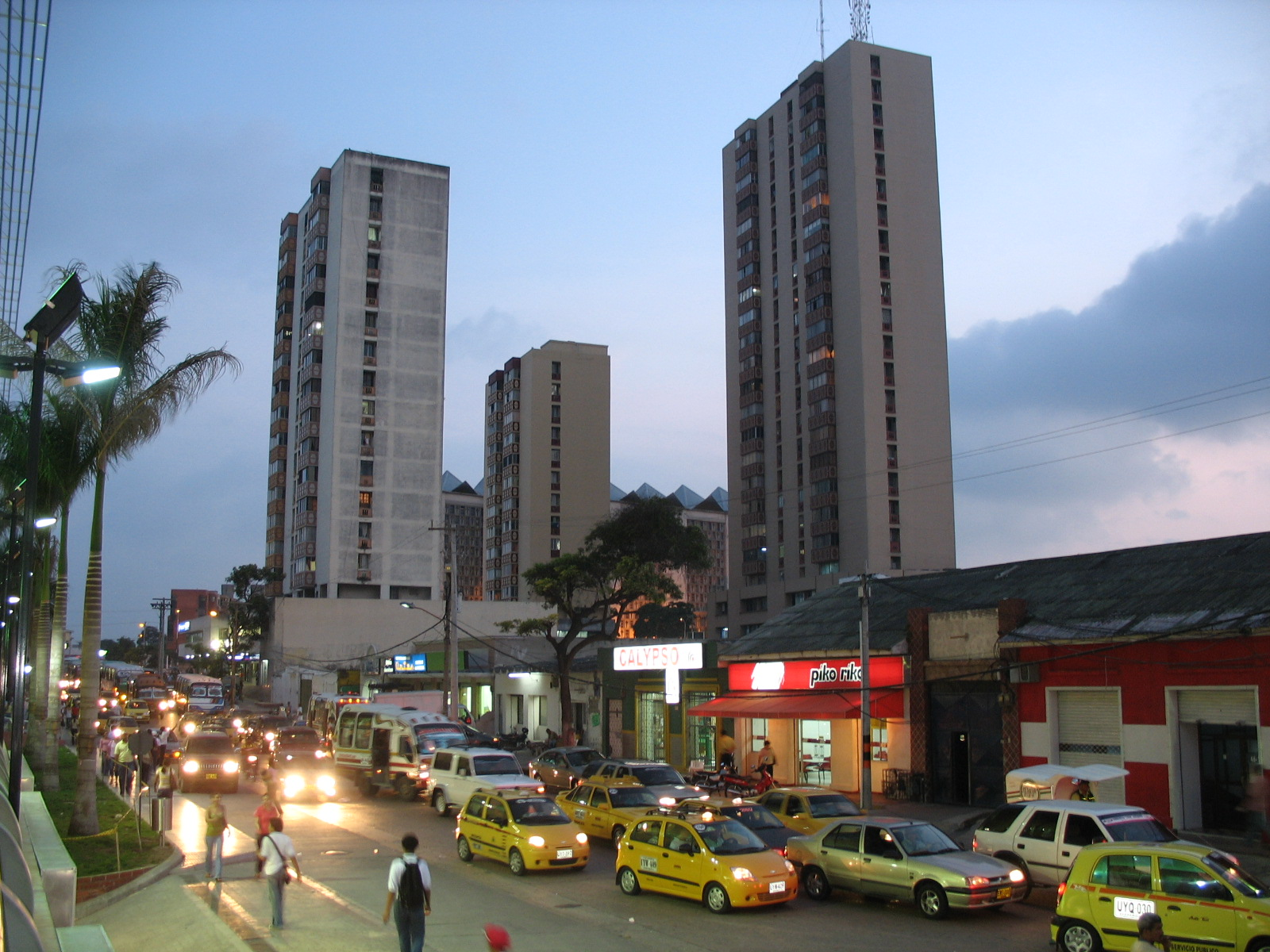
Barranquilla, Colombia, during the blue hour

== See also ==
- Color temperature
- Green flash
- Golden hour (photography)
- Bramamuhurta
- Waking up early
