= Chappuis absorption =

Absorption of electromagnetic radiation by ozone

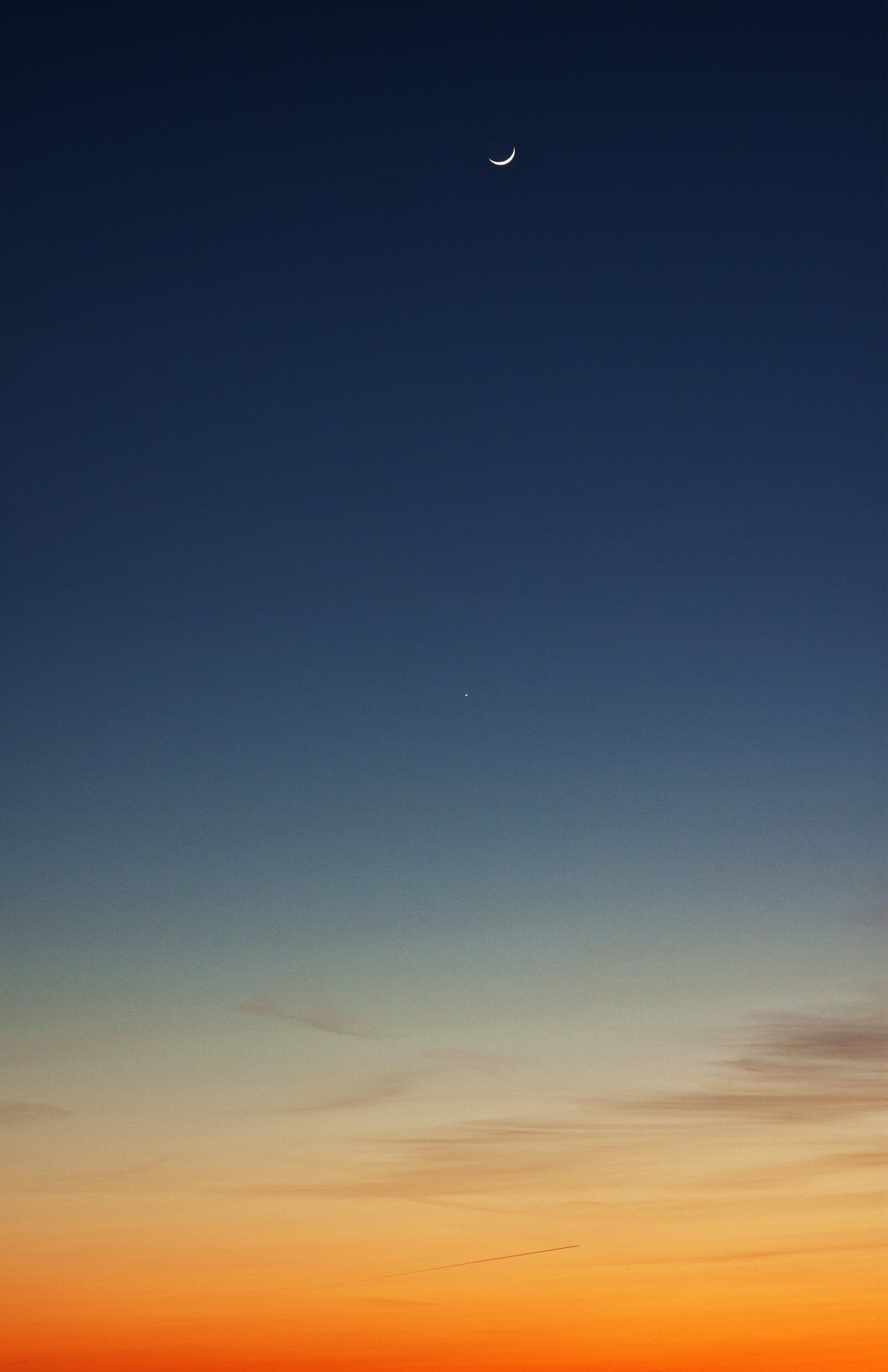
The western twilight sky after sunset, during the blue hour (around nautical dusk). The deep-blue color of the upper portion is attributable to Chappuis absorption.

Chappuis absorption (French: [ʃapɥi]) refers to the absorption of electromagnetic radiation by ozone, which is especially noticeable in the ozone layer, which absorbs a small part of sunlight in the visible portion of the electromagnetic spectrum. The Chappuis absorption bands occur at wavelengths between 400 and 650 nm. Within this range are two absorption maxima of similar height at 575 and 603 nm.

Compared to the absorption of ultraviolet light by the ozone layer, known as the Hartley and Huggins absorptions, Chappuis absorption is distinctly weaker. Along with Rayleigh scattering, it contributes to the blue color of the sky, and is noticeable when the light has to travel a long path through the Earth's atmosphere. For this reason, Chappuis absorption only has a significant effect on the color of the sky at dawn and dusk, during the so-called blue hour. It is named after the French chemist James Chappuis (1854–1934), who discovered this effect.

== History ==
James Chappuis was the first researcher (in 1880) to notice that light passing through ozone gas has a blue tint. He attributed this effect to absorption in the yellow, orange, and red parts of the light spectrum. The French chemist Auguste Houzeau had already shown in 1858 that the atmosphere contains traces of ozone, so Chappuis presumed that ozone could explain the blue color of the sky. He was certainly aware that this was not the only possible explanation, since the blue light that can be seen from Earth's surface is polarised. Polarization cannot be explained by light absorption by ozone, but can be explained by Rayleigh scattering, which was already known by Chappuis's time. Contemporary scientists thought that Rayleigh scattering was sufficient to explain the blue sky, and so the idea that ozone could play a role was eventually forgotten.

In the early 1950s, Edward Hulburt was conducting research on the sky at dusk, to verify theoretical predictions on the temperature and density of the upper atmosphere on the basis of scattered light measured at the Earth's surface. The basic idea was that after the Sun passes under the horizon, it continues to illuminate the upper layers of the atmosphere. Hulburt wished to relate the intensity of light reaching the Earth's surface through Rayleigh scattering to the abundance of particles at each altitude, as the sunlight passes through the atmosphere at different heights over the course of sunset. In his measurements, performed in 1952 at Sacramento Peak in New Mexico, he found that the intensity of measured light was lower by a factor of 2 to 4 than the predicted value. His predictions were based on his theory, and on measurements that were made in the upper atmosphere only a few years before by rocket flights launched not far from Sacramento Peak. The magnitude of the deviation between prediction and photometric measurements made on Sacramento Peak precluded mere measurement error. Until then, theory had predicted that the sky at the zenith during sundown should appear blue-green to grey, and the color should shift to yellow during dusk. This was obviously in conflict with daily observation that the blue color of the sky in the zenith at dusk changes only imperceptibly. As Hulburt knew about the absorption by ozone, and as the spectral range of Chappuis absorption had been more precisely measured only a few years before by the French couple Arlette and Étienne Vassy, he made an attempt to account for this effect in his calculations. This brought the measurements completely into agreement with the theoretical predictions. The results of Hulburt were repeatedly confirmed in the following years. Indeed, not all color effects at dusk in clear sky can be explained by the deeper layers. To this end it is probably necessary to account for spectral extinction by aerosols in theoretical simulations.

Independently of Hulburt, the French meteorologist Jean Dubois had proposed a few years before that Chappuis absorption had an effect on another color phenomenon of the sky at dusk. Dubois worked on the so-called "Earth's shadow" in his doctoral thesis in the 1940s, and he hypothesized that this effect could also be attributed to Chappuis absorption. However, this conjecture is not supported by more recent measurements.

== Physical basis ==
Chappuis absorption is a continuum absorption in the wavelength range between 400 and 650 nm. It is caused by the photodissociation (breaking-apart) of the ozone molecule. The absorption maximum lies around 603 nm, with a cross-section of 5.23 10^{−21} cm^{2}. A second, somewhat smaller maximum at ca. 575 nm has a cross-section of 4.83 10^{−21} cm^{2}. The absorbance energy in the Chappuis bands lies between 1.8 and 3.1 eV. The measured values imply that absorption mechanism is barely temperature-dependent; the deviation accounts for less than three percent. Around its maxima, Chappuis absorption is about three orders of magnitude weaker than the absorption of ultraviolet light in the range of the Hartley bands. Indeed, the Chappuis absorption is one of the few noteworthy absorption processes within the visible spectrum in Earth's atmosphere.

Overlaid on the absorption spectrum of the Chappuis bands at shorter wavelengths are partly irregular and diffuse bands caused by molecular vibrations. The irregularity of these bands implies that the ozone molecule is only for an extremely short time in an excited state before it dissociates. During this short excitation it is mostly undergoing symmetrical stretching vibrations, although with some contributions from bending vibrations. A consistent theoretical explanation of the vibration structure that is in line with the experimental data was for a long time an unsolved problem; even today, not all details of the Chappuis absorption can be explained by theory.

Like when it absorbs ultraviolet light, the ozone molecule can decompose into an O_{2} molecule and an O atom during Chappuis absorption. Unlike the Hartley and Huggins absorptions, however, the decomposition products do not remain in an excited state. Dissociation in the Chappuis bands is the most important photochemical process involving ozone in the Earth's atmosphere below an altitude of 30 km. Over this altitude, it is outweighed by absorptions in the Hartley band. However, neither the Hartley nor the Chappuis absorptions cause significant loss of ozone in the stratosphere, despite the high potential photodissociation rate, because the elemental oxygen has a high probability of encountering an O_{2} molecule and recombining back into ozone.
