= Edmund Tull =

Hungarian artist

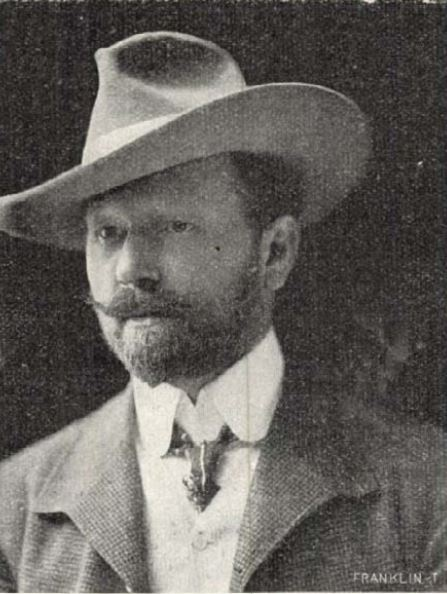
Tull Ödön

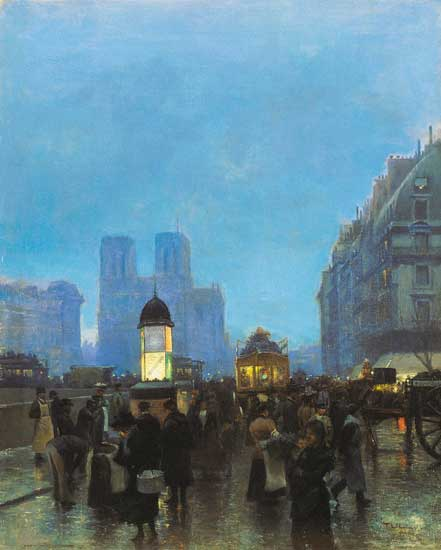
Twilight, Paris, 1897

Edmund Tull (1870–1911), also known as Ödön Tull, was a Hungarian artist born at Székesfehérvár. He was educated at Budapest, Milan, and Paris, being in the last-named city a pupil of J. P. Laurens and of B. Constant. His first work, "The Cathedral of Notre Dame," attracted attention at the exposition in Budapest in 1896, while his etchings are especially valued in London and Vienna. His best-known works are: "Peasant Mowing," "A Lane in Dort," and "The Island of Capri," in the historical art museum of Budapest; and "The Smithy," owned by Archduchess Isabella.
