= William W. Havens Jr. =

American physicist

- Born: March 31, 1920
- Died: June 29, 2004 (aged 84); New York City
- Education: City College of New York; Columbia University
- Scientific career
- Workplaces: Manhattan Project; Columbia University
- Thesis: Slow neutron cross sections of indium, gold, silver, antimony, lithium and mercury as measured with a neutron beam spectrometer (1946)
- Doctoral advisor: John R. Dunning
- Doctoral students: Martin M. Block; Lillian C. McDermott

William Westerfield Havens Jr. (March 31, 1920 – June 29, 2004) was an American physicist.

A graduate of City College of New York and Columbia University, Havens worked with James Rainwater on the construction of a neutron spectrometer, which became the subject of his doctoral thesis. During World War II he worked on the Manhattan Project, the effort to create the first atomic bombs, in its Substitute Alloy Materials (SAM) Laboratories.

Havens was awarded his doctorate in 1946 after his thesis was declassified. He spent the rest of his career at Columbia University, where he became a full professor in 1955, and was its director of nuclear science and engineering from 1961 to 1977. He was part of the US delegation at the United Nations Atoms for Peace Conferences in Geneva in July and August 1955 and in September 1958, and became a consultant at the Los Alamos National Laboratory in 1962. He retired from Columbia in 1985, and from then until 1990 was the first full-time CEO of the American Physical Society.

== Early life ==
Havens was born in the Bronx on March 31, 1920, the son of William Havens Sr., a civil engineer, and Elsie S. Nedle, a schoolteacher. He had an older sister, Marjorie, who became a lawyer. He was a descendant of Jonathan Nicoll Havens, a politician who served in the United States Congress from 1795 to 1799. He was educated at Evander Childs High School, from which he graduated in 1935 at the age of 15. His father wanted him to enter Columbia University, his own alma mater, but Columbia would not accept him on account of his age. He therefore entered the City College of New York, which he attended on a scholarship. While there he was on the swimming team, and served in the ROTC, reaching the rank of cadet captain. During the summer of 1938 he was a lifeguard at the ROTC camp. The following year he worked as a lifeguard at Jones Beach Island. He graduated with his Bachelor of Arts degree in 1939, majoring in mathematics and chemistry.

In 1939, Havens entered Columbia University, where he studied physics, taking classes on mechanics with George B. Pegram, atomic physics with Isidor Isaac Rabi and electromagnetism with Shirley L. Quimby. He was awarded his Master of Arts degree in 1941. He then began working on his doctorate under the supervision of John R. Dunning. Fellow graduate students in physics at the time included James Rainwater, Herbert L. Anderson and George Weil. He worked with Rainwater on the construction of a neutron spectrometer. His thesis, on "Slow neutron cross sections of indium, gold, silver, antimony, lithium and mercury as measured with a neutron beam spectrometer", was classified.

== Manhattan Project ==
The physics faculty at Columbia were drawn into what became the Manhattan Project, the effort to create the first atomic bombs, which accelerated after the United States entered World War II in December 1941. Fermi and Anderson carried out studies of neutrons emitted by fission, while Dunning began investigating isotope separation. Havens and Rainwater attempted to measure the time it took for fission to occur. That found it was less than a microsecond, which was the smallest time that they could measure. They analyzed samples of uranium that Robert R. Wilson's team at Princeton University had attempted to separate the isotopes using a device called the "isotron". They reported that the degree of enrichment was slight, and the process was eventually abandoned. Wilson's group was transferred to the Los Alamos Laboratory.

Fermi's reactor group also left Columbia, as Arthur Compton consolidated the Manhattan Project's reactor project at the Metallurgical Laboratory. Those that remained at Columbia became the Substitute Alloy Materials (SAM) Laboratories, under the direction of Harold Urey, which was mainly concerned with isotope separation for uranium enrichment. Havens and Rainwater also devised a means of measuring residual hydrogen in fluorocarbons, a subject of great interest because uranium hexafluoride gas was being considered for use in isotope separation processes. Havens, Rainwater and Chien-Shiung Wu worked on the development of radiation detector instrumentation, and studies of neutron cross sections using the neutron spectrometer. This included work with plutonium. After the war ended in August 1945, a dozen papers by Dunning, Havens, Rainwater and Wu would be declassified and published. This included his PhD thesis, and he was awarded his doctorate after it was published, along with Rainwater's, in the Physical Review in 1946.

== Later life ==
Havens spent the rest of his career at Columbia University, where he became a full professor in 1955, and was its director of nuclear science and engineering from 1961 to 1977. In the immediate post-war period, Columbia built a powerful 400 MeV synchrotron, which became operational in 1950, at the Nevis Laboratories, on an estate on the Hudson River at Irvington, New York, willed to Columbia University by the DuPont family. To learn about cyclotrons, Havens spent some time with Emilio Segrè's group at the University of California, Berkeley. Havens used the Nevis synchrotron to produce neutrons as part of an Atomic Energy Commission project to see if plutonium could be produced without a nuclear reactor, as it was believed at the time that uranium was scarce. The project eventually evolved into the Materials Test Accelerator at the Lawrence Livermore Laboratory; but it never served its intended purpose, as uranium was found to not be a scarce as first thought.

From 1948 until the 1970s, Havens served with the AEC Neutron Cross-sections Advisory Group. This led to his being a part of the US delegation at the United Nations Atoms for Peace Conferences in Geneva in July and August 1955 and in September 1958. Havens pressed the AEC to release more information on neutron cross-sections, but was thwarted by its chairman, Lewis Strauss, who explained, "We’ve got to keep something secret".

The work with neutrons led to Havens becoming a consultant (later called "visiting staff member") at Los Alamos in 1962. He would attend occasional meetings at Los Alamos during the academic year, and spend a couple of weeks there during the summer. At the time there was considerable interest in neutron weapons. In 1985, Havens retired from Columbia and became the first full-time CEO of the American Physical Society (APS), the largest professional physicists' body in the world. He retired from this in 1990. He oversaw the APS a period of considerable growth, and worked with Vera Kistiakowsky to promote the role of women in science.

Havens died from complications related to leukaemia in Memorial Sloan-Kettering Hospital on June 29, 2004. He was survived by his wife Aldine, daughters Nancy and Cynthia, and sister, Marjorie.
