= James Rainwater =

American physicist

Leo James Rainwater
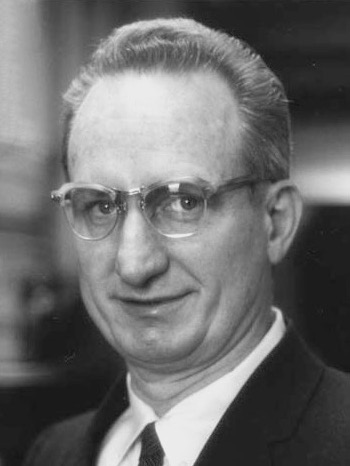
- Rainwater in 1975
- Born: December 9, 1917; Council, Idaho, U.S.
- Died: May 31, 1986 (aged 68); New York City, U.S.
- Education: California Institute of Technology (BA); Columbia University (MA, PhD)
- Awards: Ernest Orlando Lawrence Award (1963); Nobel Prize in Physics (1975)
- Scientific career
- Institutions: Columbia University; Manhattan Project
- Thesis: Neutron beam spectrometer studies of boron, cadmium, and the energy distribution from paraffin (1946)
- Doctoral advisor: John R. Dunning

Leo James Rainwater (December 9, 1917 – May 31, 1986) was an American physicist who shared the Nobel Prize in Physics in 1975 for his part in determining the asymmetrical shapes of certain atomic nuclei.

During World War II, he worked on the Manhattan Project that developed the first atomic bombs. In 1949, he began developing his theory that, contrary to what was then believed, not all atomic nuclei are spherical. His ideas were later tested and confirmed by Aage Bohr's and Ben Mottelson's experiments. He also contributed to the scientific understanding of X-rays and participated in the United States Atomic Energy Commission and naval research projects.

Rainwater joined the physics faculty at Columbia in 1946, where he reached the rank of full professor in 1952 and was named Pupin Professor of Physics in 1982. He received the Ernest Orlando Lawrence Award for Physics in 1963 and in 1975 was awarded the Nobel Prize in Physics, "for the discovery of the connection between collective motion and particle motion in atomic nuclei and the development of the theory of the structure of the atomic nucleus based on this connection".

== Early life ==
Leo James Rainwater was born on December 9, 1917, in Council, Idaho, the son of a former civil engineer who ran the local general store, Leo Jaspar Rainwater and his wife Edna Eliza née Teague. He never used his first name and was always referred to as James or Jim. His father died in the great influenza epidemic of 1918 and Rainwater and his mother moved to Hanford, California, where she married George Fowler, a widower with two sons, Freeman and John. In time he also acquired a half-brother, George Fowler Jr., who became naval officer. At high school he excelled in mathematics, chemistry and physics and was admitted to the California Institute of Technology on the strength of a chemistry competition. He received his Bachelor of Science degree as a physics major in 1939.

== Manhattan Project ==
Rainwater then chose to undertake postgraduate studies at Columbia University. At the time this was an unusual move for a scholar from California, as Columbia was not then renowned for its physics; but this had recently changed. George B. Pegram had recently built up the physics department, and hired scientists like Enrico Fermi. At Columbia Rainwater studied under Isidor Isaac Rabi, Enrico Fermi, Edward Teller and John R. Dunning. Fermi was engaged in neutron moderator studies that would lead to the construction of the first nuclear reactor, while Dunning and Eugene T. Booth had built Columbia's first cyclotron, in the basement of the Pupin Physics Laboratories. Rainwater received his Master of Arts in 1941. For his Doctor of Philosophy thesis on "Neutron beam spectrometer studies of boron, cadmium, and the energy distribution from paraffin", written under Dunning's supervision, he built a neutron spectrometer and developed techniques for its use. Rainwater married Emma Louise Smith in March 1942. They had three sons, James, Robert and William and a daughter, Elizabeth Ann, who died from leukaemia when she was nine.

Fermi's reactor group moved to the Metallurgical Laboratory at the University of Chicago in 1942. Rainwater remained at Columbia, where he joined the Manhattan Project's Substitute Alloy Materials (SAM) Laboratories. The Manhattan Project was the Allied effort during World War II to develop atomic bombs. The SAM Laboratories' primary task was the development of gaseous diffusion technology for uranium enrichment, to produce fissile uranium-235 for use in atomic bombs. Rainwater worked with William W. Havens Jr. and Chien-Shiung Wu, mostly on studies of neutron cross sections, using the neutron spectrometer. After the war, a dozen papers by Dunning, Havens, Rainwater and Wu would be declassified and published. So too was his thesis, published in the Physical Review in two parts with Havens's thesis, and he was awarded his doctorate in 1946. In 1963 he was awarded the United States Atomic Energy Commission's Ernest Orlando Lawrence Award, for his work on the Manhattan Project.

== Later life ==
Rainwater remained at Columbia as an instructor. In 1948, he began teaching courses on nuclear structure. Niels Bohr and John Wheeler had developed a theoretical treatment for nuclear fission in 1939 that they based on the liquid drop model of the nucleus. This was superseded in 1949 by Maria Goeppert Mayer's nuclear shell model, which could explain more about the structure of heavy elements than the older theory but it still had limits. At a colloquium at Columbia in 1949, Charles H. Townes reported experimental results that indicated quadrupole moments greater than those indicated by the shell model. It occurred to Rainwater that this could be explained and the differences between the liquid drop and nuclear shell models could be reconciled, if the atomic nucleus were not spherical, as had been assumed but could assume other shapes. Rainwater published his theoretical paper in 1950. By chance, that year he was sharing an office with Aage Bohr, who had independently come to a similar idea. Bohr and Ben Mottelson published their results in three papers in 1952 and 1953 that demonstrated convincing agreement with available data. Rainwater felt that his model was overlooked. He later recalled that:

When I made my proposal for use of a spheroidal nuclear model, it seemed to be an obvious answer which would immediately be simultaneously suggested by all theorists in the field. I do not understand why it was not. I was also surprised and dismayed to hear one or more respected theorists announce in every Nuclear Physics Conference which I attended through 1955 some such comment as, "Although the Nuclear Shell Model seems empirically to work very well, there is at present no theoretical justification as to why it should apply."

With funding from the Office of Naval Research, Rainwater built a synchrocyclotron, which became operational in 1950, at the Nevis Laboratories, on an estate on the Hudson River at Irvington, New York, willed to Columbia University by the DuPont family. He became a full professor in 1952 and was the director of Nevis Laboratories from 1951 to 1954 and again from 1957 to 1961. He worked with his student Val Fitch on studies of muonic atoms, atoms where an electron is replaced by a muon. After 1965, he worked on turning the Nevis synchrocyclotron into a meson facility. When a reporter rang in 1975 to inform him that he had won the Nobel Prize in Physics, he initially thought that it was for his work on muonic atoms. Several hours passed before he discovered that it was for his work on nuclear structure, the Nobel Prize being shared with Bohr and Mottelson.

He was a fellow of the American Physical Society, the New York Academy of Sciences and the Institute of Electrical and Electronics Engineers, and was a member of the National Academy of Sciences, the American Institute of Physics, the American Association of Physics Teachers and the Optical Society of America.

Rainwater succeeded Robert R. Wilson as Michael I. Pupin Professor of Physics in 1983.

Rainwater collapsed after a lecture at the Pupin Laboratories in 1985 but was revived by a student who knew how to administer CPR. In declining health, he retired and became a professor emeritus in February 1986. He died from cardiopulmonary arrest at St. John's Riverside Hospital in Yonkers, New York on May 31, 1986. He was survived by his wife, three sons and half-brother George.
