= Laura McCullough (physicist) =

American physics educator

Laura Ellen McCullough (born 1954) is an American physics educator, and a professor in the Chemistry & Physics Department at the University of Wisconsin–Stout. She is known for her work on women in physics.

== Education and career ==
As a high school student, McCullough already intended to become a physics professor. She majored in physics at Hamline University in Saint Paul, Minnesota, graduating magna cum laude in 1994. She continued her studies in physics at the University of Minnesota, receiving a master's degree in 1997 and completing a Ph.D. in physics education in 2000. Her dissertation, The Effect of Introducing Computers into an Introductory Physics Problem-Solving Laboratory, was supervised by Patricia Heller.

She joined the University of Wisconsin–Stout as an assistant professor of physics in 2000, and was promoted to associate professor in 2004. In 2010 she became a full professor. She chaired the university's physics department from 2008 to 2014.

== Book ==
McCullough is the author of the book Women and Physics (IOP Publishing 2016; 2nd ed., 2024).

== Recognition ==
McCullough was the 2019 recipient of the Homer L. Dodge Citation for Distinguished Service of the American Association of Physics Teachers. In 2022, she received the Teaching Excellence Award of the University of Wisconsin System, the first professor at the University of Wisconsin–Stout to receive this award.

She was named as a Fellow of the American Association of Physics Teachers in 2022. In 2025, she was named as a Fellow of the American Physical Society (APS), after a nomination from the APS Forum on Diversity and Inclusion, "for sustained, significant, and impactful research on and service towards promoting gender equity in physics".
