= Martin M. Block =

American physicist (1925–2016)

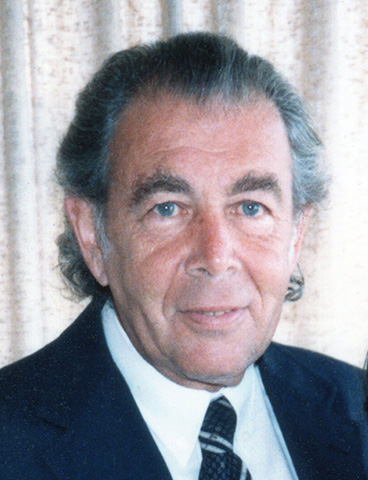
- Martin Block in August 1985
- Born: 29 November 1925; Newark, New Jersey
- Died: 22 July 2016 (age 90); Los Angeles, California
- Education: Columbia University
- Scientific career
- Workplaces: Duke University; Northwestern University

Martin Moses Block (November 29, 1925 – July 22, 2016) was an American physicist, known as a co-discoverer with Aihud Pevsner of the eta meson in 1961.

== Biography ==
Block was born in Newark, New Jersey. He graduated from Columbia University in 1947 with B.S., in 1948 with M.A., and in 1952 with Ph.D. supervised by William W. Havens Jr. At Columbia, Block helped to design the magnets for the Nevis cyclotron. In 1949 he married Beate Sondheim. He joined the faculty of Duke University in 1951. He attended the University of Rochester's 6th Annual Conference on High Energy Nuclear Physics, where he contributed a paper and roomed with Richard Feynman. Block suggested to Feynman that parity is not conserved in weak interactions, and Feynman raised the question with the other experts. At Duke University, Block led the team that developed the world's first liquid-helium bubble chamber, which was used for study of several newly discovered particles. In 1961 he left Duke University for Northwestern University, where he remained on the faculty until he retired as professor emeritus in 1996. At Northwestern University, he did research on large spectrometer counter and spark chamber systems. In the early 1960s he did research at Giampietro Puppi's lab. At CERN in 1964–1965, as a Ford Foundation Fellow, a NATO Fellow, and a UNESCO Fellow, Block was part of a team that was the first to use a heavy liquid chamber to measure neutrino interactions. His experimental team was the first to measure the relative parity of two strange particles, demonstrating that the Λ^{0}-K^{0} parity is odd. In 1972–1973 he was a NATO Fellow in Giuseppe Cocconi's lab at CERN.

He codiscovered the eta meson, and he probed particles at ever-higher energies by using heavy-liquid bubble chambers and, eventually, modern counter detectors. His work took him to accelerators all over the world, with extended stints at Fermilab, CERN, and Lawrence Berkeley, Brookhaven, and Argonne National Laboratories. Block’s lifelong passion for the mountains, especially for downhill skiing and fly-fishing, eventually took him to Aspen, where he joined the Aspen Center for Physics in its nascent years. He purchased a family home there in 1964, and he spent many vacations in Aspen until he left Northwestern to spend full time in Colorado.

After 1964, during summers and winters, Martin and Beate Block were in Aspen, in Geneva, Switzerland where Martin worked at the CERN particle accelerator, or in Evanston, Illinois where he taught and did research. In 1985, Martin Block started the first Aspen Winter Physics Conference with Beate Block in charge of logistical planning, lodging, events and entertainment. As the conferences grew larger, she left all of the planning to professional staff.

After moving to Aspen with his wife, Block did research in theoretical and computational physics.

A central focus of his later work was on the forward-scattering amplitudes of hadron collisions, particularly at the highest energies available at the most powerful modern accelerators as well as from cosmic rays. He sought to understand scattering structure and, specifically, why the proton–proton interaction cross section grows with the square of the logarithm of the energy.

Block died on July 22, 2016, in Los Angeles, California. Upon his death he was survived by his widow, a son Steven Block, a daughter, and two grandchildren.

== Awards and honors ==
- 1958 — Guggenheim Fellowship for the academic year 1958–1959
- 1960 — elected a Fellow of the American Physical Society
- 1985 — Medal of the Italian Physical Society
- 1985 — symposium on weak interactions in honor of Martin M. Block at the University of Pavia
- 1996 — symposium honoring Block's 45-year career in physics, "BlockParty" at Northwestern University
- 2003 — elected a Foreign Corresponding Member of the Italian Academy of Sciences
