= Etkin =

Etkin (Hebrew: אטקין; Slavic feminine: Etkina) is a matronymic surname of Ashkenazi Jewish origin. It derives from Etke, a Yiddish pet form of Esther. Notable people with the surname include:

- Bernard Etkin (1918–2014), Canadian engineering academic, expert in the fields of aeronautics and astronautics
- Efron Etkin (1952–2012), Israeli actor and voice actor
- Eugenia Etkina, 20th and 21st century Russian and American scholar of physics education
- Hanoch Etkin; Russian: Хенох Эткин (1863–1937), Rabbi of Luga (1895-1924) and Leningrad (1924-1937)
- Mariano Etkin (1943–2016), Argentine composer
- Nina Etkin (1948–2009), American anthropologist and biologist
- Oran Etkin (born 1979), Israeli-born American jazz and world music musician
- Róża Etkin-Moszkowska (1908–1945), née Etkin, Polish pianist

== See also ==
- Etkind, a surname
