= Rachel Scherr =

American physics educator

Rachel E. Scherr is an American physics educator, currently an associate professor of physics at the University of Washington Bothell. Her research includes studies of responsive teaching and active learning, video and gestural analysis of classroom behavior, and student understanding of energy and special relativity.

== Education and career ==
In high school, Scherr worked as an "explainer" at the Exploratorium in San Francisco. She majored in physics at Reed College, where she used the support of a Watson Fellowship for a year abroad studying physics education in Europe, Asia, and Africa. After graduating in 1993 she went to the University of Washington for graduate study in physics and physics education, earning a master's degree in 1996 and completing her Ph.D. in 2001. Her dissertation, An investigation of student understanding of basic concepts in special relativity, was jointly supervised by Lillian C. McDermott and Stamatis Vokos.

After a short-term stint at Evergreen State College, she became a postdoctoral researcher and research assistant professor at the University of Maryland from 2001 to 2010. She moved to Seattle Pacific University as a research scientist in 2008, and to her present position at the University of Washington Bothell in 2018.

She was chair of the Topical Group on Physics Education Research of the American Physical Society (APS) for the 2016 term.

== Recognition ==
Scherr was elected as a Fellow of the American Physical Society in 2017, after a nomination from the APS Topical Group on Physics Education Research, "for foundational research into energy learning and representations, application of video analysis methods to study physics classrooms, and physics education research community leadership".
