= Stephanie Chasteen =

American physics educator (1972–2024)

Stephanie Viola Chasteen (March 25, 1972 – November 3, 2024) was an American physics education researcher and science communicator, known on social media as "sciencegeekgirl".

== Life and work ==
Chasteen was born on March 25, 1972, in Appleton, Wisconsin. She was educated at Oyster River High School in Durham, New Hampshire, and majored in social psychology at Bard College, graduating in 1995. After serving in the Peace Corps in Guinea, West Africa, she received a Ph.D. from the University of California, Santa Cruz, in 2005, specializing in condensed-matter physics. During her graduate studies, with the support of a fellowship from the American Association for the Advancement of Science, she also interned as a science news reporter at NPR.

After postdoctoral work at the Exploratorium in San Francisco, from 2005 to 2007, she worked for the University of Colorado Boulder Science Education Initiative for over ten years, beginning in 2007. She also worked as a lecturer in physics beginning in 2012. Following this, she became an independent consultant in physics education, remaining active in external evaluation of physics programs.

Chasteen died on November 3, 2024, after a year-long struggle with glioblastoma, a form of brain cancer. She was 52.

== Recognition ==
Chasteen was the 2024 recipient of the Lillian McDermott Medal of the American Association of Physics Teachers, and was named a Fellow of the American Association of Physics Teachers in 2024.

Chasteen was posthumously named a Fellow of the American Physical Society (APS) in 2024, after a nomination from the APS Topical Group on Physics Education Research, "for significant contributions to physics education research, including groundbreaking work on departmental change, teaching upper-division courses, evaluating and supporting numerous research projects and dissemination programs, and outstanding service to the APS Topical Group on Physics Education Research".
