= RARAF =

Biotechnology research center in Irvington, New York, U.S.

- Established: 1984 (at its current location)
- Research type: Radiobiology
- Field of research: Microbeam
- Director: David J. Brenner
- Location: P.O. Box 21, Irvington, New York
- Affiliations: Columbia University; National Institutes of Health; National Institute of Biomedical Imaging and Bioengineering
- Website: www.raraf.org

The Radiological Research Accelerator Facility (RARAF), located on the Columbia University Nevis Laboratories campus in Irvington, New York is a National Institute of Biomedical Imaging and Bioengineering biotechnology resource center (P41) specializing in microbeam technology. The facility is currently built around a 5MV Singletron, a particle accelerator similar to a Van de Graaff.

The RARAF microbeam can produce with high accuracy and precision:

- 70-120 keV/μm alpha particles
- 8-25 keV/μm protons
- 0.6 μm diameter focused beam spot
- 10,000 cells/hour throughput

== History ==
RARAF was conceived by Victor P. Bond and Harald H. Rossi in the late 1960s . Their aim was to provide a source of monoenergetic neutrons designed and operated specifically for studies in radiation biology, dosimetry, and microdosimetry. The facility was built around the 4 MV Van de Graaff particle accelerator that originally served as the injector for the Cosmotron, a 2 GeV accelerator operated at Brookhaven National Laboratory (BNL) in the 1950s and 1960s.

RARAF operated at BNL from 1967 until 1980, when it was dismantled to make room for the ISABELLE project, a very large accelerator which was never completed. A new site for RARAF was found at the Nevis Laboratories of Columbia University where its cyclotron was being disassembled. The U.S. Department of Energy provided funds to move RARAF to Nevis Laboratories and reassemble it in a new multi-level facility constructed within the cyclotron building. The new RARAF has been routinely operating for research since mid-1984.

RARAF was one of the first three microbeam facilities to be built, and it is the only original microbeam facility still in operation.

In 2006 the Van de Graaff was replaced by a 5 MV Singletron from High Voltage Engineering Europa (HVEE) in the Netherlands.

== Microbeam Development ==
As an NIBIB biotechnology resource center, RARAF is dedicated to developing and improving microbeam technologies. Developments focus on adding and improving imaging techniques to the existing microbeam. Neutron and x-ray microbeams are also in development. Some examples of microbeam developments are listed below.

=== Microbeam lens ===
In order to focus charged particles in the RARAF microbeam, an electrostatic lens consisting of six quadrupole arranged in two triplets with each successive quadrupole rotated by 90° around its axis, is used. Each quadrupole triplet consists of 4 ceramic rods on which gold electrodes were plated. This design ensures alignment of the three quadrupoles in the triplet and allows a small pole-gap and better focusing properties.

=== Subcellular targeting ===
Due to the nature of the RARAF microbeam, sub-cellular targets such as the cell nucleus or the cell cytoplasm have been possible for years. With a sub-micrometre diameter beam routinely available, additional targets within cellular systems are accessible. For instance, preliminary radiation experiments that target mitochondria have been conducted on small airway epithelial cells.

=== Point and shoot microbeam ===
During microbeam irradiation, cells to be irradiated are moved to the beam position using a high-speed high-resolution three-axis piezo-electric stage. In order to further reduce targeting time, and making use of the fact that a focused microbeam, unlike a collimated one, is not restricted to a single location on the accelerator exit window, we have implemented a magnetic-coil-based fast deflector, placed between the two quadrupole triplets, that allows deflecting the beam to any position in the field of view of the microscope used to observe the cells during irradiation. Moving the beam to the cell position magnetically can be performed much faster than moving the stage. The deflector used in this system can move the beam to as many as 1000 separate locations per second—more than 5 times the speed of movement of the stage—dramatically reducing the irradiation time.

=== X-ray microbeam ===
The RARAF microbeam is adding an x-ray microbeam using characteristic Kα x rays from Ti. The x rays will be generated using an electrostatic lens system to focus protons onto a thick Ti target. The x rays generated are demagnified using a zone plate. By using the already focused proton microbeam to generate characteristic x rays, it is possible to obtain a nearly monochromatic x-ray beam (very low bremsstrahlung yield) and a reasonably small x-ray source (~20 μm diameter), reducing the requirements on the zone plate.

There are considerable benefits in using soft x-ray microbeams for both mechanistic and risk estimation end-points. The higher spatial resolution achievable with modern state-of-the-art x-ray optics elements combined with the localized damage produced by the absorption of low energy photons (~1 keV) represents a unique tool to investigate the radio-sensitivity of sub-cellular and eventually sub-nuclear targets. Also, since low-energy x rays undergo very little scattering, by using x rays with an energy of ~5 keV it will be possible to irradiate with micrometre precision individual cells and/or parts of cells up to a few hundred micrometres deep inside a tissue sample in order to investigate the relevance of effects such as the bystander effect in 3-D structured cell systems.

== Microbeam experiments ==
RARAF is also a user facility for biologists interested in performing microbeam studies. The prominent theme of research undertaken using the RARAF microbeam is damage signal transduction, both within cells and between cells, which is of interest due in part to the discovery of the radiation-induced bystander effect. Early inter-cellular signal transduction studies were done with cells plated in 2D monolayers. More recently due to the significance of the extracellular environment and technological developments, studies involving 3D tissue systems, including living organisms, have become more common.

== Applications of Microfluidics ==
RARAF is developing various microfluidic devices which add to the irradiation capabilities of the facility. The precision control and manipulation of fluids and biological materials afforded by microfluidics are ideal to interface with the microbeam. Additional microfluidic systems beyond those listed here are currently under development.

=== Flow and Shoot ===
The Flow and Shoot microbeam system allows for controlled transport of cells through a microfluidic channel which intersects with the point and shoot microbeam. A high speed camera allows for dynamic targeting of the flowing cells with flow rates of 1–10 mm/s, allowing for total throughput upwards of 100,000 cells per hour.

=== Optofluidic Cell Manipulation ===
An optoelectronic tweezer platform has been interfaced with the RARAF microbeam. This allows precision manipulation of cell position before, during, and after irradiation.

=== Caenorhabditis elegans immobilization ===
RARAF has implemented a microfluidic platform for the immobilization of Caenorhabditis elegans during microbeam irradiation. The device avoids the use of anesthetics that might interfere with normal physiological processes by capturing the C. elegans worms in tapered microfluidic channels. It is possible to target specific regions of interest within C. elegans using this technology.

== Other Technologies ==
Broad beam irradiations are also possible. Particles with linear energy transfer (LET) between 10 and 200 keV/μm are available utilizing beams of protons, deuterons, helium-3, and helium-4 ions. Additionally, energetic and thermal neutrons and x rays can be used in broad beam irradiations.

== Training Scientists ==
RARAF has trained scientists at all levels: high school students, undergraduates, graduate students, post docs, and senior scientists. The lab estimates that about 45 scientists have received training in microbeam physics and or biology in the past 5 years.

RARAF is an active participant in the Columbia University Research Experience for Undergraduates program.

In addition, RARAF has become a de facto training center for developers of new microbeams. A virtual microbeam training course, complete with videos and handouts, is also available online.
