= Oyster River High School =

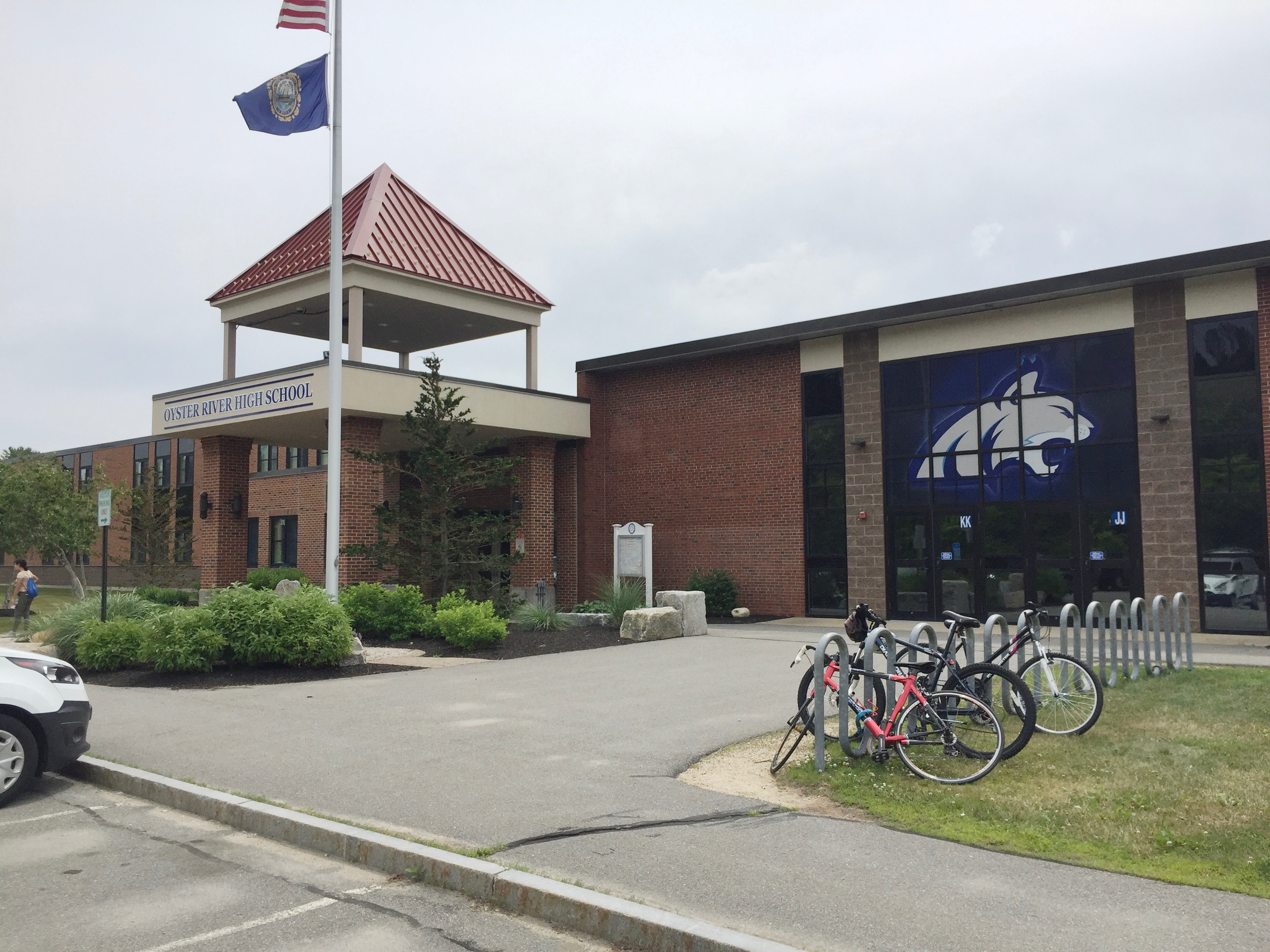

Location
- 55 Coe Drive; Durham, New Hampshire 03824; United States; 43°08′24″N 70°55′01″W

Information
- School type: Public high school
- Motto: "Working Together to Engage Every Learner"
- Founded: 1989
- School district: Oyster River Cooperative School District
- Superintendent: Robert Shaps (through June 30, 2026)
- CEEB code: 300150
- Principal: Rebecca Noe
- Grades: 9–12
- Enrollment: 794 (2017-2018)
- Language: English
- Colors: Royal Blue and White
- Athletics conference: NHIAA; Division II
- Mascot: Bobcat
- Rivals: Coe-Brown Northwood Academy
- Accreditation: NEASC
- Newspaper: Mouth of the River
- Communities served: Durham, Lee, and Madbury, NH
- Feeder schools: Oyster River Middle School
- Website: orhs.orcsd.org
- Last updated: December 31st, 2017

Oyster River High School (ORHS), part of the Oyster River Cooperative School District (ORCSD), is a public high school located in Durham, New Hampshire, United States, with an enrollment of nearly 800 students. It serves Durham and the neighboring communities of Lee, and Madbury. The high school opened, and the first graduating class was in 1956. The school yearbook is named Trion, named by Margaret Campbell in a school-wide contest. The high school moved to its present site on October 22, 1964.

In 2004 the school underwent a major renovation and expansion to its facilities, including a new gym, theater, classroom wing, and science wing, costing over $22 million.

== Academics ==
11th-grade students who take the NECAP standardized tests score an average of at or above the statewide scores in that year. In 2014, Newsweek ranked the school 110th in the nation.

== Athletics ==
Boys' soccer and girls' cross-country have each won several state championships.

The boys' soccer team won three consecutive state championships from 2001 to 2003, losing only 1 game in 2002 and going undefeated in 2003.

The girls' basketball team went undefeated in the 2005–2006 season to bring home a state championship and won the state championship in the 2008–2009 season. The boys' indoor track team won a state championship during the 2006–2007 season. The boys' and girls' swimming and diving teams have each captured multiple state championships. The boys' team captured five consecutive titles from 2007 to 2012. In the 2010 season, the girls' volleyball team went undefeated, winning the Division II state championship, and the boys' cross-country and indoor track teams won the newly created Division II championships. The boys' cross-country team won another state championship in 2011. In 2015, the boys' soccer team defeated Portsmouth High School to win the Division II championship.

The official school color is royal blue, also known as "Bobcat Blue" or "Oyster River Blue", but most of the teams wear white jerseys when playing at home games. However, unlike their fellow teams, the ice hockey team wears navy blue and red.

== Administration ==
The administration of ORHS is led by interim Principal Kristen Perron. Previously led by Rebecca Noe; Before that, led by Suzanne Filippone, who assumed the role before the 2016–17 school year and until 2021 when she was nominated Assistant Superintendent for ORCSD. For the previous three years, Filippone had been Assistant Principal at Spaulding High School in Rochester, New Hampshire, and was hired after the previous ORHS principal, Todd Allen, accepted the position of Assistant Superintendent of Oyster River Cooperative School District. She was also a teacher at Berwick Academy. The vice-principals of ORHS are Clay Cahoon and Mike McCann. The current superintendent of the school is Suzanne Filippone. Previously Dr. Robert Shaps was the superintendent, but resigned due to controversy about his actions in office.

== Notable alumni ==
- Stephanie Chasteen (1972–2024), physics education researcher and science communicator
- Jack Edwards, sportscaster and television commentator
- Ethan Gilsdorf, author of Fantasy Freaks and Gaming Geeks: An Epic Quest for Reality Among Role Players, Online Gamers, and Other Dwellers of Imaginary Realms
- Joyce Maynard, American author and journalist
- Lincoln Peirce, author of comic strip Big Nate
- Stefany Shaheen, U.S. Representative-elect
- Carol Shea-Porter, U.S. Representative
- Robert Eggers, film director and screenwriter
- Scott Poteet, SpaceX astronaut
