= Robert G. Greenler =

American physicist

- Born: 10/24/1929
- Died: 9/21/2025
- Education: University of Rochester, Johns Hopkins University
- Scientific career
- Fields: Physics
- Workplaces: University of Wisconsin–Milwaukee

Robert G. Greenler was an American physicist. His research centered on the optical properties of surfaces. Greenler received his B.S. from the University of Rochester and a Ph.D. from Johns Hopkins University. He taught physics at the University of Wisconsin–Milwaukee from 1962-1992. He became professor emeritus of the same university after his retirement.

Greenler was president of the Optical Society of America in 1987. He was the recipient of the Robert A. Millikan award in 1988.

He is well known for his popular lectures on physics "The Science Bag", which he started with colleague Glenn Schmieg in 1973. "The Science Bag" is a family friendly lecture series on every Friday evening and one Sunday a month at UW-Milwaukee Physics Building. In its 30-year existence the program attracted a cumulative audience of over 140,000 people.

== Awards ==
- University of Wisconsin-Milwaukee Ernest Spaights Plaza Award
- Optical Society of America Esther Hoffman Beller Award.
- Esther Hoffman Beller Medal 1993
- American Association of Physics Teachers Robert A. Millikan award, 1988

Elected Fellow of the American Association for the Advancement of Science

== Books ==
Rainbows, Halos, and Glories 1980. (ISBN 0 521 23605 3)

Chasing the Rainbow: Recurrences in the Life of a Scientist 2000. (ISBN 1 58619 051 2; hbk) (ISBN 1 58619 052 0; pbk)

Outside My Window: A Look at the Oakwood Village Nature Preserve (ISBN 978-1-304-75444-8)

== See also ==
- Optical Society of America § Past Presidents of the OSA
