= Alexander Calandra =

Scientist, educator, and author

Alexander Calandra (January 12, 1911 – March 8, 2006) was a scientist, educator, and author, perhaps best remembered for his short story, "Angels on a Pin (101 Ways to Use a Barometer)."

== Early life and education ==
Calandra was born in Brooklyn, New York to Rosina Calandra (née Gagliano) and Lucio Calandra, immigrants from Sicily. Calandra received his bachelor's degree in chemistry from Brooklyn College in 1935. He taught there while pursuing his PhD at New York University, where he received an MA in 1938 and a PhD in chemistry in 1940.

== Career ==
Calandra was a visiting professor of chemistry at the University of Chicago from 1945 to 1948, acting as assistant to Enrico Fermi, at which time Calandra shifted the focus of his studies from chemistry to physics. During this period, Fermi was working on the nuclear bomb. Fermi brought Calandra to the attention of the Nobel laureate physicist Arthur Holly Compton, and when Compton moved to St. Louis to become chancellor of Washington University in St. Louis in 1948, he invited Calandra there, to develop a program of science education for liberal arts students. Calandra advocated for "science as organized common sense."

In 1969 Calandra joined the faculty of Webster College as chairman of the science department, where he worked to develop programs until 1980. He also served on the Ministry of Education in Jamaica. and taught in the department of Physics in the Arts and Sciences at Washington University in St. Louis from 1948 until retirement in 1979.

Calandra served as a consultant to the school systems in St. Louis and other areas. An article in The New York Times of January 25, 1964, ("Grade Schools Accused of Stressing Sensation and Ignoring Basic Facts, 'Sputnik Panic' Blamed: Professor of Physics Tells at Parley Here of Two Major Defects"), outlined Dr. Calandra's views, as presented to a symposium on elementary school science teaching at the annual meeting of the American Association of Physics Teachers. He was an educational consultant for several institutions and foundations, including the Ford Foundation, the Thomas Alva Edison Foundation, and the National Science Foundation. He also consulted for the Educational Testing Service (then called the Cooperative Test Service).

Calandra died March 8, 2006. He was married to Martha Olmsted Calandra. They had three children.

== Angels on the Head of a Pin ==
Calandra was an advocate of non-traditional teaching and learning methods. His 'Barometer Story', which came to be known as "Angels on the Head of a Pin", continues to be widely read and discussed. It first appeared in 1961 in Calandra's book, "The Teaching of Elementary Science and Mathematics". It was popularized through its appearance in 'The Saturday Review" (Dec. 21, 1968, p. 60), with the title "Angels on the Head of a Pin. A Modern Parable". The story has since been published (in both legal and illegal formats) hundreds of times. An article written by John A. Osmundsen in the New York Times, entitled "Science Teacher Chides Teachers: Tale of a Student Outlines an 'Unscientific Method." and including a photo of Calandra, appeared on March 8, 1964. Osmundsen discussed the story as an attack on closed-minded teaching methods, advocating encouragement of nontraditional problem-solving techniques.

== Honors ==
In 1979 Calandra received the Robert A. Millikan award for excellence in the teaching of Physics. A biography by Albert A Bartlett (University of Colorado) was written at the time., where he describes Calandra as having "devoted a lifetime to the challenging task of imparting an interest in and an understanding of science to students of all ages."

His correspondence with Richard Feynman (dating 1968–1979) is at Caltech, in the Feynman Papers.

== Publications ==
- "The College Chemistry Testing Program 1941-42", J. Chem. Educ., 1943, 20 (3), p. 141.
- "Teaching Signed Numbers in Grade 9", The Arithmetic Teacher, Vol. 5, No. 5 (November 1958), pp. 259–260
- "Integrated Science and Mathematics in Junior High School", The American Mathematical Monthly, Vo. 69, No. 1 (Jan., 1962), pp. 55–56
- "The Role of Mathematics in an Integrated 9th Grade Science-Mathematics Course", The American Mathematical Monthly, Vol. 66, No. 5 (May, 1959), pp. 415–417
- "Experiment in the Teaching of Russian in the Elementary School", (with Charles J. McClain) *The Modern Language Journal, Vol. 43, No. 4 (Apr., 1959), pp. 183–184
- "The Art of Teaching Physics" 1979
- "What is Physics?" American Journal of Physics 38: 126, 1970.

Reviews: Robert Kalin, "Symbols by Alexander Calandra" The Arithmetic Teacher, Vol. 9, No. 6 (October 1962), pp. 346–347, 354
