= Sallie Watkins =

American physics educator

Sallie Ann Watkins (1922–2011, also known as Sister Mary Howard) was an American physics educator, academic administrator, Catholic nun, and activist.

== Life and work ==
Watkins was originally from Jacksonville, Florida, where she was born on June 27, 1922.

She joined the Sisters of Notre Dame of Coesfeld, taking the name Sister Mary Howard, and graduated from Notre Dame College near Cleveland, Ohio, in 1945. After five years as a high school chemistry teacher at the Notre Dame Academy (Toledo, Ohio), she returned to Notre Dame College as a physics lecturer. While continuing to hold her position at Notre Dame College, she went to the Catholic University of America for graduate study in physics from 1954 until 1958, receiving a master's degree and completing a Ph.D. with the dissertation Ultrasonic Absorption and Velocity in Liquid Monochloroethane.

In 1966, activized by the reforms of the Second Vatican Council, Watkins and several other members of her sisterhood renounced their religious names, left Notre Dame College, and formed a new community in Pueblo, Colorado, calling themselves the Community of Christian Service. Watkins took a faculty position at Southern Colorado State College, which later became the University of Southern Colorado and then Colorado State University Pueblo. There, she moved into academic administration as the chair of the department of physics, dean of the university's College of Science and Mathematics, and its assistant vice president for research. After a term in 1987 as the first senior education fellow of the American Institute of Physics, in Washington, DC, she retired as professor emerita in 1988.

She died on December 21, 2011, in Pueblo, Colorado.

== Activism ==
In the 1960s, Watkins was a protestor against the Vietnam War. She was the first person in Colorado to join the National Organization for Women.

In her retirement, Watkins was active in overseeing elementary-school science programs, especially those aimed at improving the participation of women and underrepresented minorities in science. She became an early advocate for and participant in environmentally friendly housing, and lived in a house that pioneered both passive solar building design and the use of solar cells to achieve a negative net energy usage.

The Catholic community that she helped found in Pueblo later became known as St. Anthony's Community, after it moved in 1972 to St. Anthony's Church; in the 1980s, it also began running a soup kitchen at the same church. The church closed in 1988, but the community continued; at her initiative it was later renamed as the St. Charles Community, honoring both St. Charles Borromeo and a local bishop, Charles Buswell. She continued to remain active in the community until her death, and to lead its services when needed.

== Recognition ==
Watkins was the 2001 recipient of the Robert A. Millikan award of the American Association of Physics Teachers. Her award lecture was entitled 'Can "Descriptive" End with "A"?'.
