= Lillian McDermott Medal =

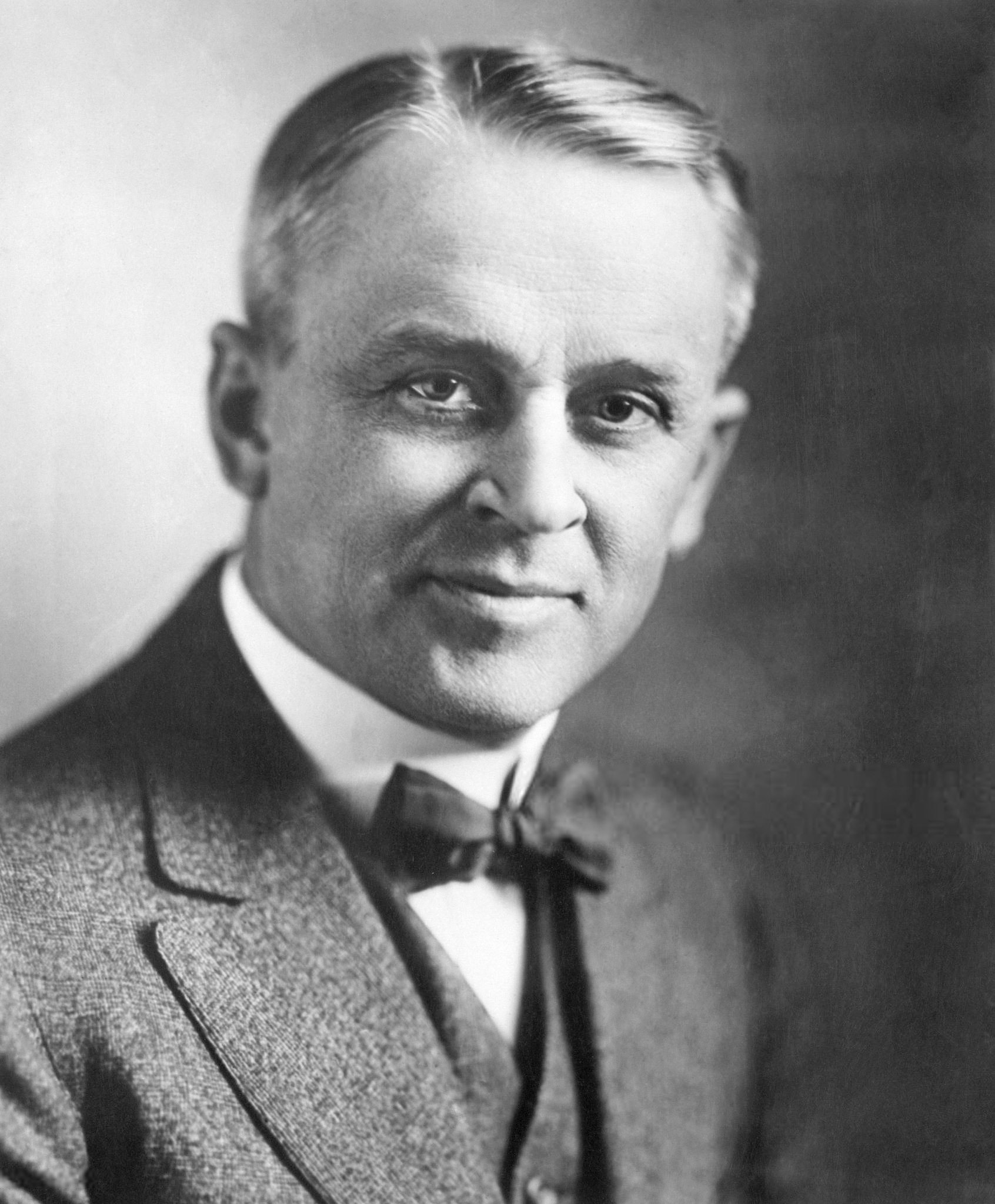
Robert A. Millikan

The Lillian McDermott Medal, established in 2021, is awarded annually by the American Association of Physics Teachers (AAPT). Named after Lillian Christie McDermott, the Medal "recognizes those who are passionate and tenacious about improving the teaching and learning of physics and have made intellectually creative contributions in this area".

The Robert A. Millikan award was the medal previously given by the AAPT to individuals who provide notable contributions to the teaching of physics. The award was established in 1962; the winner received a monetary award and certificate and delivered an address at an AAPT summer meeting. In the spring of 2021, the AAPT Board of Directors removed Millikan's name from the award.

== Lillian McDermott Medal winners ==
Year	Name	Institution	Address
2024	Stephanie Chasteen		"You only get one—My life pursuing excellence in physics education"
2022	Wolfgang Christian	Davidson College	"The Promise and Impact of Computation for Teaching"

== Robert A. Millikan Medal winners ==
Year	Name	Institution	Address
2021	Gregory Francis	Montana State University	"Two Red Bricks: Is A Good Lecture Better Than No Lecture At All?"
2020	David M. Cook	Lawrence University	"Attempting the (seemingly) Impossible"
2019	Tom Greenslade	Kenyon College	"Adventures with Oscillations and Waves"
2018	Kyle Forinash III	Indiana University Southeast	"Breaking out of the Physics Silo"
2017	Kenneth Heller	University of Minnesota	"Can We Get There from Here?"
2016	Stephen M. Pompea	National Optical Astronomy Observatory	"Knowledge and Wonder: Reflections on Ill-Structured Problem Solving" (Video on YouTube)
2015	Robert A. Morse	St. Albans School	"Facets of Physics Teaching-Pedagogical Engineering in the High School Classroom"
2014	Eugenia Etkina	Rutgers University	"Students of Physics: Listeners, Observers, or Collaborative Participants?"
2013	Harvey Gould	Clark University	"New Challenges for Old Physics Departments"
2012	Philip M. Sadler	Harvard–Smithsonian Center for Astrophysics	"Separating Facts From Fad: How Our Choices Impact Students' Performance and Persistence in Physics"
2011	Brian Jones	Colorado State University	"All I Really Need to Know About Physics Education I Learned in Kindergarten"
2010	Patricia M. Heller	University of Minnesota	"Guiding the Future: Developing Research-based Physics Standards"
2009	Arthur Eisenkraft	University of Massachusetts Boston	"Physics for All: From Special Needs to Olympiads"
2008	Eric Mazur	Harvard University	"The Make-Believe World of Real-World Physics"
2007	David Sokoloff	University of Oregon	"Building a New, More Exciting Mouse Trap is Not Enough"
2006	Art Hobson	University of Arkansas	"Thoughts on Physics Education for the 21st Century"
2005	John S. Rigden	Washington University in St. Louis	"The Mystique of Physics: Relumine the Enlightenment"
2004	Kenneth S. Krane	Oregon State University	"The Challenges of Teaching Modern Physics"
2003	Fred M. Goldberg	San Diego State University	"Research and Development in Physics Education: Focusing on Students' Thinking"
2002	Simon George	California State University	"Global Study of the Role of the Laboratory in Physics Educations"
2001	Sallie A. Watkins	University of Southern Colorado	"Can "Descriptive" End with "A"?"
2000	Thomas D. Rossing	Northern Illinois University	"Beauty in Physics and the Arts"
1999	Alan Van Heuvelen	Ohio State University	"Research About Physics Learning, Linguistics, Our Minds, and the Workplace"
1998	Edward F. Redish	University of Maryland	"Building a Science of Teaching Physics: Learning What Works and Why"
1997	David Griffiths	Reed College	"Is there a Text in This Class?"
1996	Priscilla Laws	Dickinson College	"Promoting Active Learning Based on Physics Education Research in Introductory Physics Courses"
1995	Dean Zollman	Kansas State University	"Do They Just Sit There? Reflections on Helping Students Learn Physics"
1994	Frederick Reif	Carnegie Mellon University	"Understanding and Teaching Important Scientific Thought Processes"
1993	James A. Minstrell	Mercer Island High School	"Creating an Environment for Reconstructing Understanding and Reasoning about the Physical World"
1992	Robert G. Fuller	University of Nebraska–Lincoln	"Hypermedia and the Knowing of Physics Standing Upon the Shoulders of Giants"
1991	Don Herbert	Mr. Wizard Studios	"Behind the Scenes of Mr. Wizard"
1990	Lillian C. McDermott	University of Washington	"What We Teach and What Is Learned—Closing the Gap"
1989	Peter Lindenfeld	Rutgers University	"The Einsteinization of Physics"
1988	Robert G. Greenler	University of Wisconsin–Milwaukee	"Beetles, Bubbles, and Butterflies Iridescence in Nature"
1987	Donald Glenn Ivey	University of Toronto	"Educational Television An Oxymoron?"
1986	Mario Iona	University of Denver	"Why Johnny Can't Learn Physics from Textbooks I have Known"
1985	James Gerhart	University of Washington	"Handling Numbers"
1984	Earl F. Zwicker	Illinois Institute of Technology	"Life, Learning, and the Phunomenological [sic] Approach"
1983	Gerald F. Wheeler	Montana State University	"The Emerging Telecommunications Network: New Conduit to Learners"
1982	Paul G. Hewitt	City College of San Francisco	"The Missing Essential A Conceptual Understanding of Physics"
1981	Albert A. Bartlett	University of Colorado Boulder	"Are We Overlooking Something?"
1980	Thomas D. Miner	Garden City High School	"Prides and Prejudices of a Physics Teacher"
1979	Alexander Calandra	Washington University in St. Louis	"The Art of Teaching Physics"
1978	Alfred Bork	University of California, Irvine	"Interactive Learning"
1977	C. Luther Andrews	University at Albany	"Microwave Optics"
1976	Tung Hon Jeong	Lake Forest College	"Holography"
1975	Harold A. Daw	New Mexico State University	"Physics Instructional Apparatus and Things"
1974	Harald Jensen	Lake Forest College	"A Retired Physics Teacher Reminisces"
1973	Frank Oppenheimer	Exploratorium	"Teaching and Learning"
1972	Arnold A. Strassenburg	Stony Brook University	"The Evolution of Physics Teaching"
1971	Harry F. Meiners	Rensselaer Polytechnic Institute	"Problems of Science Education in Underdeveloped Countries"
1970	Franklin Miller, Jr.	Kenyon College	"A Long Look at the Short Film"
1969	John M. Fowler	University of Maryland, College Park	"Content and Process in Physics Teaching"
1968	Alan Holden	Bell Labs	"Artistic Invitations to the Study of Physics"
1967	Gerald Holton	Harvard University	"Oildrops and Subelectrons"
1966	Alan M. Portis	University of California, Berkeley	"Electrons, Photons, and Students"
1965	John G. King	Massachusetts Institute of Technology	"The Undergraduate Physics Laboratory and Reality"
1964	H. Victor Neher	California Institute of Technology	"Millikan: Teacher and Friend"
1962	Paul E. Klopsteg	Northwestern University	"The Early Days of the American Association of Physics Teachers"

== See also ==
- List of physics awards
