= Lillian C. McDermott =

American physicist (1931–2020)

- Born: 1931; Washington Heights, Manhattan, USA
- Died: July 8, 2020 (aged 88–89)
- Spouse: Mark McDermott (d. 2006)
- Awards: 1990 Robert A. Millikan award

Academic background
- Education: AB, 1952, Vassar College; MA, 1956, PhD., experimental nuclear physics, 1959, Columbia University
- Thesis: Elastic scattering of alpha-particles by oxygen-16 (1959)
- Doctoral advisor: William W. Havens Jr.

Academic work
- Institutions: University of Washington; Seattle University
- Doctoral students: Rachel Scherr

Lillian Christie McDermott (1931 – July 8, 2020) was an American physicist. In the early 1970s, McDermott established the Physics Education Group (PEG) at the University of Washington to "improve the teaching and learning of physics from kindergarten all the way through graduate school." She was recognized for her many contributions to the field of physics education research with an election to the American Physical Society in 1990.

== Early life and education ==
McDermott was born in 1931 and raised in Washington Heights, Manhattan to Greek immigrant parents. Her father was a lawyer in the Greek government prior to immigrating and her mother came to the United States as a teenager. She graduated from Hunter College High School, at the time an all-girls school, before enrolling at Vassar College for her Bachelor of Arts degree.

While a student at Vassar College, McDermott had a music scholarship that funded her piano lessons, and she took courses in music theory, art history, and philosophy. She also studied physics and received a bachelor's degree in physics in 1952. Following this, she enrolled at Columbia University for her graduate degree in physics with a specialization in nuclear physics. She received her PhD in 1959.

== Career ==
Upon completing her formal education, McDermott began teaching physics full time at City College before moving to the University of Washington (UW) with her husband for a post-doctoral position.

Although her husband was granted a faculty position, she was unable to join him due to anti-nepotism rules. She sought employment at Seattle University before the rules were struck down and she joined the Department of Physics at UW.

In the early 1970s, McDermott established the Physics Education Group (PEG) to "improve the teaching and learning of physics from kindergarten all the way through graduate school." The PEG was the first research group in the United States where students could earn a physics PhD with a research concentration in the teaching and learning of physics. McDermott led the PEG in studying student reasoning and misconceptions in physics. This work resulted in the development of the Tutorials in Introductory Physics, as well as a curriculum for future teachers titled Physics by Inquiry.

== Awards and recognitions ==
She was recognized "for her many significant contributions to the field research in physics education, especially in the area of conceptual difficulties and her role in the development of educational outreach programs at the University of Washington" with an election to the American Physical Society in 1990.

She also received the American Association of Physics Teachers (AAPT) Robert A. Millikan Lecture Award in the same year. In 2021, this award was renamed the Lillian McDermott Medal in her honor. In 2014, she was the recipient of UW's University Faculty Lecture Award, one of the highest honors at the institution.

== Publications ==
- McDermott, Lillian C.; DeWater, Lezlie S. "The Need for Special Science Courses for Teachers: Two Perspectives," Inquiring into Inquiry Learning and Teaching in Science (2000)
- McDermott, Lillian C.; "Combined physics course for future elementary and secondary school teachers," American Journal of Physics 42, 668-676 (1974)
- McDermott, Lillian C.; "Improving high school physics teacher preparation," Physics Teacher 13, 523-529 (1975)
