= Kenneth Saul Krane =

Physicist at Oregon State University

Professor Emeritus Kenneth Saul Krane
- Born: 1944 (age 81–82); Philadelphia
- Occupation: Nuclear physicist
- Board member of: OSU Honors College Board of Regents
- Spouse: Paula (Dorn) Krane
- Parent(s): Alexander Krane and Sara (Wurts) Krane

Academic background
- Education: 1961 Cornell freshman; 1965 B.S, University of Arizona; 1967 M.S., Purdue; 1970 Ph.D., Purdue

Academic work
- Discipline: Physics
- Institutions: Los Alamos National Laboratory; Lawrence Berkeley National Laboratory; Oregon State University

Kenneth Saul Krane (born 1944) is a Professor Emeritus of Oregon State University, whose research included experimental nuclear physics as well as physics education curriculum development. He is a fellow of the American Physical Society and the recipient of the Robert A. Millikan Medal of the American Association of Physics Teachers.

== Early life and education ==
Kenneth Krane, the son of Alexander Krane and Sara (Wurts) Krane, was born in 1944 in Philadelphia. He is the eldest of three children, with younger brother and sister. In 1953, his family moved to Tucson, Arizona, where his parents owned a clock repair shop. He said when he watched a clock pendulum as a nine-year old, he was "wanting to understand the forces behind its motions."

Krane was an honors student at Temple Emanu-El, and his Bar Mitvah was in 1957. He graduated from Rincon High School, with a scholarship to Cornell, where he studied his freshman year, then transferred to the University of Arizona, where he completed his B.S. in 1965. In Arizona, he met Paula Dorn; they married in 1966.

In 1970, Krane earned his Ph.D. in nuclear physics at Purdue University, with his dissertation titled, Measurement of Quadrupole-Dipole Mixing Amplitudes of Gamma Transitions Between Collective States of Even - Nuclei Using the Angular Correlation Method, which was advised by Rolf Steffen.

== Career ==
In 1970, Krane "faced a job market with nearly impossible odds: in 1970 more than 1,400 advanced physics degrees were conferred in the United States with only 300 academic jobs available." Krane accepted post-doctoral positions at Los Alamos National Laboratory and Lawrence Berkeley National Laboratory before accepting a position in the Oregon State University Department of Physics in 1974. He became Professor Emeritus in 2003.

=== Positions held ===
- 1974–2003, Department of Physics, the College of Science, Oregon State University, as Assistant Professor, Associate Professor, and Professor
- 1984–1998, Department Chair and Director of Engineering Physics Program
- 1993–1994, Program Director for Physics, Division of Undergraduate Education, National Science Foundation
- 2003–present, Professor Emeritus
- 2010–2022, OSU Honors College Board of Regents

=== Research ===
==== Experimental Nuclear Physics ====
Krane's scientific research has focused on radioactive decay, nuclear structure, and nuclear spectroscopy:

- Radioactive decay is the subject in his Introductory Nuclear Physics, chapter 8.
- Nuclear Structure and Spectroscopy: Krane investigated the internal structure of atomic nuclei using high-resolution analysis of complex gamma decay schemes. He explored "gamma ray coincidence studies... 2 gamma ray detectors looking at gamma rays that are emitted in sequence." He said nuclear spectroscopy "...is exactly my field of expertise."
- Nuclear Orientation: Krane worked with Bill Steyert in Los Alamos. Krane probed ultra-low temperature hyperfine interactions and fundamental nuclear symmetries using "low-temperature apparatus to do these parity violation experiments."
- Neutron Capture Cross Section: Krane conducted experiments to measure the probability of neutron-nucleus interactions, using the neutron irradiation facilities at the Oregon State University Radiation Center. Krane said, "I did a few experiments, the angular-correlation experiments with sources that I produced here on the reactor at the radiation center, but they were few and far between. I really maintained that apparatus as a kind of training ground for my Ph.D. students who would go off on these accelerator experiments with me."

==== Physics Education Research and Curriculum Development ====
Krane is known for his contributions to how physics is taught:

- Textbook Authorship: Krane is the author of foundational textbooks, including Introductory Nuclear Physics, Modern Physics, and is a co-author of later editions of Physics, volume 2, with David Halliday and Robert Resnick.
- Curriculum Reform: Krane has managed National Science Foundation grants dedicated to improving physics instruction, designing undergraduate research experiences, and modernizing course curricula.
- National Policy Leadership: Krane has held leadership roles in physics education policy, serving as the chair of the American Physical Society Committee on Education and the American Institute of Physics Advisory Committee on Physics Education.

Krane has focused on problems of nuclear orientation, including organization of two relevant workshops, for a research facility built around the University Isotope Separator at Oak Ridge National Laboratory. He has been recognized for his research in nuclear spectroscopy and nuclear orientation. Krane chaired the "Second International Conference on On-Line Nuclear Orientation and Related Topics" at Oak Ridge in October, 1991.

Krane was also associate editor of Hypeifine Interaction, a journal on research in the "border regions of nuclear, atomic, and solid state physics." Krane has "published 92 scientific research papers and two book chapters comprehensively reviewing his research field."

== Selected publications ==
- Krane, K.S. (29 Jan 2021). "Gamma-ray spectrometry in the decays of odd-mass Pt isotopes produced by neutron irradiation of natural Pt". ScienceDirect.
- Krane, K. S. (11 Jan 2021). "Cross sections and isomer ratios in the Rb(n,γ) and Sr(n,γ)reactions". The European Physical Journal A. 57 (1): 19. doi:10.1140/epja/s10050-020-00299-2. ISSN 1434-601X.
- Hager IV, W.W.; Krane, K.S. (1 Oct 2020). "The angular correlation factor in gamma-ray coincidence summing". Nuclear Instruments and Methods in Physics Research Section A: Accelerators, Spectrometers, Detectors and Associated Equipment. 976. ISSN 0168-9002.
- Krane, Kenneth (13 May 2019). "Neutron capture cross sections of 178/Hf leading to /179Hf 𝑚2". Physical Review C.
- Manogue, Corinne A.; Krane, Kenneth S. (2003). "Paradigms in Physics: Restructuring the Upper Level" (PDF). Physics Today.
- Krane, K. S. (Dec 1983). "Dilute impurity hyperfine fields in Fe, Co, Ni, Gd". Hyperfine Interact. 16 (1–4): 1069–1079. ISSN 0304-3843.
- Krane, Kenneth S. (October 1975). "E2,M1 multipole mixing ratios in even-even nuclei, A ≥ 152". Atomic Data and Nuclear Data Tables. 16 (4): 383–408 – via Elsevier Science Direct.
- Krane, K.S.; Steffen, R.M.; Wheeler, R.M. (April 1973). "Directional correlations of gamma radiations emitted from nuclear states oriented by nuclear reactions or cryogenic methods". ScienceDirect.
- Krane, K. S. (1972). "Solid-angle correction factors for coaxial Ge (Li) detectors". Nuclear Instruments and Methods. 98 (2). Elsevier: 205–210.
- Krane, K. S.; Olsen, C. E.; Sites, James R.; Steyert, W. A. (1971-11-01). "Parity-Violating Asymmetry of the 501-keV Gamma Ray Emitted in the Decay of exp|180m Hf". Physical Review C. 4 (5). American Physical Society: 1906–1913. doi:10.1103/PhysRevC.4.1906.
- Krane, K. S.; Steffen, R. M. (1970-08-01). "Determination of the E2/M1 Multipole Mixing Ratios of the Gamma Transitions in Cd 110". Physical Review C. 2 (2): 724–734. doi:10.1103/PhysRevC.2.724. ISSN 0556-2813.

== Awards, honors ==
- Fellow of the American Physical Society, cited "For his successful program in developing and applying angular-correlation and nuclear-orientation techniques to studies of nuclear structure, and for his contribution to training of students through textbook writing.
- Robert A. Millikan Medal, American Association of Physics Teachers, cited for "notable and creative contributions, so various and wide ranging, from writing fine textbooks, to (developing) successful new faculty workshops," and for his "national leadership and extending physics to diverse constituencies."
- American Association of Physics Teachers Homer L. Dodge Citation for Distinguished Service to AAPT, 2017
- OSU Alumni Association's Distinguished Faculty Award, 1993
- D. Curtis Mumford Faculty Service Award
- Distinguished Alumnus of Purdue, 1992
