= Etkind =

Etkind is a surname. Notable people with the surname include:

- Alexander Etkind (born 1955), historian and cultural scientist
- Efim Etkind (1918–1999), Soviet philologist and translation theorist

== See also ==
- Etkin, a surname
