= Patricia Heller =

American physics educator

Patricia M. Heller is a retired American scholar of physics education, and an associate professor emerita at the University of Minnesota. She is known for her research on physics instructor attitudes and on cooperative learning, for which she received the Robert A. Millikan award of the American Association of Physics Teachers.

== Education and career ==
Heller studied physics, with a minor in chemistry, as an undergraduate at the University of Washington. She graduated in 1966, and continued there for a master's degree in 1969. After working for four more years at the University of Washington as a physics instructor, assisting Arnold Arons with a project in elementary school education, she became a doctoral student in science education at the University of Michigan. As a student, she continued to work there as a physics instructor, and in Detroit, Michigan, as an elementary school science teacher. She completed her Ph.D. in 1977.

In 1979, she joined the University of Minnesota as a lecturer in the College of Education. She switched to a lecturer position in the School of Physics and Astronomy in 1982 and then, in 1986, returned to the College of Education as an associate professor in the Department of Curriculum and Instruction. She retired as an associate professor emerita in 2004.

== Recognition ==
Heller was the 2010 recipient of the Robert A. Millikan award of the American Association of Physics Teachers.
