= Eugenia Etkina =

Russian-American physics educator

Eugenia Etkina is a retired Russian and American scholar of physics education, focused on teacher preparation and professional development, and an author of physics textbooks centered on the Investigative Science Learning Environment framework for physics education and the Physics Union Mathematics high school curriculum. She is a distinguished professor of physics education, emeritus, in the Graduate School of Education of Rutgers University.

== Education and career ==
Etkina is the daughter of physics and mathematics professors at Moscow State Pedagogical University; as non-religious Jews in the Soviet Union, more advanced levels of academia were blocked to the family. She grew up in the shadow of a mathematically talented older sister, and thought of herself instead as being an ice skater, until her sister's death of a heart defect, when Etkina was 15, led Etkina to a determination to take her sister's place.

She earned bachelor's and master's degrees in 1982 in physics and astronomy from Moscow State Pedagogical University, and became a high school teacher at Moscow Southwest High School no 1543 in 1982. There, she became chair of the physics department and assistant principal from 1992 to 1995. She received a Ph.D. in physics education in 1997 through Moscow State Pedagogical University, with a dissertation on teaching physics to gifted students.

In 1995 she moved to Rutgers University as a research associate in the Department of Physics and Astronomy and the Math & Science Learning Center, teaching physics to at-risk university students. On completing her doctorate in 1997 she became an assistant professor in the Graduate School of Education. She was promoted to associate professor in 2003, full professor in 2010, and distinguished professor in 2017.

== Textbooks ==
Etkina is the coauthor of physics textbooks including The Physics Active Learning Guide (with A. Van Heuvelen, Addison Wesley, 2006) and College Physics (with Van Heuvelen and Michael Gentile, Pearson, 2014).

== Recognition ==
Etkina received the 2012 Distinguished Service Citation of the American Association of Physics Teachers (AAPT), and the 2014 Robert A. Millikan award of the AAPT. She is also a Fellow of the AAPT, and a recipient of the New Jersey Teacher Educator of the year award.
