= Microbeam =

A microbeam is a narrow beam of radiation, of micrometer or sub-micrometer dimensions. Together with integrated imaging techniques, microbeams allow precisely defined quantities of damage to be introduced at precisely defined locations. Thus, the microbeam is a tool for investigators to study intra- and inter-cellular mechanisms of damage signal transduction.

Essentially, an automated imaging system locates user-specified targets, and these targets are sequentially irradiated, one by one, with a highly-focused radiation beam. Targets can be single cells, sub-cellular locations, or precise locations in 3D tissues. Key features of a microbeam are throughput, precision, and accuracy. While irradiating targeted regions, the system must guarantee that adjacent locations receive no energy deposition.

== History ==
The first microbeam facilities were developed in the mid-90s. These facilities were a response to challenges in studying radiobiological processes using broadbeam exposures. Microbeams were originally designed to address two main issues:

1. The belief that the radiation-sensitivity of the nucleus was not uniform, and
2. The need to be able to hit an individual cell with an exact number (particularly one) of particles for low dose risk assessment.

Additionally, microbeams were seen as ideal vehicles to investigate the mechanisms of radiation response.

=== Radiation-sensitivity of the cell ===
At the time it was believed that radiation damage to cells was entirely the result of damage to DNA. Charged particle microbeams could probe the radiation sensitivity of the nucleus, which at the time appeared not to be uniformly sensitive. Experiments performed at microbeam facilities have since shown the existence of a bystander effect. A bystander effect is any biological response to radiation in cells or tissues that did not experience a radiation traversal. These "bystander" cells are neighbors of cells that have experienced a traversal. The mechanism for the bystander effect is believed to be due to cell-to-cell communication. The exact nature of this communication is an area of active research for many groups.

=== Irradiation with an exact number of particles ===
At the low doses of relevance to environmental radiation exposure, individual cells only rarely experience traversals by an ionizing particle and almost never experience more than one traversal. For example, in the case of domestic radon exposure, cancer risk estimation involves epidemiological studies of uranium miners. These miners inhale radon gas, which then undergoes radioactive decay, emitting an alpha particle This alpha particle traverses the cells of the bronchial epithelium, potentially causing cancer. The average lifetime radon exposure of these miners is high enough that cancer risk estimates are driven by data on individuals whose target bronchial cells are subjected to multiple alpha particle traversals. On the other hand, for an average house occupant, about 1 in 2,500 target bronchial cells will be exposed per year to a single alpha particle, but less than 1 in 10^{7} of these cells will experience traversals by more than one particle. Therefore, in order to extrapolate from miner to environmental exposures, it is necessary to be able to extrapolate from the effects of multiple traversals to the effects of single traversals of a particle.

Due to the random distribution of particle tracks, the biological effects of an exact number (particularly one) of particles cannot practically be simulated in the laboratory using conventional broadbeam exposures. Microbeam techniques can overcome this limitation by delivering an exact number (one or more) of particles per cell nucleus. True single-particle irradiations should allow measurement of the effects of exactly one alpha particle traversal, relative to multiple traversals. The application of such systems to low frequency processes such as oncogenic transformation depends very much on the technology involved. With an irradiation rate of at least 5,000 cells per hour, experiments with yields of the order of 10^{−4} can practically be accomplished. Hence, high throughput is a desired quality for microbeam systems.

== Charged particle microbeam ==
The first microbeam facilities delivered charged particles. A charged particle microbeam facility must meet the following basic requirements:

1. The beam spot size should be on the order of a few micrometres or smaller, corresponding to cellular or sub-cellular dimensions.
2. Irradiations of living cells should take place at atmospheric pressure.
3. Beam current must be reduced to levels such that targets may be irradiated with an exact number of particles with high reproducibility.
4. An imaging system is required to visualize and register cellular targets.
5. Cell positioning must have high spatial resolution and reproducibility in order that the ion beam hit the target with a high degree of accuracy and precision.
6. A particle detector with high efficiency must count the number of particles per target and switch off the beam after the desired number of particles have been delivered.
7. Environmental conditions (humidity, for example) for cells must be maintained such that cells are under little or no stress.

=== Beam spot size ===
Beam spots with diameter down to about two micrometres can be obtained by collimating the beam with pinhole apertures or with a drawn capillary. Sub-micrometre beam spot sizes have been achieved by focusing the beam using various combinations of electrostatic or magnetic lenses. Both methods are used at present.

=== Vacuum window ===
A vacuum window is necessary in order to perform microbeam experiments on living cells. Generally, this is accomplished with the use of a vacuum-tight window of a polymer a few micrometres thick or 100-500 nm thick Silicon nitride.

=== Cell registration and positioning ===
Cells must be identified and targeted with a high degree of accuracy. This can be accomplished using cell staining and fluorescence microscopy or without staining through the use of techniques such as quantitative phase microscopy or phase contrast microscopy. Ultimately, the objective is to recognize cells, target them, and move them into position for irradiation as fast as possible. Throughputs of up to 15,000 cells per hour have been achieved.

=== Particle counters ===
Particles must be counted with a high degree of detection efficiency in order to guarantee that a specific number of ions are delivered to a single cell. Generally, detectors can be placed before or after the target to be irradiated. If the detector is placed after the target, the beam must have sufficient energy to traverse the target and reach the detector. If the detector is placed before the target, the detector must have a minimal effect on the beam. When the desired number of particles are detected, the beam is either deflected or shut off.

=== Other considerations ===
Living cells must be maintained under conditions that do not stress the cell, causing an unwanted biological response. Normally, cells must be attached to a substrate so that their position can be determined by the imaging system. Recent advancements in beam position control and high speed imaging have made flow through systems possible (Flow and Shoot).

== X-ray microbeam ==
Some facilities have developed or are developing soft x-ray microbeams. In these systems, zone plates are used to focus characteristic x rays generated from a target hit by a charged particle beam. When using synchrotron x-rays as a source, x-ray microbeam can be obtained by cutting the beam with a precise slit system due to high directionality of synchrotron radiation.

== Biological endpoint ==
Many biological endpoints have been studied including oncogenic transformation, apoptosis, mutations, and chromosomal aberrations.

== Microbeam systems worldwide ==
Microbeam facilities worldwide and their characteristics
Microbeam Facilities Worldwide	Radiation Type/LET	Beam Spot Size on Cell	Running Biology?
Radiological Research Accelerator Facility (RARAF), Columbia University	any cation, x rays low to very high	0.6 μm	yes
JAERI, Takasaki, Japan	high		yes
Special Microbeam Utilization Research Facility (SMURF), Texas A&M	low		no
Superconducting Nanoscope for Applied nuclear (Kern-)physics Experiments (SNAKE), LMU Munich	From p to HI; 2-10000 keV/μm	0.5 μm	yes
INFN-LABEC, Sesto Fiorentino, Florence, Italy	p, He, C other ions	10 μm for 3 MeV p	no
INFN-LNL Legnaro, Italy	p, ^{3}He^{+,++},^{4}He^{+,++} 7-150 keV/μm	10 μm	yes
CENBG, Bordeaux, France	p, α Up to 3.5 MeV	10 μm	
GSI, Darmstadt, Germany	From α to U-ions; Up to 11.4 MeV/n	0.5 μm	yes
IFJ, Cracow, Poland	p - Up to 2.5 MeV x ray - 4.5 keV	12 μm 5 μm	yes
LIPSION, Leipzig, Germany	p, ^{4}He^{+,++} Up to 3 MeV	0.5 μm	yes
Lund NMP, Lund, Sweden	p Up to 3 MeV	5 μm	
CEA-LPS, Saclay, France	p ^{4}He^{+,++} Up to 3.75 MeV	10 μm	yes
Queen's University, Belfast, Northern Ireland UK	x ray 0.3-4.5 keV	< 1 μm	yes
University of Surrey, Guilford, UK	p, α, HI	0.01 μm (in vacuum)	yes
PTB, Braunschweig, Germany	p, α 3-200 keV/μm	< 1 μm	yes
Single Particle Irradiation System to Cell (SPICE), National Institute of Radiological Sciences(NIRS), QST, Japan	p 3.4 MeV	2 μm	yes
W-MAST, Tsuruga, Japan	p, He	10 μm	no
McMaster University, Ontario, Canada			no
Nagasaki University, Nagasaki, Japan	x-rays 0.3-4.5 keV	< 1 μm	yes
Photon Factory, KEK, Japan	x-rays 4-20 keV	5 μm	yes
CAS-LIBB, Institute of Plasma Physics, CAS, Hefei, China	p 2-3 MeV	5 μm	yes
Centro Atómico Constituyentes, CNEA, Buenos Aires, Argentina	to H from U 15 MeV	5 μm	yes
FUDAN University, Shanghai, China	p,He; 3 MeV	2 μm	yes
Institute of Modern Physics CAS, Lanzhou, China			
Gray Laboratory, London	low, high		Yes
Gray Laboratory, London	soft X		Yes
PNL, Richland, Washington	low		Yes
Padua, Italy	soft X		Yes
MIT Boston	low, high		Yes
L'Aquila, Italy	high		No
LBL, Berkley	very high		No
University of Maryland	low		Yes
Tsukuba, Japan	soft X		Yes
Nagatani, Japan	low, high		Yes
Seoul, South Korea	low		Yes
Helsinki, Finland	high		No
Chapel Hill, North Carolina	low		No
Gradignan, France	high		Yes

== Microbeam Workshops ==
There have been nine international workshops, held approximately once every two years, on Microbeam Probes of Cellular Radiation Response. These workshops serve as an opportunity for microbeam personnel to come together and share ideas. The proceedings of the workshops serve as an excellent reference on the state of microbeam-related science.

List of eight microbeam workshops
International Workshops on Microbeam Probes of Cellular Radiation Response	Year	Number of Microbeams
Gray Laboratory, London	1993	3
Pacific Northwest Labs, Washington	1995	3
Columbia University, New York	1997	4
Dublin, Ireland	1999	7
Stresa, Italy	2001	12
Oxford, England	2003	17
Columbia University, New York	2006	28
NIRS, Chiba, Japan	2008	31
GSI, Darmstadt, Germany	2010	
Columbia University, New York	2012	
Bordeaux, France	2013	
Tsuruga, Fukui, Japan	2015	
Manchester, UK	2017	
