= Nevis Laboratories =

American research center affiliated with Columbia University

Coordinates: 41.0275°N 73.8728°W

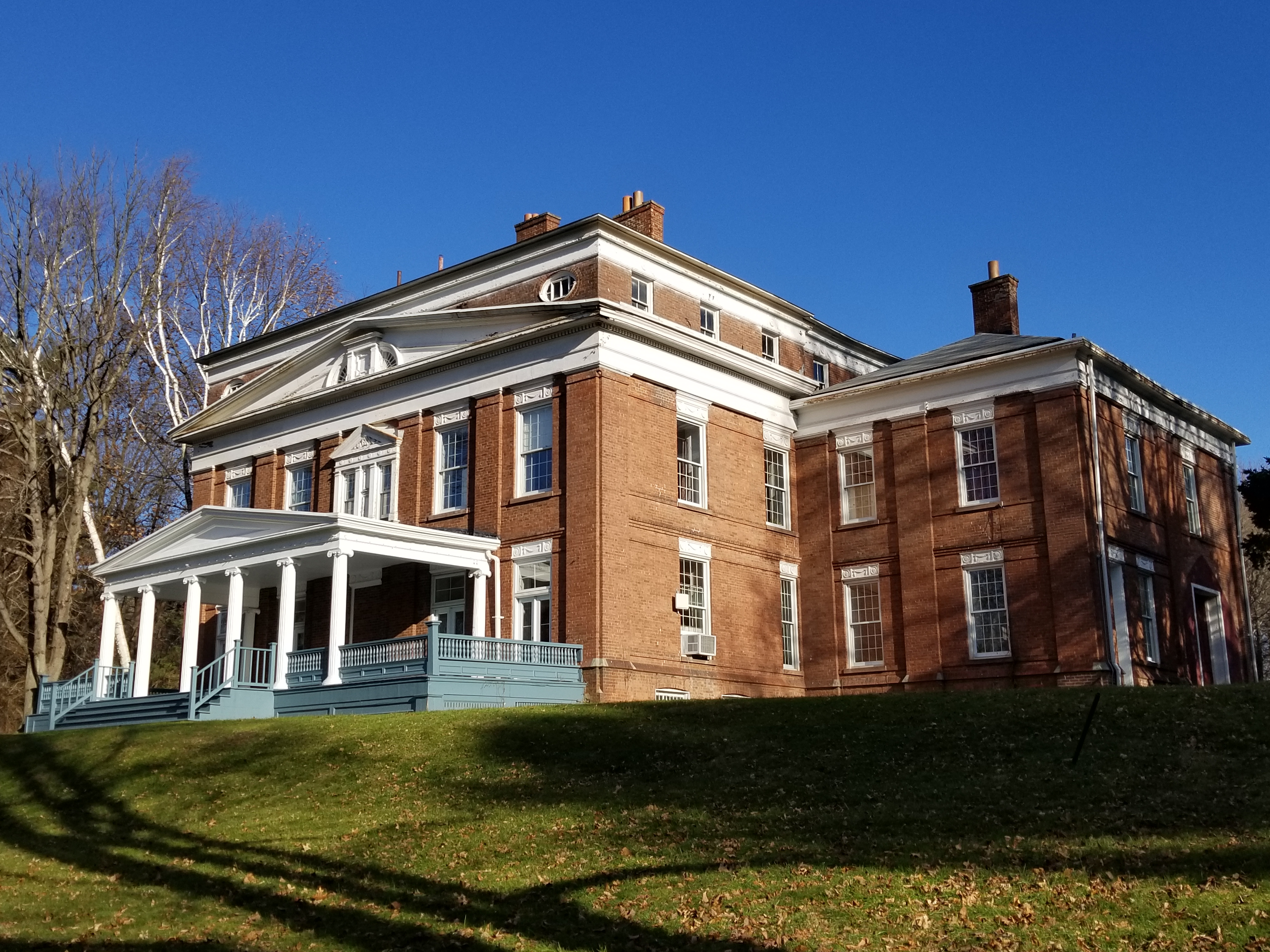
Nevis Mansion House

Nevis Labs is a research center owned and operated by Columbia University. It is located in Irvington, New York, on the 60-acre (240,000 m^{2}) property originally owned by Col. James Alexander Hamilton, the son of Alexander Hamilton, a graduate of Columbia College. James Hamilton built his mansion on this estate and named it Nevis in honor of the birthplace of his father.

The land was donated to the university by a branch of the DuPont family. Construction of the 400 MeV Nevis synchrocyclotron took place between 1947 and 1949. University president Dwight D. Eisenhower inaugurated the accelerator in June 1950. During its period of operation from 1950 until 1972, it was one of the world's most productive accelerators.

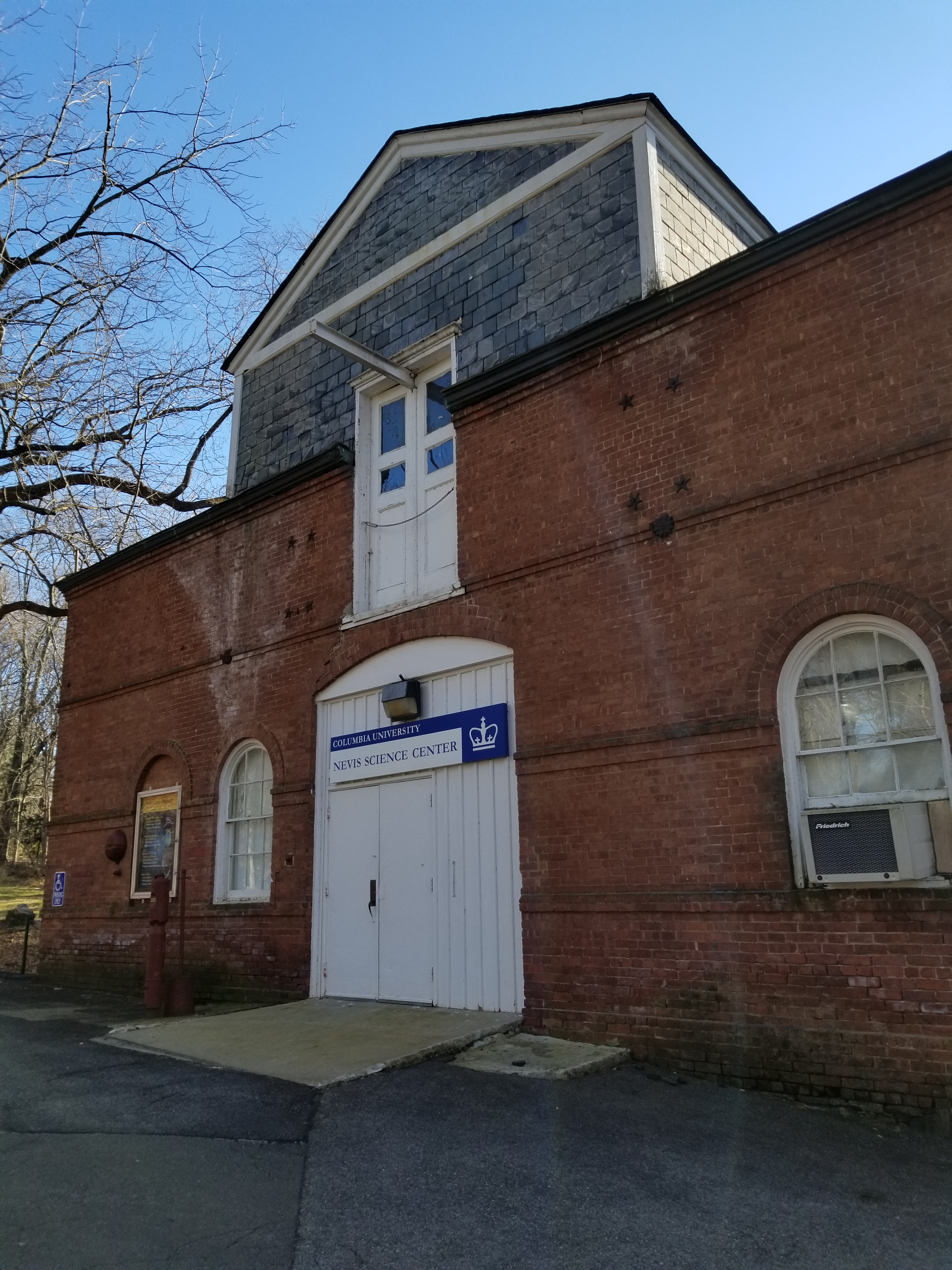
Nevis Science Center

Currently the laboratory specializes in the preparation, design, and construction of high-energy particle and nuclear experiments and equipment. These are transported to major laboratories worldwide. The lab also performs data analysis for these experiments.

The laboratory is also home to the Radiological Research Accelerator Facility (RARAF) a National Institute of Biomedical Imaging and Bioengineering biotechnology resource center (P41) specializing in microbeam technology.

The Nevis campus is crossed by the Croton Aqueduct, the first water tunnel supplying New York City and now a popular walking and cycling trail.
