= Eastman Institute for Oral Health =

Dentistry school in Rochester, New York, US

Coordinates: 43.12395°N 77.62229°W

- Type: Private university
- Established: 1905
- Parent institution: University of Rochester
- Academic affiliations: University of Rochester Medical Center Strong Memorial Hospital Eastman Dental Dispensary
- Dean: Eli Eliav
- Faculty: 210 total faculty
- Students: 148 total residents
- Location: 625 Elmwood Avenue, Rochester, New York, U.S.
- Website: www.urmc.rochester.edu/dentistry.aspx

Eastman Institute for Oral Health of the University of Rochester is a school of dentistry and department of the University of Rochester School of Medicine and Dentistry located at the University of Rochester Medical Center in Rochester, New York, United States. Unlike other dental schools in the United States, it does not have an undergraduate dental program. It is affiliated with Strong Memorial Hospital.

The institution records over 180,000 patient visits a year and receives over $9 million in research funding as a location for oral health research in North America. Its programs receive over 1,200 applications every year for 40 positions, resulting in an acceptance rate of 3.3%. In 2011, it underwent a $5.9 million renovation. The school has ranked within the top 10 of National Institutes of Health (NIH)/National Institute of Dental and Craniofacial Research (NIDCR) research funding to dental institutions several times, including ranking seventh in 2020. In the year 2020, the Eastman Institute for Oral Health published over 150 peer-reviewed research publications.

== History ==
The origins of what is now the Eastman Institute for Oral Health trace back to 1905, when philanthropist George Eastman began funding free dental clinics in Rochester to provide underserved children with access to care.

Building on this commitment, Eastman made a major gift in 1915 to establish the Rochester Dental Dispensary, which formally opened in 1917. That same year, it graduated its first class of dental hygienists, the first such program in the United States.

In 1928, the University of Rochester Medical Center created the first oral biology research center in the US. The center grew into the Department of Dental Research in the School of Medicine and Dentistry.

Formal ties with the University of Rochester date to the 1920s, when Eastman Dental Center clinicians and University researchers collaborated on oral biology and dental research, URMC established what has been described as the nation’s first oral biology research center in 1928, and, in the ensuing decades, this work included NIH-supported oral health studies. Over the following decades, these collaborations grew into joint appointments and shared programs, culminating in 1997 when the Eastman Dental Center formally merged with the University of Rochester Medical Center.

In 1941, the dispensary was renamed the Eastman Dental Dispensary, and by 1965 it became the Eastman Dental Center, reflecting its growth as a hub for clinical service, training, and research.

A significant milestone came in 1997, when the Eastman Dental Center formally merged with the University of Rochester Medical Center (URMC) and the University of Rochester, aligning its programs in clinical care, graduate dental education, and research under the URMC umbrella.

In 2009, the institution was reorganized and renamed the Eastman Institute for Oral Health (EIOH). The change elevated its position within URMC, placing it on par with the Schools of Medicine and Nursing and Strong Memorial Hospital.

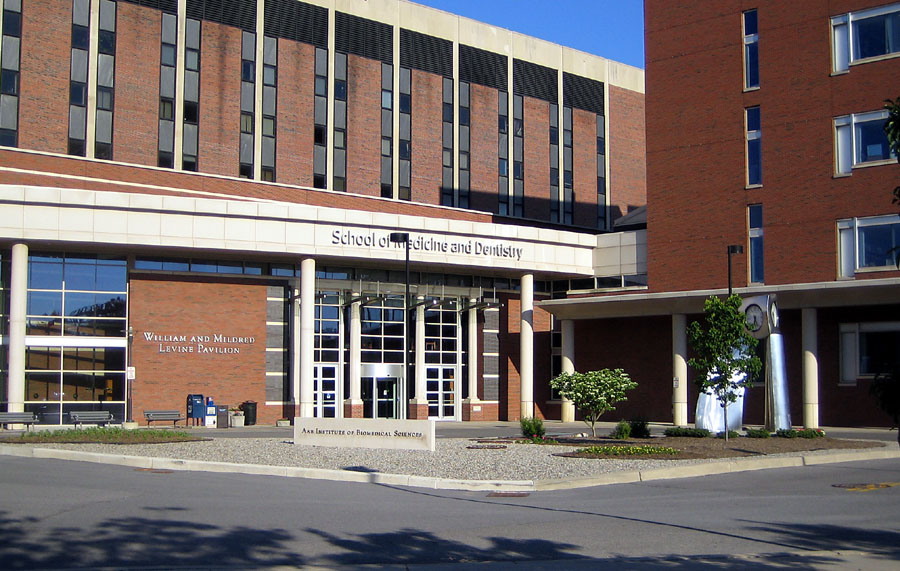
The entrance of the School of Medicine and Dentistry at the University of Rochester Medical Center

=== Timeline ===
Year	Name / Affiliation Change
1905	George Eastman funds first free dental clinics for children in Rochester
1917	Rochester Dental Dispensary opens with Eastman’s support; first dental hygiene class graduates
1941	Renamed Eastman Dental Dispensary
1965	Became Eastman Dental Center
1997	Fully integrated into the University of Rochester Medical Center
2009	Reorganized as Eastman Institute for Oral Health

== Programs and Specialties ==
University of Rochester Eastman Institute for Oral Health includes the following programs:

- Oral and Maxillofacial Surgery
- Orthodontics and Dentofacial Orthopedics
- Pediatric Dentistry
- Prosthodontics
- Periodontics
- Dental Public Health (DPH)
- General Practice Residency (GPR)
- Advanced Education in General Dentistry (AEGD)

== Notable work ==
In several landmark papers in the 1940s, Dr. Basil G. Bibby, D.M.D., Ph.D. was the first to demonstrate that fluoride plays a significant role in preventing dental caries.

In 1955, Dr. Michael Buonocore developed the foundations of dental bonding and adhesive dentistry with the "acid etch technique." Dr. Buonocore and colleagues published the first paper on the application of sealants to pits and fissures of developing adult teeth, today a widely used technique for caries prevention.

As an early pioneer, in 1984 the Eastman Institute for Oral Health was selected by Per-Ingvar Brånemark as one of the few US dental institutions to conduct trials on dental implants.

In 2016, the Eastman Institute for Oral Health was awarded the Gies Award for Achievement, Academic Dental Institution by the American Dental Education Association. The school has a Collaborative School-Based Dental Program that reaches over 10,000 underserved or underinsured children annually.

== Accreditation ==
University of Rochester Eastman Institute for Oral Health is accredited by the Commission on Dental Accreditation (CODA) of the American Dental Association (ADA).

== Notable alumni and faculty ==
- Finn Brudevold
- Lawrence A. Tabak
- Thomas Diekwisch
- Martha Somerman
- Gary Greenstein
- Bernadette Drummond
- Cecile Feldman
- George A. Freedman
- Harold Hodge toxicologist, first president of the Society of Toxicology
- Joseph F. Volker
- Lyndon F. Cooper, Dean of Virginia Commonwealth University School of Dentistry
- Hector L. Sarmiento
- Robert Burne
- John Featherstone
- William Calnon, president of the American Dental Association
- Esther Wilkins
- Erling Johansen, Dean Tufts University School of Dental Medicine 1978-1994 (longest serving dean)

== Institution Leadership ==
- Rudolph H. Hofheinz 1915 – 1916
- Harvey J. Burkhart 1916 – 1946
- Basil G. Bibby 1947 – 1970
- William D. McHugh 1970 – 1992
- Dennis H. Leverett (Acting Director) 1992 – 1992
- Ronald J. Billings 1992 – 1999
- Cyril Meyerowitz 1998 – 2013
- Eli Eliav 2013 – Present

== See also ==
- University of Rochester School of Medicine and Dentistry
- Eastman Dental Dispensary
- University of Rochester Medical Center
- Strong Memorial Hospital
