= Dennis P. Tarnow =

American dentist

Dennis Tarnow at the 2019 Columbia University alumni reception with one of his students at the New York Marriott Marquis, December 2019

Dennis Perry Tarnow (born May 28, 1946) is an American dentist specializing in periodontics, prosthodontics and implant dentistry and is known for his mark on dental implant research and education. He is currently director of implant dentistry at Columbia University College of Dental Medicine and former chairman of the department of periodontics and implant dentistry at New York University College of Dentistry. He is a sought after speaker on the subject of implant dentistry.

== Early years and education ==
Tarnow was born and raised in Brooklyn, New York to Joseph and Mildred Tarnow. After graduating from James Madison High School, he received his bachelor's degree in biology from Brooklyn College in 1968. He attended Camp Vacamas as a child and, later in life, volunteered his time for their Hands in 4 Youth programming for close to 40 years, both as an officer and as a board member.

Tarnow wanted to be a dentist because he liked working with his hands and was fond of his own dentist when growing up. He attended NYU College of Dentistry, graduating with his DDS in 1972. After a one-year GPR at Brookdale Hospital, he entered the postgraduate periodontics program at NYU, receiving his certificate in 1976. He then completed a postgraduate program in prosthodontics, also at NYU, receiving his certificate in 1978.

While in dental school, Tarnow held various jobs to help him afford tuition; he worked as a NYC taxi driver, a phlebotomist and a swim instructor.

Tarnow has a brother, Herman, who is a lawyer and who shares his time between NYC and Naples, Florida.

== Career ==
Tarnow is board certified in periodontics and practices at Synergistic Dentistry of New York (SDNY), formerly Tarnow, Fletcher, Zamzok & Smith, a joint specialty practice in Manhattan, since 1975.

Tarnow, who is a graduate of the New York University College of Dentistry, is a specialist in both periodontics and prosthodontics, and former chairman of the college’s Department of Periodontics and Implant Dentistry. He has written over 250 scientific papers and has co-authored or contributed chapters to several textbooks, including Aesthetic Restorative Dentistry and The Single Tooth Implant, which he co-authored with Dr. Stephen Chu, his partner at SDNY. Tarnow is a section editor for two peer reviewed dental journals and on the editorial review board of ten others. He has received the Master Clinician Award from the American Academy of Periodontology and in addition, has been named New York University’s Outstanding Teacher of the Year. The NYU College of Dentistry has named its periodontal and implant dentistry postgraduate clinical wing in his honor.

Tarnow has received many awards over his long and distinguished career, including:

- the American Academy of Esthetic Dentistry Charles L. Pincus / Ronald E. Goldman Lifetime Achievement Award in 2019
- the American College of Prosthodontists (ACP) Distinguished Lecturer Award in 2015
- the William J. Gies Award for outstanding contribution to the field of periodontology by the American Academy of Periodontology in 2005
- the 2017 Academic Excellence in Prosthodontics award from the Northeastern Gnathological Society
- the honorary Alumni Award from Columbia University College of Dental Medicine

He also received a 2005 award from the California Society of Periodontists for his outstanding contribution to the specialty of periodontists and personal commitment to the highest professional standards of dentistry.

Since May 1, 2010, Tarnow has been the director of implant education at Columbia University College of Dental Medicine.

== Personal life ==
Together with his wife Karen, Tarnow has a son named Derek.
