= Gary Greenstein =

American periodontist

Gary Greenstein is an American periodontist known for his scholarship and contribution to evidence-based periodontal and dental implant literature.

== Education and scholarship ==
Greenstein graduated from New York University College of Dentistry in 1972. He received his postgraduate periodontal training from the Eastman Dental Center in Rochester, New York, completing the program in 1980 and receiving a Masters' degree from the University of Rochester the following year. To maintain his scholarship at the highest level possible, Greenstein completed an implant fellowship in 2008 from NYU under the tutelage of Drs. Dennis Tarnow and John Cavallaro.

Greenstein has published over 130 articles related to periodontics and implant dentistry and is on the international lecture circuit.

== Career ==
Greenstein is a clinical professor of dental medicine at Columbia University College of Dental Medicine and maintains a private practice limited to periodontics and implant dentistry in Freehold, New Jersey.

Greenstein is the recipient of the following awards:

- The William J. Gies Award from the American Academy of Periodontology for contributions to literature in 1997
- The Hirschfeld Award in 2000 from Northeast Society of Periodontists
- The Fellowship Award in 2000 from American Academy of Periodontology
- The Distinguished Service Award 2010 from the American Academy of Periodontology
- The Gold Medal in 2018 from the American Academy of Periodontology. The highest award given by the Academy.
