= Tener Goodwin Veenema =

American nurse

- Born: Connecticut, USA
- Spouse: Kenneth R. Veenema (m. 1980)

Academic background
- Education: BSN, Mount Holyoke College; MSN, 1992, PhD, health services research and policy, 2001, University of Rochester Medical Center

Academic work
- Institutions: Johns Hopkins University

Tener Goodwin Veenema is an American nurse and a public health scientist. She is a Senior Scientist in the Department of International Health at the Johns Hopkins Bloomberg School of Public Health and a Contributing Scholar at the Johns Hopkins Center for Health Security. In 2021, Goodwin Veenema was elected as a Member of the National Academy of Medicine.

== Early life and education ==
Veenema was born to parents Susan Tener Goodwin and Jack C. Goodwin. Growing up, she attended Suffield Academy in Suffield, Connecticut. Upon graduating, she enrolled at Mount Holyoke College and was chosen as the "Miss Greater Enfield of 1978" at the Miss Enfield Scholarship Pageant. Following her undergraduate education, Goodwin Veenema received master’s degrees in nursing administration, pediatrics, and public health before earning her PhD in health services research and policy from the University of Rochester School of Medicine and Dentistry.

== Career ==
In 2013 Veenema joined the faculty at Johns Hopkins University. In 2013, she was named one of 32 recipients of the 2013 Florence Nightingale Medal as someone who had displayed "exceptional courage and devotion to the wounded, sick or disabled or to civilian victims of a conflict or disaster." Following this, she was promoted to associate professor at the Johns Hopkins University School of Nursing and joined the faculty of Johns Hopkins School of Public Health Center for Refugee and Disaster Response. As a result of her expertise, Veenema was chosen to help advise the Centers for Disease Control and Prevention (CDC) during the Western African Ebola virus epidemic. As an advisor to the CDC, she helped translate guidance into real-world training, cover screening methods, lab test standards, and the disposal of waste.

As a result of her expertise, Veenema was appointed to the 2015 Institute of Medicine (now referred to as the National Academy of Medicine) Standing Committee for the Centers for Disease Control and Prevention Division of Strategic National Stockpile. Following this, she accepted a Fulbright Scholarship while also serving as editor of the textbook Disaster Nursing and Emergency Preparedness for Chemical, Biological and Radiological Terrorism and Other Hazards. She was later selected to serve as the 2017–18 Distinguished Nurse Scholar-in-Residence at the National Academy of Medicine.

During the COVID-19 pandemic, Veenema served as Co-chair of Johns Hopkins' COVID-19 Health Care Worker Protection Rapid Research Group. In this role, she was principal investigator of a study exploring the mental health impact of COVID-19 on healthcare workers and hospital staff, and she led a workshop on effective infection containment and how to prepare and educate nursing and health care students who are newly entering the workforce. She was also appointed chair of the National Academy of Medicine Standing Committee for the CDC Center for Preparedness and Response. In 2021, Goodwin Veenema was named a Member of the National Academy of Medicine for being an "international expert in disaster nursing and public health emergency management."

== Personal life ==
Veenema married Kenneth Roy Veenema in 1980.

== Selected publications ==
The following is a list of selected publications:

- Disaster Nursing (2007)
- Disaster nursing and emergency preparedness for chemical, biological, and radiological terrorism, and other hazards (2019)
