= Mary E. Costanza =

American physician and researcher (born 1937)

Mary E. Costanza (born February 21, 1937) is a retired doctor and professor at the University of Massachusetts Amherst medical school. She is known for her research in the field of cancer, cancer prevention, and leadership of the American Cancer Society in Massachusetts.

== Education and career ==
Costanza has a B.A. from Radcliffe College (1958), an M.A. from the University of California, Berkeley (1963), and an M.D. from the University of Rochester School of Medicine (1968). She did an internship and residency in medicine at Tufts–New England Medical Center where she continued on to be a clinical fellow. Starting in 1970 she volunteered at a health clinic in Somerville, Massachusetts, an activity she retained until 1980. From 1980 until 1990 she was the director of oncology at the University of Massachusetts and its associated hospital. Starting in 1990 she led the High Risk Breast Cancer Clinic. She was a visiting scientist at the Dana-Farber Cancer Institute from 1989 to 1990. In 1995 she was named president of the Massachusetts American Cancer Society.

== Research ==
Costanza's early research was on the carcinoembryonic antigen as a screening tool for cancer. Her subsequent research compared outcomes of patients receiving different chemotherapy drug regimes and toxic effects from cancer drugs. Costanza has shared the pros and cons of different drug regimes used for breast cancer in The New York Times. Her later work centered on raising public awareness of breast cancer and working to improve implementation of screening for breast cancer, including large-scale studies on new drugs for prevention of breast cancer and the connection between weight and prevalence of breast cancer in women. She has researched the benefit of reminding women about the need for regular mammograms, and screening for colorectal cancer and prostate cancer.

== Selected publications ==
- Costanza, Mary E.; Pinn, Vivian; Schwartz, Robert S.; Nathanson, Larry (1973-09-06). "Carcinoembryonic Antigen-Antibody Complexes in a Patient with Colonic Carcinoma and Nephrotic Syndrome". New England Journal of Medicine. 289 (10): 520–522. doi:10.1056/NEJM197309062891007. ISSN 0028-4793. PMID 4579334.
- Costanza, Mary E. (1975-11-20). "The Problem of Breast-Cancer Prophylaxis". New England Journal of Medicine. 293 (21): 1095–1098. doi:10.1056/NEJM197511202932111. ISSN 0028-4793. PMID 1178027.
- Zapka, J G; Stoddard, A M; Costanza, M E; Greene, H L (1989-11-01). "Breast cancer screening by mammography: utilization and associated factors". American Journal of Public Health. 79 (11): 1499–1502. doi:10.2105/AJPH.79.11.1499. ISSN 0090-0036. PMC 1349800. PMID 2817160.
- Zapka, Jane G.; Stoddard, Anne; Maul, Leila; Costanza, Mary E. (1991). "Interval Adherence to Mammography Screening Guidelines". Medical Care. 29 (8): 697–707. doi:10.1097/00005650-199108000-00003. ISSN 0025-7079. JSTOR 3766098. PMID 1875738. S2CID 28514211.
- Smith, R. A.; Saslow, D.; Andrews Sawyer, K.; Burke, W.; Costanza, M. E.; Evans, W. P.; Foster, R. S.; Hendrick, E.; Eyre, H. J.; Sener, S. (2003-05-01). "American Cancer Society Guidelines for Breast Cancer Screening: Update 2003". CA: A Cancer Journal for Clinicians. 53 (3): 141–169. doi:10.3322/canjclin.53.3.141. ISSN 0007-9235. PMID 12809408. S2CID 1135423.
- Costanza, Mary E.; Luckmann, Roger; Stoddard, Anne M.; Avrunin, Jill S.; White, Mary Jo; Stark, Jennifer R.; Clemow, Lynn; Rosal, Milagros C. (2005-09-01). "Applying a stage model of behavior change to colon cancer screening". Preventive Medicine. 41 (3): 707–719. doi:10.1016/j.ypmed.2004.12.013. ISSN 0091-7435. PMID 16171854.

== Personal life ==
In 1994 Costanza was diagnosed with breast cancer and spoke with The Boston Globe about her personal decisions while being a patient.
