= Gabriel Pantelias =

Greek physicist, radiobiologist, and cytogeneticist

Gabriel E. Pantelias
- Born: March 20, 1950; Naxos, Greece
- Died: May 18, 2026 (aged 76); Athens, Greece
- Education: National and Kapodistrian University of Athens (BSc); University of Rochester (MSc, PhD)
- Known for: Premature chromosome condensation (PCC) technique G2-assay for radiosensitivity prediction
- Awards: Bacq and Alexander Award (2020); George V. Metzger Award (1984)
- Scientific career
- Fields: Radiobiology; Cytogenetics; Biological dosimetry
- Workplaces: National Centre for Scientific Research "Demokritos"

Gabriel E. Pantelias was a Greek radiobiologist and cytogeneticist known for his pioneering work in biological dosimetry, including the development of the premature chromosome condensation (PCC) assay and a standardized G2-assay for predicting individual radiosensitivity. He was an emeritus Director of Research at the Institute of Nuclear and Radiological Sciences, Technology, Energy & Safety (INRASTES) within the National Centre for Scientific Research "Demokritos" (NCSR Demokritos) in Athens, Greece. Pantelias authored over 110 peer-reviewed publications and received the Bacq and Alexander Award in 2020 from the European Radiation Research Society.

== Early life and education ==
Pantelias was born in Naxos, Greece. He earned a Bachelor of Science in Physics from the National and Kapodistrian University of Athens. He continued his studies in the United States, where he earned a Master's degree and a PhD in Radiobiology and Biophysics from the University of Rochester School of Medicine and Dentistry.

== Career ==
Pantelias worked as a postdoctoral researcher at the University of California in San Francisco (UCSF), and as Assistant Professor at the Department of Radiation Oncology and Nuclear Medicine at Thomas Jefferson University Hospital in Philadelphia. In 1986, he joined NCSR Demokritos, where he founded and directed the Health Physics, Radiobiology & Cytogenetics Laboratory until 2017. He held positions as Vice President of NCSR Demokritos, Director of the Institute of Radioisotopes & Radiodiagnostic Products, and Director of the Institute of Nuclear and Radiological Sciences, Technology, Energy & Safety (INRASTES) .

Pantelias served as a board member of the European Radiation Research Society from 2011 to 2017, and as a board member of the Greek Atomic Energy Commission from 2018 to 2020. He was an expert for the International Atomic Energy Agency (IAEA) on missions related to radiobiology, biodosimetry, and radiation protection. He served as a reviewer for international journals and as principal investigator on numerous European and national research projects.

== Research ==
Pantelias's research focused on the biological effects of ionizing radiation at the DNA, chromosomal, and cellular levels, including mechanisms of interaction, radiation-induced carcinogenesis, and chromothripsis (a catastrophic chromosome shattering event).

He developed the PCC assay (a fast way to see chromosome damage in non-dividing cells) using G0-blood lymphocytes for biological dosimetry (quick way to measure radiation dose from chromosome damage) and risk assessment in radiation accidents, enabling rapid dose estimation in large-scale emergencies.

He also created a standardized G2-assay (a test to predict how sensitive someone is to radiation) for predicting individual radiosensitivity.

His work explored chromosome breakage, repair, and rearrangement; conversion of DNA damage into chromatid breaks; formation of chromosomal aberrations at various cell cycle stages; effects of different radiation qualities (including high-LET); non-targeted effects; genomic instability; and biomarkers for biodosimetry.

Some of his studies focused on using PCC to unravel chromothripsis origins and fingerprints of high-LET irradiation.

Pantelias published over 110 peer-reviewed articles and contributed to more than 170 international conference proceedings, with over 3,300 citations.

== Awards and recognition ==
Pantelias received the George V. Metzger Award in 1984 from the Department of Biochemistry & Biophysics at the University of Rochester. He also received the Bacq and Alexander Award from the European Radiation Research Society in 2020 for his contributions to radiobiological sciences and radiation cytogenetics. He was awarded several scholarships, fellowships, honorary prizes, and distinctions for his education and scientific achievements.

== Selected publications ==
- Terzoudi GI, Pantelias GE (2020). "Interphase Cytogenetic Analysis of G0 Lymphocytes Exposed to α-Particles, C-Ions, and Protons Reveals their Enhanced Effectiveness for Localized Chromosome Shattering—A Critical Risk for Chromothripsis". Cancers. 12(9):2336.
- Terzoudi GI, Pantelias GE (2019). "Use of human lymphocyte G0 PCCs to detect intra- and inter-chromosomal aberrations for early radiation biodosimetry and retrospective assessment of radiation-induced effects". PLOS ONE. 14(5):e0216081.
- Kulka U, et al. (2017). "RENEB – Running the European Network of biological dosimetry and physical retrospective dosimetry". International Journal of Radiation Biology. 93(1):2–14.
- Terzoudi GI, et al. (2015). "Stress induced by premature chromatin condensation triggers chromosome shattering and chromothripsis at DNA sites still replicating in micronuclei or multinucleate cells when primary nuclei enter mitosis". Mutation Research/Genetic Toxicology and Environmental Mutagenesis. 793:185–198.
- Pantelias GE, Terzoudi GI (2011). "A standardized G2-assay for the prediction of individual radiosensitivity". Radiotherapy and Oncology. 101(1):28–34.
- Pantelias GE, Maillie HD (1984). "The use of peripheral blood mononuclear cell prematurely condensed chromosomes for biological dosimetry". Radiation Research. 99(1):140–150.
