= Frederick Bieber =

Canadian-American geneticist

Frederick Robert Bieber
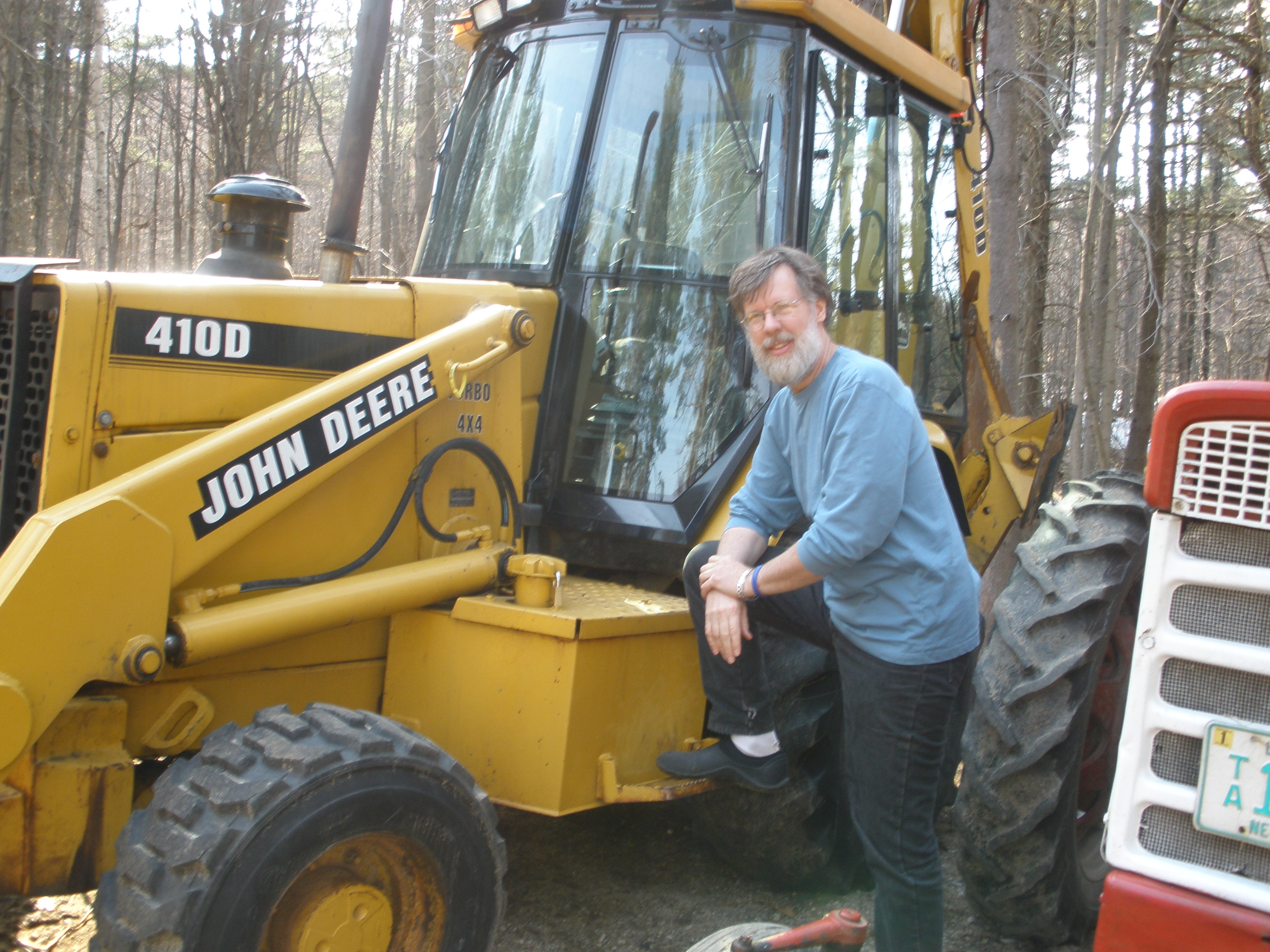
- Bieber at MoonGlo Farm
- Born: December 31, 1960 (age 65); Regina, Saskatchewan, Canada
- Education: State University of New York; University of Rochester School of Medicine; Medical College of Virginia
- Known for: medical genetics forensic genetics
- Scientific career
- Fields: Pathology, genetics
- Workplaces: University of Rochester; Harvard Medical School; Brigham and Women's Hospital; Massachusetts General Hospital; Children's Hospital Boston

Frederick Robert Bieber (born December 31, 1960) is a Canadian-American geneticist currently serving as Senior Medical Geneticist at Brigham and Women's Hospital, a member of the Faculty of Medicine at Harvard University, and a Consultant at the Massachusetts General Hospital and the Children's Hospital Boston.

== Early years and academic career ==
Born in Canada, Bieber spent his early years in Strasbourg, Saskatchewan, a small prairie wheat farming community about 75 km N of Regina. He is the son of a World War II veteran of the Royal Canadian Air Force who studied engineering at the University of Toronto, and a nurse who studied in Hamilton, Ontario. During his childhood in Strasbourg he developed a lifelong love of animals and the outdoors, and a near-obsession with farm equipment, especially farm tractors.

When his family later emigrated to Rochester, New York, he completed pre-college studies there and in Buenos Aires, Argentina. He attended public schools in Rochester, was selected as the Standard Bearer of the Abelard Reynolds No. 42 School, and is an alumnus of Charlotte High School (Rochester, New York) and of Colegio Ward in Buenos Aires, Argentina. He was active in sports and music in high school and college where developed an interest in genetics during his studies of ethics and mathematics.

During his undergraduate studies at the State University of New York at Oswego, he spent a summer in research with Dr. Thomas H. Roderick at The Jackson Laboratory in Bar Harbor, Maine where he decided that further studies in human genetics would provide an opportunity to make contributions to genetics without having to perform research on experimental animals. While a student at the University of Rochester School of Medicine, he became interested in researching the genetics of hearing loss after recognizing that deafness and hearing disorders was one of the few phenotypes for which positive assortative mating was common.

He then moved to the Medical College of Virginia (MCV) in Richmond, Virginia to work with Walter Nance, the preeminent geneticist/clinician working in this area under whose mentorship he earned a doctorate in human genetics. His doctoral research on the genetics of profound childhood utilized data from families with students attending the Maryland School for the Deaf in Frederick, Maryland.

During his doctoral studies at MCV, he developed broader interests in medical genetics, specifically the genetics of human maldevelopment and he published a paper in Science announcing the first description of polar body twinning in man. Upon completion of doctoral work he moved to Boston to commence a research fellowship at the Massachusetts General Hospital under the supervision of Lewis Ball Holmes and Shirley Driscoll. He joined the Faculty of Medicine at Harvard in 1983.

His academic work, based in the Department of Pathology at the Brigham and Women's Hospital, is focused on medical genetics, clinical cytogenetics, and forensic medicine. He has participated in the publication of over 100 articles and books on these subjects, and co-authored the acclaimed book "The Malformed Fetus and Stillbirth".

Bieber joined the Faculty of Medicine at Harvard University in 1983 and is based at Harvard Medical School where he received a teaching award in 2003. He has also taught courses at Harvard College and the Harvard Extension School. He has delivered over 200 invited addresses at various universities and has served as a visiting professor at St. George's University in Grenada and at the National Autonomous University of Mexico (UNAM) in Cuernavaca.

== National and International service ==
Bieber was an appointed member of the World Trade Center Kinship and Data Analysis Panel (KADAP), assisting the New York City Office of the Chief Medical Examiner with the DNA-based identification of victims of the September 11, 2001 attacks on the twin towers. He participated in the identification of victims of Hurricanes Katrina and Rita, assisting the Louisiana coroners office, as a member of the Hurricane Victims DNA Identification Expert Group (HVDIEG).

He has served as a consultant to many public safety agencies relating to human identification and forensic genetics, including the FBI DNA Advisory Board, the advisory board of the National DNA Databank of Canada, the Virginia Department of Forensic Science, and the DNA Subcommittee of the New York State Forensic Commission. In recognition of these contributions he received awards and recognitions from the Massachusetts House of Representatives, the Massachusetts District Attorneys Association, the Massachusetts State Police, the U.S. Department of Justice, the Federal Bureau of Investigation and the State of Louisiana. In 2013 he was appointed during the Obama Administration as a Commissioner to the National Commission on Forensic Science in the US Department of Justice. On June 24, 2018, Bieber was honored by an appointment, by HRH Queen Elizabeth II, to the Venerable Order of St John.

== Military service ==
In 2001, Bieber received a Direct Presidential Commission as a Captain (O-3) in the Medical Service Corps of the United States Army Reserve and completed officer basic training at Fort Sam Houston and Camp Bullis in San Antonio, Texas. He served on active duty with both the Criminal Investigation Division (CID) at the United States Army Criminal Investigation Laboratory (USACIL) and with the Armed Forces DNA Identification Laboratory (AFDIL) of the Office of the Armed Forces Medical Examiner (OAFME) in the Army Medical Department (AMEDD). In 2006 he was selected for promotion to the rank of Major (O-4). He received an Honorable Discharge in 2010.

== Other activities ==
His non-academic pursuits include forestry and wildlife management, animal welfare and greyhound adoption (Board of Directors, Greyhound Friends, Inc.), automobile racing (competition drivers license), and adventure travel.

== References and sources ==
- He Helps Disaster Victims Reclaim Identity, Boston Globe 12 December 2005
- Catching Criminals Thru their Relatives' DNA, Harvard University Gazette, June 11, 2006
