= Nadelson =

Nadelson is a surname. Notable people with the surname include:

- Carol Nadelson (born 1936), American psychiatrist
- Reggie Nadelson, American novelist
