= Robert Rey (plastic surgeon) =

Brazilian-American plastic surgeon

Roberto M. Rey Jr.
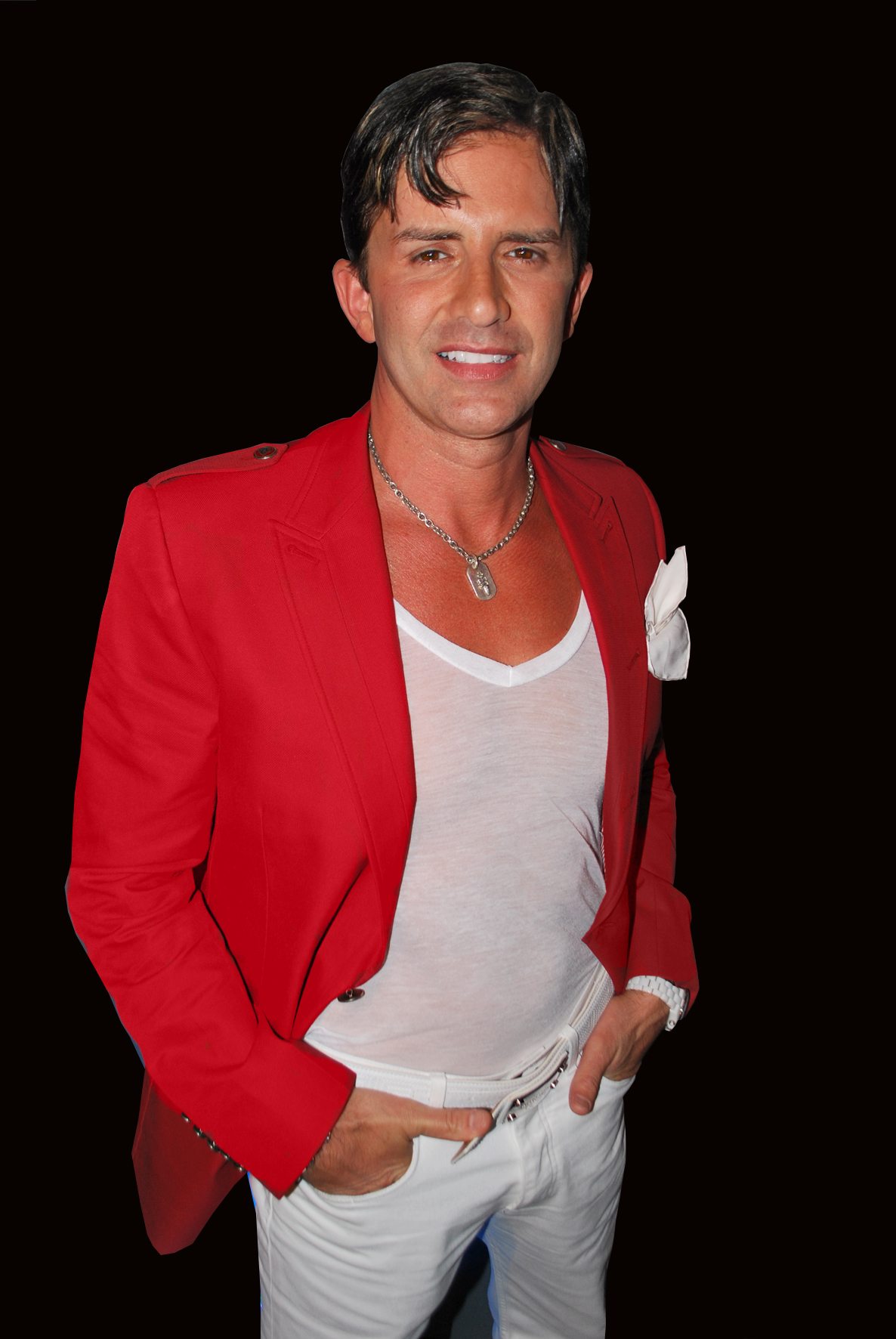

Personal details
- Born: Roberto Miguel Rey Júnior; October 1, 1961 (age 65) São Paulo, Brazil
- Party: PODE (2020–present)
- Other political affiliations: PSC (2013–15); Patriota (2015–18); Republicanos (2018–20)
- Spouse: Hayley Rey (m. 2000)
- Children: 2
- Education: Arizona State University (BA); Harvard University (MPP); Tufts University (MD)
- Occupation: Plastic surgeon, TV presenter
- Website: drrobertrey.com

Roberto Miguel Rey Júnior (born October 1, 1961), known as Dr. Robert Rey, is a Brazilian American plastic surgeon. He was featured on the E! reality series Dr. 90210. Rey has appeared on many TV shows as a medical correspondent, including The View and Good Morning America, he has contributed to The New York Times and appeared on the cover of Forbes Brazil.

== Biography ==
Roberto Miguel Rey Júnior was born in São Paulo, Brazil to engineer Roberto Miguel Rey, an American-born (of Mexican descent) naturalized Brazilian and Avelina Reisdörfer, a Brazilian of German descent.

Rey was raised by a single mother in São Paulo. He told a New York Times reporter that he spent his youth running with a crowd of teenage hoodlums and committing petty crimes. The family were poor all through his childhood. He said he slept on sleeping bags on a broken dining room table. But he explained that his dream of coming to America and becoming a doctor gave him determination to make it come true. "Walking through the ghetto I was raised in, I knew I was going to go to the United States, go to Harvard, be a plastic surgeon, move to Beverly Hills, become a member of Congress and then become surgeon general," he said.

Invited by writer Orson Scott Card, who at the time was a Mormon missionary in Brazil, to live in the United States, he and his three siblings took up the offer. They moved to Utah in 1974, when he was 12. In Utah and later, when he and his siblings lived on a ranch in Arizona, Rey said, he was "a nerd" who studied almost all the time. But he also acted in television commercials to earn the money for school.

== Education ==
Rey earned a Bachelor of Arts degree from Arizona State University in Chemistry, a master's degree in Public Policy from Harvard University and a Doctor of Medicine (MD) from Tufts University School of Medicine.

Rey completed a 3-year general surgery residency at Harbor UCLA, and a plastic & reconstructive surgery residency at the University of Tennessee-Memphis Health Science Center. He subsequently undertook an aesthetic and breast reconstruction fellowship at the Harvard Medical School's Beth Israel Deaconess Medical Center in Boston. He is licensed to practice medicine in the states of California and Florida. He is a member of The Los Angeles Medical Association and American Medical Association, and is on staff at Cedars Sinai Hospital and the chief medical director of Beverly Hills Plastic Surgeons (BHPS), a multi location plastic surgery group with affiliated surgeons across the United States.

== Television ==
Rey has appeared on TV shows, including The View, The Today Show, Good Morning America, Dr. Phil. He had a weekly casebook article in Life and Style Magazine.

In 2004, Rey, along with Jason Diamond, co-starred in the reality show Dr. 90210, a program that showcases their surgeon's practices, the surgeries and patients, as well as his family life. Rey has performed plastic surgery on celebrity patients, one of which (John Travolta's niece's breast augmentation procedure) was featured in an episode of Dr. 90210.

Mark L. Jewell, the president of the American Society for Aesthetic Plastic Surgery, said: "Dr. Rey is a skilled surgeon, but his informal way with patients is inappropriate, even undignified, and the reality show gives viewers the impression that plastic surgery is a casual beauty treatment rather than a serious surgical procedure".

Other plastic surgeons acknowledge Rey has made their specialty seem more user-friendly to a mass audience. "The program shows that plastic surgery can have a profound positive impact on people's lives", said Dr. Thomas C. Cochran Jr., an assistant clinical professor of surgery at Harvard Medical School, who taught Rey during his aesthetic fellowship. "The good points are that you see an authentic interview process, preop consultation and postoperative recovery. The rest is just show business."

== Personal life ==
Rey and his Quebec-born wife, Hayley, have two children. They live in Beverly Hills, California.
