= John Cavallaro =

American prosthodontist

John Cavallaro Jr. is an American prosthodontist well known for his scholarship and overall contribution to evidence-based periodontal and dental implant literature.

== Education and scholarship ==
Cavallaro graduated from New York University College of Dentistry in 1982. He then completed a general practice residency at the Manhattan Veterans Administration in 1986, followed by certificate in prosthodontics from NYU in 1990. He then completed a fellowship in implant dentistry at NYU College of Dentistry in 2002.

== Career ==
Cavallaro is a clinical professor of prosthodontics and implant dentistry at Columbia University College of Dental Medicine and maintains a private practice limited to prosthodontics and implant dentistry in Brooklyn, New York.

Cavallaro received the Eugene Rothschild Memorial Award for Excellence in Fixed Prosthodontics from the Academy of Oral Rehabilitation at NYU.
