= Lyndon F. Cooper =

American clinical scientist

- Occupations: Prosthodontist, researcher, administrator
- Known for: immunomodulation of bone regeneration, clinical evaluation of dental implant therapies

Academic background
- Education: DDS, Cert. Prosthdontics, PhD, FACP
- Alma mater: Hobart College, New York University, University of Rochester, NIH
- Doctoral advisor: Lawrence A. Tabak

Lyndon F. Cooper is an American clinician scientist and prosthodontist. He is the former dean of Virginia Commonwealth University School of Dentistry, a position he held starting in 2022 until 2026.

He has published over 200 peer-reviewed publications with an h-index of 71 and contributed to 17 book chapters.

== Early life and education ==
Lyndon Cooper obtained his DDS degree from New York University in 1983 after having completed an undergraduate degree at Hobart College. He completed a General Practice Residency at Long Island Jewish Medical Center (Hillside) in 1984, followed by a fellowship in Oral Biology at Eastman Dental Center in 1985. Following completion of the Dentist Scientist Program at the Eastman Dental Center, he completed a Ph.D. in the Department of Biochemistry at University of Rochester and a certificate in Prosthodontics in 1990. He completed a post-doctoral fellowship at the NIH in 1992.

== Career ==
Cooper held the position of program director of advanced prosthodontics, chair of the Prosthodontics Department, and Stallings Distinguished Professor at University of North Carolina at Chapel Hill School of Dentistry. He also served as the dean for research and head of the Department of Oral Biology at the University of Illinois Chicago School of Dentistry.
