= Golisano Children's Hospital =

Golisano Children's Hospital can refer to five different unaffiliated children's hospitals in the United States.

- Golisano Children's Hospital of Buffalo, New York, United States
- Golisano Children's Hospital (Rochester), New York, United States
- Upstate Golisano Children's Hospital, Syracuse, New York, United States
- Golisano Children's Hospital of Southwest Florida, Naples, Florida, United States
- Golisano Children's Hospital at UK, Lexington, Kentucky, United States
