= John Featherstone (dentist) =

New Zealand dental researcher and academic

John D. B. Featherstone
- Born: New Zealand
- Education: Victoria University of Wellington; University of Manchester
- Known for: Development of Caries Management by Risk Assessment (CAMBRA)
- Awards: American Dental Association Distinguished Service Award (2023); American Dental Association Norton M. Ross Award for Excellence in Clinical Research (2007)
- Scientific career
- Fields: Dentistry, Cariology, laser dentistry
- Workplaces: University of California, San Francisco; Eastman Dental Center, University of Rochester

John D. B. Featherstone is a New Zealand dental researcher, educator, and academic administrator.

He is professor emeritus of Preventive and Restorative Dental Sciences at the University of California, San Francisco (UCSF) School of Dentistry, where he served as Dean from 2008 to 2017. Internationally recognized for his research on dental caries and fluoride, Featherstone is best known as one of the developers of Caries Management by Risk Assessment (CAMBRA), a model widely adopted in preventive dentistry.

== Early life and education ==
Featherstone grew up in a small town in New Zealand, where he pursued a bachelor's of science degree in chemistry and mathematics at Victoria University of Wellington. He then earned an M.Sc. in physical chemistry from the University of Manchester in the UK. In 1977, he completed his Ph.D. in chemistry at Victoria University of Wellington with a dissertation on the chemical aspects of dental caries.

== Academic career ==
Featherstone presented his doctoral research on dental caries chemistry at the International Association for Dental Research annual meeting in 1977, which led to his recruitment by the Eastman Dental Center at the University of Rochester. There, from 1980 to 1995, he served as Professor and Head of the Center for Oral Biology, fostering interdisciplinary research in cariology, fluoride physiology, and tooth remineralization.

In 1995, Featherstone joined UCSF as a professor and became Chair of the Department of Preventive and Restorative Dental Sciences (1996–2005), later serving as interim dean beginning in 2007 before his appointment as dean in 2008.

== Research contributions ==
Featherstone's research integrated chemistry, microbiology, and clinical dentistry. He elucidated mechanisms of de- and remineralization in enamel, advanced understanding of fluoride's role in preventing caries, and developed the evidence-based CAMBRA model for personalized caries management. His work has had a significant influence on preventive and restorative dentistry worldwide.

== Honors and awards ==
In 2007, Featherstone received the American Dental Association’s Norton M. Ross Award for Excellence in Clinical Research, recognizing his lifetime contributions to evidence-based dentistry.

In 2023, he was honored with the ADA's Distinguished Service Award, the organization's highest honor, for his impact on dental science and education.

Throughout his career, he has also been honored with awards such as the IADR Distinguished Scientist Award, the Yngve Ericsson Prize, the Zsolnai Prize, the Academy of Laser Dentistry's T.H. Maiman Award, and a Lifetime Achievement Medal from Alpha Omega International Dental Organization.

== Personal life ==
Featherstone resides in San Francisco, California, where he continues to engage in research and global outreach as a professor emeritus.

== See also ==
- University of California, San Francisco School of Dentistry
- University of Rochester
- Eastman Institute for Oral Health
- Caries Management by Risk Assessment (CAMBRA)
