= Diekwisch =

Diekwisch is a German surname. Notable people with the surname include:

- Erwin Diekwisch (1920–2013), German Luftwaffe pilot
- Thomas Diekwisch (born 1961), German-American scientist
