= Strong Memorial Hospital =

Coordinates: 43.1228°N 77.6244°W

Geography
- Location: Rochester, New York, U.S.

Organisation
- Care system: Medicare
- Type: Teaching
- Affiliated university: University of Rochester Medical Center

Services
- Emergency department: Level I trauma center
- Beds: 886
- Speciality: Cancer, Cardiology, Neuromedicine, Orthopaedics, Pediatrics

History
- Founded: 1926

Links
- Website: strong.urmc.edu

Strong Memorial Hospital (SMH) is an 886-bed medical facility, part of the University of Rochester Medical Center complex, in Rochester, New York, United States. Opened in 1926, it is a major provider of both in-patient and out-patient medical services. Attached to Strong is the 190-bed Golisano Children's Hospital, which serves infants, children, teens, and young adults aged 0–21.

Strong is owned and operated by the University of Rochester and serves as its primary teaching hospital. It offers programs toward medical, dental, or graduate degrees through the University of Rochester School of Medicine and Dentistry. The hospital anchors the University's health care delivery network in the Rochester area and serves as a primary community hospital and a regional trauma center for the Rochester area.

The facility opened initially as a medical school in 1925, with the hospital proper opening shortly thereafter. It began as a 250-bed teaching hospital.

In Brockport, New York, there is UR Strong West, which is an ER/Outpatient facility which is a division of Strong Memorial Hospital.

== Human experimentation ==
From 1945 to 1947, Strong was the site of non-consensual human experimentation programs under supervision of the Manhattan Project and its successor, the United States Atomic Energy Commission. A building adjacent to the hospital and connected to it via tunnel, dubbed the "Manhattan Annex," was constructed in 1943 as a field office for the Manhattan Project. Over a period of two years starting in 1945, a total of seventeen patients admitted to Strong for unrelated ailments were injected with a plutonium or uranium solution without their knowledge. The Atomic Energy Commission tracked the patients for the rest of their lives; after their deaths, the Commission exhumed their remains for testing. Surviving patients were later informed of the true nature of the experiments in 1974.

== See also ==
- Eastman Institute for Oral Health
