= Julian Earls =

American physicist (born 1942)

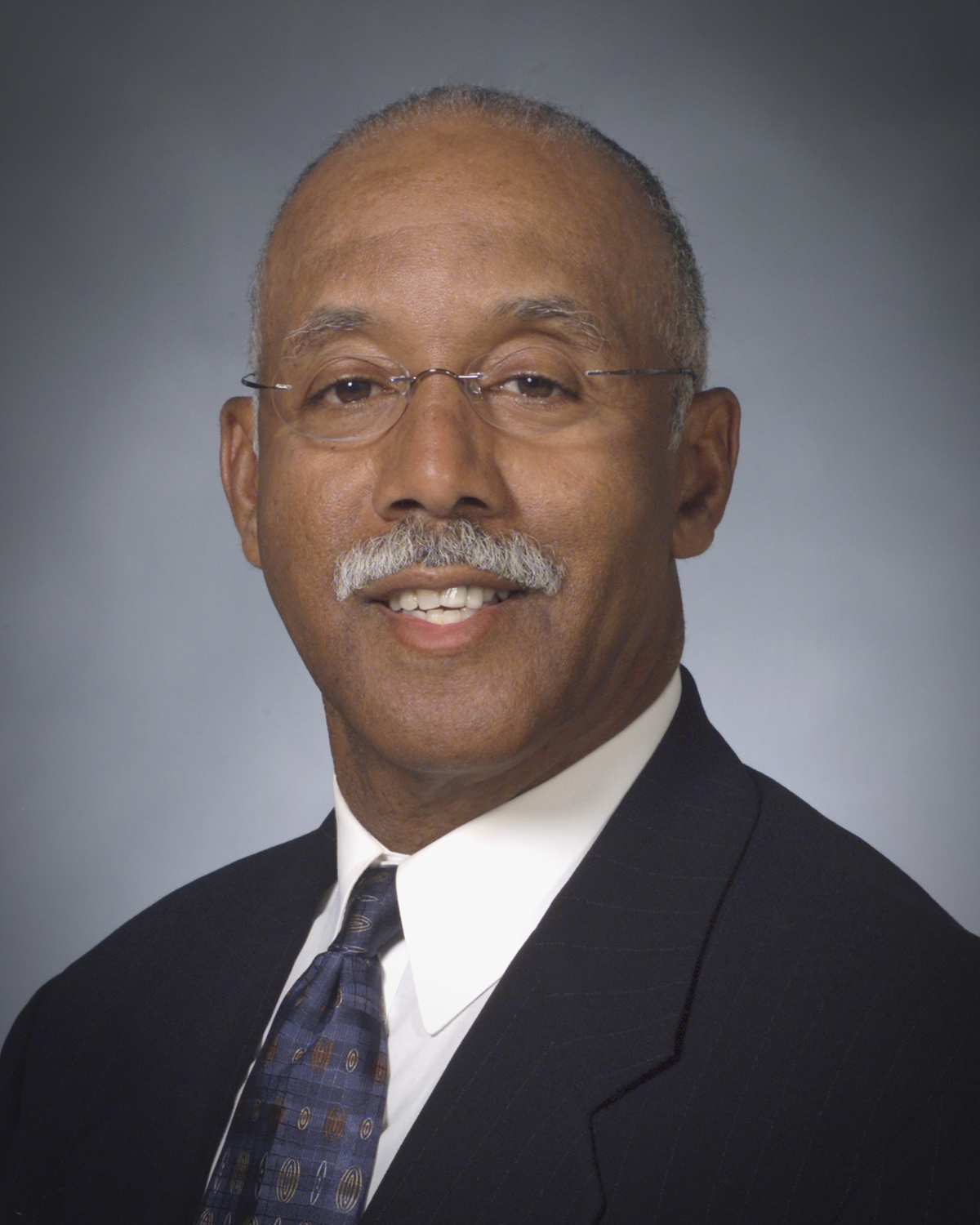
- Earls in 2016
- Born: November 22, 1942 (age 83); Portsmouth, Virginia, US
- Education: Norfolk State University; University of Rochester; University of Michigan; Harvard University
- Awards: NASA Exceptional Achievement Medal
- Scientific career
- Workplaces: NASA
- Thesis: Radiation protection guides for long range space missions; Radiological health aspects of fabricating operations with thoriated metals. (1975)

Julian Manly Earls (born November 22, 1942) is an American physicist who worked for NASA for over forty years. He has been awarded two NASA Exceptional Achievement Medals and was inducted into the Presidential Rank Award of the Senior Executive Service by both Bill Clinton and George Bush.

== Early life and education ==
Earls was born on November 22, 1942, in Portsmouth, Virginia to Ida and James Deberry Earls. His mother was a seamstress and his father worked on the railroads. His parents and first grade teacher encouraged him to work hard at school. He attended Crestwood High School in Chesapeake, Virginia. He took part in mathematics and science fairs whilst at high school, and was the first in his family to attend college. Earls studied physics at Norfolk State University, since the institution did not have an engineering study program available. He earned a bachelor's degree in 1964. He was initiated into Kappa Alpha Psi in 1963. He was encouraged to attend graduate school and applied to the University of Rochester School of Medicine, and completed a master's degree radiation biology in 1965. In the same year Earls began his career at NASA.

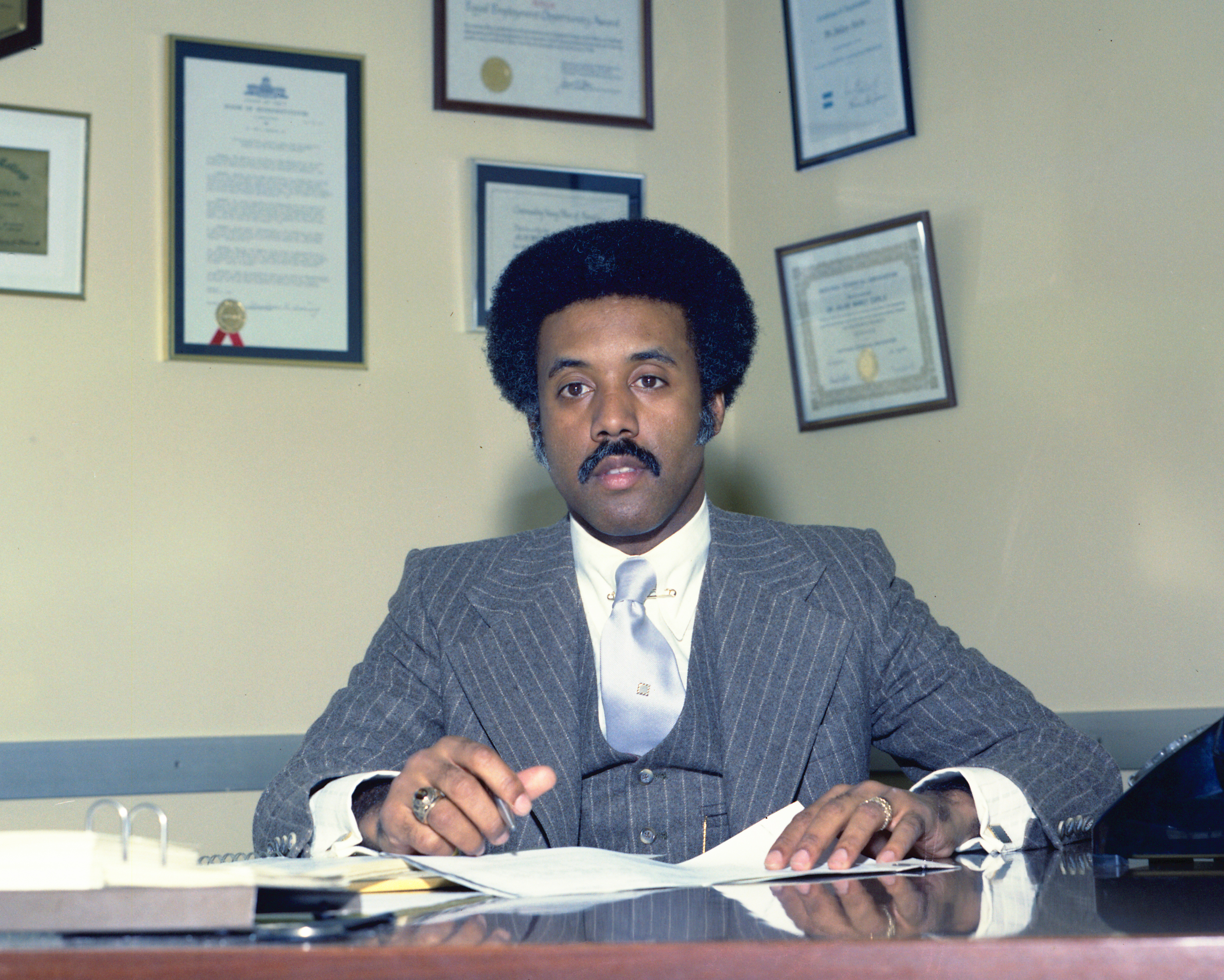
Earls at NASA in 1976

After graduating he spent a summer at the Brookhaven National Laboratory. He was appointed as a medical physicist at the Lewis Research Center, who supported Earls in earning a doctoral degree in radiation physics at the University of Michigan. He was made Head of the section on Health Physics and Licensing, and served as the Radiological Safety Officer. In 1983, Earls founded the Development Fund for Black Students in Science and Technology, an endowment that provides financial support to black students at historically black colleges and universities.

== Research and career ==
Earl's left NASA for a brief moment in 1968 to work for the Atomic Energy Commission. When he returned he became the head of Lewis' Health Physics and Licensing Section.After earning his doctorate Earls returned to NASA, where he worked in Health Physics whilst simultaneously working toward a business degree at Harvard University. Earls was appointed Chief of Nasa's Environmental Health Office in 1972. He was made Chief of the Health, Safety, and Security Division in 1983 and promoted to Director of the Office of Health and Services in 1988. Earls was made assistant deputy director for Business Resources Development in 1992, where he focused on enhancing relationships with minority universities and businesses. He was made the Director of the Glenn Research Center in 2003, where he was responsible for technology, research and development, and systems development. This role involved Earls managing a budget of over a billion dollars and a work force of 4,500. He was part of the launch team for Apollo 13 lunar program.

During his career at NASA Earls held many 'firsts', which included being the first African-American man to be appointed section head, office chief, division chief and deputy director. Earls wrote the two first NASA health physics and environmental resource guides. He also taught mathematics, physics and radiation biology at Capital University. He was also part of the first class of NASA Glenn Research inductees, being the second person ever to be inducted, in honor of NASA's 100th anniversary.

In 2005, after a career spanning forty years, Earls retired from NASA. After his retirement Earls joined Cleveland State University as Executive in Residence. Apart from the latter role, Earls vastly contributed to the Cleveland State University community, serving as provisional Vice President of Civic Engagement and providing special advisory services to two presidents of the university. The Alabama A&M University appointed Earls to the Board of Trustees in 2005. He also serves on the Board of Directors of ANSER. Earls worked for Cleveland State University from 2006 to 2019. Additionally, he served on the Science and Mathematics Education Policy Advisory Council in Ohio as a co-chair representative

=== Awards and honours ===
His awards and honours include:

- 1988 National Black College Alumni Hall of Fame Inductee
- 1999 Inducted into the Senior Executive Service by Bill Clinton
- 2004 1999 Inducted into the Senior Executive Service by George W. Bush
- 2005 NASA Exceptional Achievement Medal
- 2007 Howard University Honorary Degree
- 2015 Cleveland State University Honorary Doctorate
- 2016 NASA Glenn Research Center Inductee
- 2017 Kappa Alpha Psi Laurel Wreath

Earls holds several honorary degrees, including a doctorate of science from the Vaughn College of Aeronautics and Technology, a degree in pedagogy from Nova Southeastern University and an honorary degree in humane letters from North Carolina A&T State University. The Dr. Julian M. Earls College Scholarship is awarded annually by the National Technical Association. Earl has also received the NASA Outstanding Leadership Medal.

== Personal life ==
Earls is married to Zenobia, a Cleveland public school teacher, with whom he has two sons. Julian Earls Jr., who is a neurologist, and Gregory Earls, a filmmaker who lives in Inglewood, California. Dr. Earls has two granddaughters. Earls is an athlete who has completed 27 marathons. In 2002, he was a torch bearer for the Salt Lake City Olympic Games.
