= Porter W. Anderson Jr. =

American microbiologist

Porter Warren Anderson Jr. (born January 1, 1937) is an American microbiologist and professor emeritus at University of Rochester School of Medicine and Dentistry best known for developing a vaccine that protects children from infections by Haemophilus influenzae type b (Hib), a leading cause of bacterial meningitis and epiglottitis. The techniques he and his colleague Ronald Eby invented were later utilized to develop a vaccine against Streptococcus pneumoniae. He is a member of the National Academy of Sciences of the United States of America.

== Early life and education ==
Anderson was born on January 1, 1937, in Corinth, MS to Mary Rogers Anderson and Porter Warren Anderson. He was raised around Montgomery, AL where his sister Sarah was born in 1941. His father was the superintendent of the Buckeye Cotton Oil Co.

He graduated from Sidney Lanier High School in 1954. He earned a Bachelor of Arts degree in chemistry from Emory University in Atlanta, GA, winning a Woodrow Wilson Fellowship for post-graduate study. Before graduate study he worked for United Fruit Co. as an agricultural chemist in Honduras. He began graduate work at Harvard in 1961 and earned his Master of Arts in 1962 and Doctor of Philosophy under the advisement of Bernard Davis in bacteriology in 1967. His dissertation is titled, “Biochemical and genetic studies with spectinomycin in Escherichia coli.”

== Academic appointments ==
Anderson taught at Stillman College in Tuscaloosa, AL from 1966 to 1968. He then returned to Harvard Medical School and in 1972 became Assistant and subsequently Associate Professor in the Department of Microbiology and Molecular Genetics. In 1977 he moved to the University of Rochester School of Medicine and Dentistry as Associate, then full Professor of Pediatrics and Microbiology, where he is currently Emeritus Professor. In 2006 he was appointed Senior Lecturer at Harvard Medical School.

== Vaccine work ==
At Boston Children's Hospital in 1968 Anderson began vaccine research to prevent Hib disease along with David H. Smith and Richard Insel. Because animal tests of their first vaccine - a purified polysaccharide - were inconclusive, Anderson and his colleagues tested the vaccines on themselves, finding a useful antibody response. Clinical trials in Finland demonstrated the vaccine's effectiveness in children, but not in infants. This vaccine was approved for use in 1986.

After moving to the University of Rochester they developed a polysaccharide conjugate vaccine that worked in infants, too. This vaccine – and alternative versions thereafter developed - became a part of standard childhood immunization regimens in 1990 and has been credited with reducing Hib disease by 99%.

The conjugate vaccine technique Anderson and his colleagues developed led to a Streptococcus pneumoniae (pneumococcus) vaccine that was introduced in developed countries 2000. Anderson continues to perform research on the development of an inexpensive pneumococcal vaccine for third world countries with colleague Richard Malley at Boston Children's Hospital.

== Patents ==
Anderson holds 9 issued patents and has three patent applications pending: US4396023, US4673574, US4808700, US5360897, US4761283, US4762713, US4220717, US4496538, US5656480, US20070178561, US20080193475, US20020077284.

== Honors and awards ==
- 1996: Albert Lasker Clinical Medical Research Award, shared with Smith and with Rachel Schneerson and John Robbins of the National Institutes of Health
- 1996: Pasteur Award
- 2010: Member of the National Academy of Sciences of the United States of America
- 2011: Fellow of the American Academy of Microbiology
- 2018: Prince Mahidol Award for the year 2017 in the field of Public Health

== Civil rights and philanthropic work ==
Anderson's motivation to teach at Stillman College, an historically black institution, was in part motivated by his desire to participate in the civil rights movement. While there he helped to raise funds for the West Alabama Support Project. In 1968 Anderson was a part of an interracial protest delegation at the Democratic National Convention in Chicago. In 2001 he provided the initial funding for the Anderson-Rogers Foundation, Inc. which makes grants to support a variety of social and environmental needs. Anderson served on a panel of the World Health Organization's Global Programme on Vaccines from 1991-4; on the board of trustees of the Marine Biological Laboratory in Woods Hole, MA from 1996 to 2005; and as an advisor to the Center for Disease Control's Anthrax Vaccine Program in 2002. He continues to volunteer his time toward the development of affordable vaccines for pneumococcal diseases.

== Non-science interests ==
Anderson has played tennis since college and is a classical pianist.
