= Dr. 90210 =

American reality television series

- Created by: Rick Leed; Donald Bull
- Starring: Dr. Robert Rey; Dr. Jason Diamond; Dr. David Matlock; Dr. Linda Li; Dr. Will Kirby; Dr. Gary Motykie; Dr. Kelly Killeen; Dr. Michelle Lee; Dr. Cat Begovic; Dr. Suzanne Quardt
- Country of origin: United States
- Original language: English
- No. of seasons: 7
- No. of episodes: 75

Production
- Executive producers: Donald Bull; Tara Long; Mark Herwick; Lori Gordon; Benjamin Megargel
- Running time: 44 minutes

Original release
- Network: E!
- Release: July 11, 2004 – November 16, 2020

Dr. 90210 is an American reality television series focusing on plastic surgery in the wealthy suburb of Beverly Hills, California. The series ran for six seasons from 2004 to 2008 on E!. Dr. 90210 gets its name from the ZIP code of the core of Beverly Hills. A seventh season started in 2020 with an all-female surgeon cast.

The show is produced by E!, but is broadcast on several other basic cable networks, such as the Style Network. Each episode is approximately one hour long.

== Dr. 90210 (2004–2008) ==
Dr. 90210 features interviews with the patients, semi-graphic footage of the surgeries, and before and after footage of the patients. For American broadcasts, images of genitalia, bare buttocks, or female nipples were blurred out, while European broadcasts were left uncensored. The show also examines the lives of the doctors in its lineup.

Dr. 90210 was inspired by the FX series Nip/Tuck. The show began by focusing on the practice of Robert Rey, a Brazilian-American plastic surgeon in Beverly Hills, and his family life. Dr. Rey has practiced with various surgical groups throughout Southern California, including the Plastic Surgery Institute of California.

The show's lineup has expanded to include practices of other doctors such as that of Gary Alter, Jason Diamond, Linda Li, David Matlock, Dean Manus, Gary Motykie, and Big Brother 2 winner and specialist on laser tattoo removal, Will Kirby.

== Dr. 90210 (2020–) ==
E! revived the series with an all-female surgeon cast that premiered on September 28, 2020. E! says that they are "a new squad of women redefining age-old beauty standards." The show is produced by Entertainment One and is broadcast on basic cable networks E! and streaming platforms Hulu Live, Sling, and E! on Demand.

Each episode is approximately one hour long. Each episode features three of the four surgeons as they tackle challenging plastic surgery problems such as massive breast reduction, facial plastic surgery, breast reconstruction, cyst removals, mommy makeover and vaginal reconstruction.

The show's lineup in the 2020 revival of the series are doctors Kelly Killeen, Michelle Lee, Cat Begovic, and Suzanne Quardt.
