= George A. Freedman =

Canadian dentist

George A. Freedman (born May 5, 1952) is a Canadian dentist, inventor, and dental educator in the field of cosmetic and aesthetic dentistry. He is married to Fay B. Goldstep, DDS, (born 1954), with whom he has shared a private dental practice in Markham, Ontario, Canada, since 1988.

== Biography ==
A graduate of McGill University, Montreal, where he received his BSc in 1974 and DDS in 1978, Freedman has held visiting or adjunct positions at the following universities: Case Western Reserve (Cleveland), Baylor College of Dentistry (Dallas), State University of New York at Buffalo, Eastman Dental Center (Rochester, NY), Minnesota (Minneapolis), Missouri (Kansas City), California (San Francisco), Tufts (Boston), Institute of Aesthetic Dentistry (Barcelona, Spain), and Firenze (Italy.)

He has written or contributed to 12 textbooks, including The Color Atlas of Porcelain Laminate Veneers (1990), and The Color Atlas of Tooth Whitening (1991), as well as the recently published, Contemporary Esthetic Dentistry, published by Elsevier, the Netherlands-based healthcare publishers. He has written and published more than 700 scientific articles in professional journals and is author or co-author of 12 textbooks.

Freedman is director and past president of the American Academy of Cosmetic Dentistry, and a Fellow of the following organizations: European Society of Cosmetic Dentistry, American Society for Dental Aesthetics, Academy of Dentistry International, American College of Dentists, International Academy for Dental Facial Esthetics, and the Canadian Dental Association. He is an honorary member of the academies of aesthetic dentistry of India and Turkey, and a founder of the academies of aesthetic dentistry in Canada and Romania. He serves as educational director of the University Dental Education Conference, based in Toronto, Ontario, Canada.

Freedman developed several widely distributed aesthetic products, including the Shofu Porcelain Veneer Kit (1986), Aesculap Posterior Esthetic Restorative Kit (PERK) (1998), and Brasseler Posterior Composite Finishing Kit (1999.) He serves as products editor of the journal Dentistry Today (USA), and an editorial board member of Oral Health magazine (Canada.)
