= Kenneth Ouriel =

American medical researcher and vascular surgeon

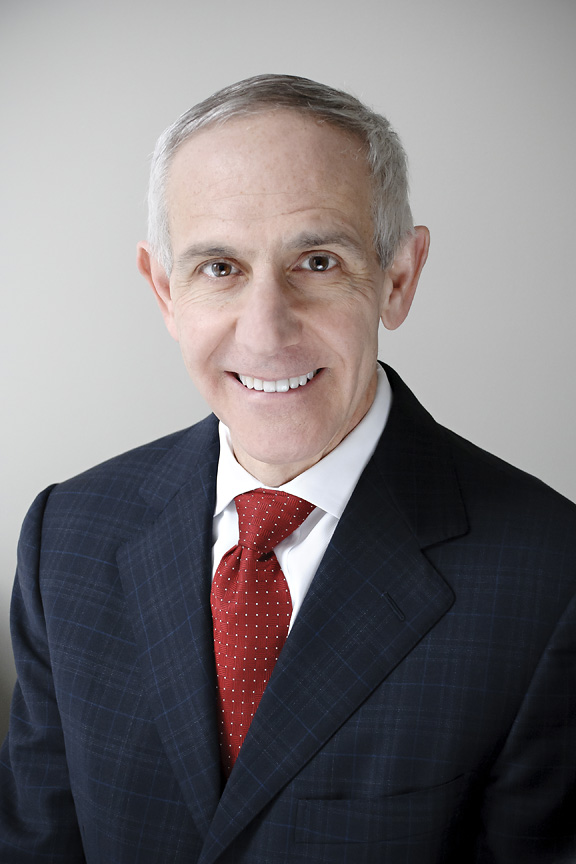
- Ouriel in 2012
- Born: October 21, 1956 (age 69); Rochester, New York, US
- Education: University of Rochester, University of Chicago; Columbia Business School, London Business School
- Years active: 28
- Known for: research; administration; famous patients; textbooks
- Medical career
- Profession: Physician
- Institutions: Cleveland Clinic, Shaikh Khalifa Medical City, New York-Presbyterian Hospital
- Sub-specialties: Vascular surgery
- Research: Vascular surgery research
- Awards: Liebig Foundation Award

Kenneth Ouriel (born October 21, 1956) is a vascular surgeon and medical researcher. In 2007, Ouriel was appointed the chief executive officer of Sheikh Khalifa Medical City in Abu Dhabi. In 2009, he was senior vice president and chief of international operations at NewYork-Presbyterian Hospital. He has been described as one of America's top vascular surgeons.

== Early life and education ==
Ouriel was born in Rochester, New York, entered college at age 16, majored in biology and psychology at the University of Rochester and belonged to the fraternity Alpha Delta Phi. He was elected to Phi Beta Kappa in 1976 and graduated summa cum laude in 1977. He studied medicine at the University of Chicago and graduated in 1981 with Honors. He began a residency in general surgery at the University of Rochester Medical Center and completed a vascular surgical fellowship in 1987. He got a National Institutes of Health grant to study thrombosis and published results from a large, multicenter randomized trial of clot busting therapy in The New England Journal of Medicine in 1998.

== Career ==
In 1998, he was recruited to the Cleveland Clinic as the chief of Vascular Surgery. He was promoted to Chief of Surgery in 2003 where he supervised 340 surgeons in the largest surgical department in the world. He authored three textbooks in vascular surgery and over 250 original scientific articles on a wide variety of vascular surgical topics, focusing on minimally invasive means to treat vascular disease.

In 2001, he treated former presidential candidate Bob Dole who, at age 77, had an abdominal aortic aneurysm; Ouriel led a team of surgeons that inserted a stent graft. "Ouriel said that the team inserted a Y-shaped tube through an incision in Dole's leg and placed it inside the weakened portion of the aorta. The aneurysm will eventually contract around the stent, which will remain in place for the rest of Dole's life," wrote a reporter. Ouriel was the principal investigator on a five-year $5 million National Institutes of Health grant to study intravascular ultrasound regarding atherosclerotic plaque.

In June 2007, Ouriel became chief executive officer of Sheikh Khalifa Medical City in Abu Dhabi, when Cleveland Clinic and the Abu Dhabi health authority formed a partnership in which the Clinic took over management of the health care facilities. In that connection, Ouriel matriculated in an Executive MBA program in global business jointly run by Columbia Business School and the London Business School. Ouriel worked on upgrade systems involving the future hospital's financial, decision-support management, inventory control and medical productivity software. Ouriel was the CEO of the Sheikh Khalifa Medical City. Ouriel, as part of the UAE health authority, met with visiting dignitaries, including First Lady Laura Bush. Ouriel completed his master's degree in business administration from Columbia and London Business Schools. While heading the Sheikh Khalifa Medical City in Abu Dhabi in the United Arab Emirates, Ouriel initiated a controversial move to disclose hospital data online which would allow people to get a "snapshot of the facility's clinical strengths and weaknesses"; he favors transparency.

Ouriel facilitated the development of the first permanent renal transplantation program in the United Arab Emirates, where the Sheikh Khalifa team performed their first kidney transplant in early 2008. In June 2008, Ouriel became senior vice president and chief of international operations at New York-Presbyterian. In 2009, Ouriel made speeches to medical professionals about such topics as retaining patients and public-private partnerships.

In 2010, Ouriel founded Syntactx, a contract medical research company that provides support for diagnostic labs, medical device and pharmaceutical companies in designing and carrying out clinical research trials, and thereafter led the company. It was announced in January 2021 that Syntactx was acquired by North American Science Associates (NAMSA).

== Publications ==
- 1995, textbook, Lower Extremity Vascular Disease
- 1998, textbook, Mastery of Vascular and Endovascular Surgery
- 2005, textbook, Complications In Endovascular Therapy
- 1998, paper, A comparison of recombinant urokinase with vascular surgery as initial treatment for acute arterial occlusion of the legs. Thrombolysis or Peripheral Arterial Surgery (TOPAS)
- 2001, paper, Peripheral arterial disease
- 2013, paper, Reporting standards for adverse events after medical device use in the peripheral vascular system
