= Robert Strawderman =

American biostatistician

Robert L. Strawderman
- Occupations: Academic biostatistician and researcher

Academic background
- Education: Rutgers University (1988); Harvard University (1990; 1992)

Academic work
- Discipline: Statistics
- Sub-discipline: Biostatistics
- Institutions: University of Rochester; Cornell University; University of Michigan
- Website: www.urmc.rochester.edu/biostat/people/faculty/strawderman.aspx

Robert L. Strawderman is an academic biostatistician and researcher who holds the Donald M. Foster, MD Distinguished Professorship in Biostatistics at the University of Rochester. He has served as chair of the Department of Biostatistics and Computational Biology since 2012. Strawderman's principal research interests include semiparametric methods for missing and censored data and statistical learning methods for risk and outcome prediction. Contributions in numerous other areas include inference and variable selection in the areas of dynamic treatment regimes and causal inference in mediation analysis and for recurrent events.

== Education and Career Highlights ==
Strawderman graduated from Rutgers University in New Brunswick, New Jersey with a B.A. in mathematics in 1988, and completed a M.Sc. and Sc.D. in biostatistics at Harvard University in 1990 and 1992, respectively. He completed his dissertation under the direction of Anastasios A. (Butch) Tsiatis. Strawderman then joined the faculty of the Department of Biostatistics at the University of Michigan (Ann Arbor, MI) in 1992 as an assistant professor. Strawderman moved to Cornell University (Ithaca, NY) in 2000 as an associate professor in the Departments of Statistical Science and Biological Statistics and Computational Biology, becoming Professor in 2005. Strawderman later joined the University of Rochester to become chair of the Department of Biostatistics and Computational Biology within the School of Medicine and Dentistry in 2012, where he was initially appointed as a Dean's Professor and later named as the inaugural recipient of the Foster distinguished professorship in 2014.

Strawderman served as an Associate Editor for the Journal of the American Statistical Association (Theory & Methods) from 1997 through 2017, as well as for the Electronic Journal of Statistics from 2007 through 2013. He additionally served as officer for the Caucus of Academic Representatives (chair, 2017–2018), a committee formed by the American Statistical Association to "promote the statistics discipline within the academic community and provide resources for academic statisticians to successfully advocate for the discipline."

In 2006, Strawderman was elected as a Fellow of the American Statistical Association for "outstanding contributions to statistical methodology in the areas of failure time and recurrent event data and small sample inference; for excellence in collaborative research and teaching; and, for editorial service"; in 2012, he was elected as a Fellow of the Institute of Mathematical Statistics for "innovative methodological contributions to survival analysis, recurrent events, and small sample asymptotics and their applications; for excellence in editorial service." Strawderman is also the 2008 recipient of the Distinguished Alumni Award from the Department of Biostatistics at Harvard University.

== Personal ==
Strawderman is the son of William E. Strawderman (1941 - 2024), former Professor of Statistics at Rutgers University (1970 - 2022) and world-renowned for his contributions to decision theory and Bayesian analysis (https://statistics.rutgers.edu/images/Strawderman_Memoriam.pdf).
