= University of Rochester School of Medicine and Dentistry =

Medical school in Rochester, New York, US

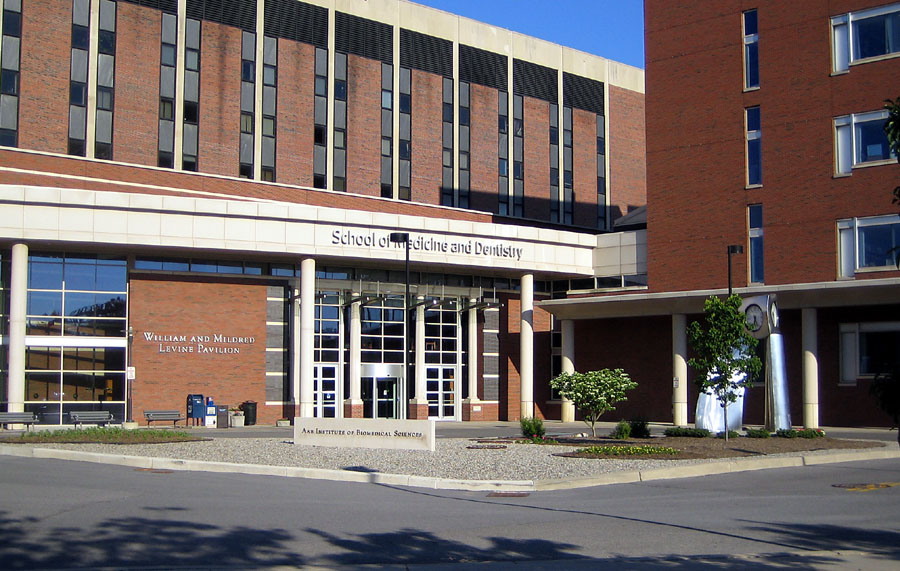
- Motto: Meliora
- Motto in English: "Ever better"
- Type: Private medical school
- Established: 1925
- Parent institution: University of Rochester
- Affiliations: University of Rochester Medical Center, Strong Memorial Hospital, Eastman Institute for Oral Health
- Dean: David C. Linehan
- Students: 1,981 (approx. 400 medical students, 750 graduate/post-doctoral, and 775 residents/fellows)
- Location: Rochester, New York, United States; 43.1232°N 77.6269°W
- Website: www.urmc.rochester.edu/smd/

The School of Medicine and Dentistry (SMD) is an accredited medical school and school for advanced dental education, with graduate education programs in biomedical, biological and health sciences. The facilities of the school are located in the URMC complex and the adjoining Arthur Kornberg Medical Research Building with research facilities. Dental education and patient facilities are located within the URMC complex and the Eastman Institute for Oral Health.

== History ==
Nobel Laureate George Hoyt Whipple, M.D., became the first Dean of the Medical School in 1921, bringing Abraham Flexner’s innovative model to life. Backed by George Eastman's philanthropy, Whipple oversaw the creation of a unified medical school and hospital that combined basic science with clinical practice. The medical school opened in 1925, and its first class graduated in 1929.

In May 2023, the medical school's Orthopedics Department opened the new UR Medicine Orthopaedics and Physical Performance Center Facility. The 330,000-square-foot comprehensive center was constructed as part of a $227 million project.

With a planned 2027 inauguration, a $650 million project on the site of the URMC's Strong Memorial Hospital campus is expected to modernize and triple the capacity of the Emergency Department at the hospital.

== Academics ==
URSMD offers a variety of degree programs including:

- Doctor of Medicine (MD)
- Doctor of Philosophy (PhD) in biomedical sciences
- Master’s degrees in public health, medical statistics, clinical investigation, and more
- MD/PhD and MD/MBA dual degree programs
- Dental education, primarily through research-focused PhD and postdoctoral opportunities in oral biology in addition to specialty training

URSMD is composed of numerous clinical and basic science departments, including:

- Department of Medicine
- Department of Surgery
- Department of Neurology
- Department of Microbiology and Immunology
- Department of Biostatistics and Computational Biology
- Eastman Institute for Oral Health (affiliated with dental residency training and research)

Major research centers include:

- Wilmot Cancer Institute
- Center for RNA Biology
- Del Monte Institute for Neuroscience
- Environmental Health Sciences Center

SMD also received a full six-year accreditation by the Accreditation Council for Graduate Medical Education for its 26 residency programs at Strong Memorial Hospital in 2005.

== Research ==
The University of Rochester School of Medicine and Dentistry (URSMD) is a nationally recognized research institution, consistently ranked among the top U.S. medical schools in terms of federal research funding per faculty member. The school is especially noted for its contributions in neuroscience, immunology, cancer biology, aging, and vaccine development.

The Del Monte Institute for Neuroscience has received significant NIH support and is known for advancing understanding in areas such as traumatic brain injury, Parkinson’s disease, and neurodevelopmental disorders. The school also houses the Environmental Health Sciences Center, which investigates the effects of environmental agents on human health and is one of the longest continuously funded centers of its kind in the United States.

During the COVID-19 pandemic, URSMD was selected as one of the sites for early human trials of the Pfizer-BioNTech and Moderna vaccines, contributing vital data on immunogenicity and efficacy. Additionally, UR researchers played a leading role in monoclonal antibody therapy development in collaboration with Regeneron and other biotech firms.

The Wilmot Cancer Institute, affiliated with the School of Medicine and Dentistry, has been a leader in translational cancer research, especially in lymphoma, leukemia, and solid tumor immunotherapy.

With more than $160 million in annual NIH funding, URSMD supports over 500 active clinical and basic science studies. The institution fosters interdisciplinary collaboration across its many centers and departments, leveraging its integrated academic medical center to translate scientific discoveries into clinical applications.

== Reputation ==
SMD has ranked in the top 35 graduate schools by U.S. News & World Report several times. In 2023, the medical school's class size was 105, the mean GPA was 3.82 and mean MCAT score was 516.

The University of Rochester School of Medicine and Dentistry (URSMD) is nationally recognized for its strengths in research, clinical training, and dental education. In the 2024 U.S. News & World Report rankings, URSMD tied for 32nd in research and 40th in primary care among U.S. medical schools, placing it in Tier 1 for research and Tier 2 for primary care. The school is also classified as an R1 institution for very high research activity. Its dental division, the Eastman Institute for Oral Health, is internationally respected and consistently ranks among the top U.S. dental institutions for NIH funding—7th in 2020.

== Notable faculty and alumni ==
=== Current and past faculty members ===
- George W. Corner, American physician, embryologist and pioneer of the contraceptive pill
- Stafford L. Warren, American physician and radiologist who was a pioneer in the field of nuclear medicine and best known for his invention of the mammogram
- Porter W. Anderson Jr., American microbiologist, best known for developing the vaccine against Haemophilus influenzae type b (Hib)
- George Packer Berry (Prof. 1932–1949), later dean of Harvard Medical School
- Henrik Dam (Prof. 1942–1945), Nobel laureate (1943, physiology or medicine)
- George L. Engel, psychiatrist and creator of biopsychosocial model
- Paul Fiset, microbiologist and developer of the Q fever vaccine
- Lynne E. Maquat, professor of biochemistry and biophysics, pediatrics and oncology at the University of Rochester Medical Center
- Charles E. Phelps, expert on health care economics, former Provost (education) of the University of Rochester
- Frank E. Young, American physician who served as Commissioner of Food and Drugs
- David S. Guzick, American reproductive endocrinologist and economist
- Harold Hodge toxicologist, first president of the Society of Toxicology
- Barbara Iglewski American microbiologist
- Robert Strawderman biostatistician and researcher
- Lainie Friedman Ross, American physician and bioethicist
- Thomas W. Clarkson, American heavy metals toxicologist
- Lisa Kitko, nurse scientist and academic administrator
- Kenneth Ouriel, vascular surgeon and researcher
- George Hoyt Whipple (Prof. 1914–1976), Nobel laureate (1934, physiology or medicine)
- Maiken Nedergaard, Danish neuroscientist, known for discovering the glymphatic system
- Charles David Allis, American molecular biologist, expert in epigenetics
- Wallace O. Fenn, chairman of the department of physiology at the University of Rochester
- Johannes Holtfreter, German-American developmental biologist
- Edward M. Hundert, former Dean of Medical Education at Harvard Medical School
- Loretta Ford, American nurse, co-founder of the first nurse practitioner program, and founding dean of school of nursing

=== Alumni ===
- Harvey J. Alter, medical researcher, virologist, physician, and recipient of the Nobel Prize for Medicine (2020)
- Donald Henderson, physician, educator, and epidemiologist, Dean of the Johns Hopkins School of Public Health
- James V. Neel, geneticist who played a key role in the development of human genetics as a field of research in the United States
- Jason Diamond, plastic surgeon
- Seymour I. Schwartz, prolific surgeon, author of Schwartz's Principles of Surgery
- Julian Earls, NASA physicist, inducted into the Presidential Rank Award of the Senior Executive Service
- Mary Calderone, physician and public health advocate who was an instrumental figure in the advancement of reproductive rights and sex education in the United States.
- Bernadette Drummond, professor of dentistry in New Zealand and the UK
- Arthur Kornberg, molecular biologist who won the Nobel Prize in Physiology or Medicine 1959 for his discovery of "the mechanisms in the biological synthesis of deoxyribonucleic acid (DNA)." Severo Ochoa of New York University was a co-recipient of the award.
- Richard Locksley, medical doctor, professor and researcher of infectious diseases at the University of California, San Francisco
- Kenneth Ouriel, vascular surgeon and researcher
- William Masters, American gynecologist and the senior member of the Masters and Johnson human sexuality research team
- Philip Pizzo, David and Susan Heckerman Professor and Professor of Microbiology and Immunology and former Dean of the Stanford University School of Medicine
- Renée Richards, American ophthalmologist and former professional tennis player
- Bernadette Mazurek Melnyk, nurse, professor of pediatrics and psychiatry at Ohio State University College of Medicine and dean of the College of Nursing
- Henry Metzger, immunologist
- Vincent du Vigneaud, recipient of the 1955 Nobel Prize in Chemistry, known for synthesizing oxytocin and vasopressin
- David Nash, American physician, public health expert, Founding Dean Emeritus, Professor of Health Policy at the Jefferson College of Population Health
- Michelle Albert, cardiologist, Chair in Cardiology and professor of medicine at the University of California, San Francisco
- David Amaral, professor of psychiatry, research director at the M.I.N.D. Institute
- Clement Finch, hematologist and anemia researcher
- Diane Mathis, chair of immunohematology at Harvard Medical School
- Don Catlin, American anti-doping scientist
- Michael S. Gottlieb, American physician and immunologist known for his 1981 identification of acquired immune deficiency syndrome (AIDS)
- Roger Nicoll, American neuroscientist
- David Satcher, four-star admiral in the United States Public Health Service Commissioned Corps and served as the 11th Assistant Secretary for Health, and the 16th Surgeon General of the United States
- Tener Goodwin Veenema, Senior Scientist in the Department of International Health at the Johns Hopkins Bloomberg School of Public Health
- John Romano, founded the Department of Psychiatry at the University of Rochester
- Jonathan D. Quick, family physician and public health management specialist
- Akilah Weber, American politician and physician serving in the California State Assembly
- Phillip Russell (general), American arbovirologist, former commander of United States Army Medical Research and Development Command
- John Rowe (Aetna), American businessman and academic physician, who served as chairman and CEO of Aetna Inc.
- Barbara Ann DeBuono, former New York State Commissioner of Health
- Frederick Bieber, Canadian-American geneticist currently serving as senior medical geneticist at Brigham and Women's Hospital
- Richard Isay, American psychiatrist, psychoanalyst, professor of psychiatry at Weill Cornell Medical College
- Eileen Sullivan-Marx, dean of the New York University Rory Meyers College of Nursing
- Elizabeth R. McAnarney, pediatrician who is recognized for her leadership in the fields of adolescent medicine and pediatrics
- Willard Myron Allen, American gynecologist, discoverer of progesterone
- Jeremy Glick, United Airlines Flight 93 passenger and hero on 9/11
- Harold Paz, former executive vice president and chief medical officer at CVS Health/Aetna
- Jonathan Samet, American pulmonary physician and epidemiologist who serves as dean of the Colorado School of Public Health
- Paul E. Turner, American evolutionary biologist and virologist, Professor of ecology and evolutionary biology at Yale University
- Bernard T. Ferrari, dean of the Carey Business School of the Johns Hopkins University
- Nevin S. Scrimshaw, American food scientist Institute Professor emeritus at the Massachusetts Institute of Technology
- Alan S. Rabson, American pathologist and cancer researcher, and was deputy director of the National Cancer Institute
- Edward D. Miller, anesthesiologist, Dean of the Medical Faculty at Johns Hopkins University and the Chief Executive Officer of Johns Hopkins Medicine
- Carol Nadelson, psychiatrist, first female president of the American Psychiatric Association
- Michael Pichichero, American physician who is the Director of the Rochester General Hospital Research Institute
- Eric Topol, Scripps Health Chief Academic Officer, cardiologist
- Warren Zapol, director of the Massachusetts General Hospital Anesthesia Center for Critical Care Research
- Donald Henderson, physician and epidemiologist who headed the smallpox eradication campaign
