= Barbara Ann DeBuono =

Health executive (b. 1955)

Commissioner of Health of the State of New York
- In office February 1995 – November 1, 1998
- Governor: George Pataki
- Preceded by: Mark R. Chassin
- Succeeded by: Antonia Novello

Personal details
- Born: 1955 (age 70–71) The Bronx
- Education: University of Rochester School of Medicine
- Occupation: Medical administrator
- Profession: physician

Barbara Ann DeBuono (born 1955, The Bronx) is the vice president, market development for Populations and Payment Solutions at 3M Health Information Systems and a Professional Lecturer at the George Washington University Milken Institute School of Public Health. She was the New York State Commissioner of Health under Governor George Pataki from February 1995 until November 1, 1998, when she resigned to become chief executive of the NewYork-Presbyterian Healthcare System. Before that, she was Director of Health in Rhode Island under Gov. Bruce Sundlun. She was also president and CEO of the non-profit ORBIS International.

DeBuono was the first female Commissioner of Health of the State of New York. Pataki recruited her from Rhode Island “to oversee what he described as one of his major goals: to enroll millions of the people on Medicaid into managed care plans. She also was charged with negotiating the Governor's positions with the Democrats in the Legislature earlier this year in a major expansion of a program to provide health insurance to children.” Two years before she left the position, she oversaw the “deregulation of the state's hospitals and the rates they were paid.”. In Rhode Island, she championed programs for breast cancer screenings as well as AIDS.

DeBuono earned a B.A. from the University of Rochester (biology, 1976), a medical degree from the University of Rochester School of Medicine (1980) and a Masters in Public Health from the Harvard University School of Public Health.
