= Lisa Kitko =

American nurse scientist and academic administrator

- Education: University of Pittsburgh School of Nursing; Pennsylvania State University
- Scientific career
- Fields: Nursing research
- Workplaces: Pennsylvania State University; University of Rochester

Lisa A. Kitko is an American nurse scientist and academic administrator serving as dean of the University of Rochester School of Nursing and vice president of the University of Rochester Medical Center.

== Life ==
Kitko earned a B.S.N. in 1990 from the University of Pittsburgh School of Nursing. She earned a M.S.N. in clinical nurse specialist and adult health (2001) and a Ph.D. in nursing with a minor in gerontology (2010) from the Pennsylvania State University (PSU) College of Nursing.

From 1990 to 2002, Kitko worked as a nurse and later nurse administrator in Pennsylvania. She joined faculty at the PSU College of Nursing as an instructor in May 2002. She was promoted to assistant professor in July 2011 and associate professor with tenure in July 2017. Kitko was inducted as a fellow of the American Heart Association in 2015 and the American Academy of Nursing in 2017. She served as the associate dean of graduate education and director of the Ph.D. program from 2020 to 2022.

Kitko joined the University of Rochester September 2022 as a professor of nursing and dean of the school of nursing. She also became vice president of the University of Rochester Medical Center. In 2023, she was jointly appointed as the Independence Foundation Chair in Nursing Education.

== Research ==
Kitko's research experience centers on palliative care of chronic illnesses, with a focus on advanced cardiac failure. In 2015 Kitko was awarded the Josiah S. Macy Jr. Faculty Scholarship, which she used to develop a postgraduate certificate on palliative care.
