= Jason Diamond =

American plastic surgeon and media personality

- Born: December 21, 1970 (age 55); Glen Ridge, New Jersey, U.S.
- Education: University of Rochester (BS; MD)
- Occupation: Facial Plastic Surgeon (ENT)
- Spouse: Jessica Diamond (m. 2004)
- Children: 2
- Website: www.jasonbdiamond.com

Jason B. Diamond, M.D., F.A.C.S. (born December 21, 1970, in Glen Ridge, New Jersey) is an American facial plastic surgeon(ENT) and television personality.

== Early life ==
Diamond attended the University of Rochester School of Medicine.

== Career ==
Diamond has appeared on the E! Network show, Dr. 90210. Diamond has been featured in various print media, such as People Magazine, Vogue, Elle, and Marie Claire.

In 2010, Diamond got his license to perform surgery in Dubai.

He is in private practice specializing in facial plastic and reconstructive surgery and has offices in Beverly Hills, New York City, Dubai, and Moscow.

== Published works ==
- Diamond, Jason; Gerut, Zachary E; Shire, James R.; Nguyen, Davis B.; Chen, Achih H.; Desmond, Julian C.; Silvati-Fidell, Laura; Abrams, Steve Zvi. "Exploratory, Randomized, Controlled, Phase 2 Study to Evaluate the Safety and Efficacy of Adjuvant Fibrin Sealant VH S/D 4 S-Apr (ARTISS) in Patients Undergoing Rhytidectomy." Aesthetic Surgery Journal. 33.3 (2013): 323-333. Print.
- Diamond, J; Skaggs, J; Manaligod, JM (2002). "Free-radical damage: a possible mechanism of laryngeal aging". Ear Nose Throat J. 81: 531–3. PMID 12199170.
- "A Single Dose, Open Label Three Way Crossover, Randomized Pilot Bioavailability Study of Midozolam. Comparing Intranasal Administration to Intramuscular Administration in Healthy Human Volunteers." University of Kentucky Medical Center Protocol Mz0001.
- "A single dose, Open Label, Randomized Three Way Crossover, Bioavailability Study of 1.0 mg and 2.0 Intranasal Butorphanol Tartrate Compared to 2.0 mg. Intravenous Botorphanol Tartrate In Healthy Human Volunteers." University of Kentucky Chandler Medical Center Protocol BT002.
- "A single Dose, Randomized Two Period Crossover Pharmacokinetic Study of 2.0 mg Intranasal Hydromorphone Hydrochloride In Healthy Human Volunteers Using 10 mg/ml and 20 mg/ml Formulations. University of Kentucky Medical Center Protocol HM-114.
