= University of Rochester Medical Center =

Geography
- Location: 601 Elmwood Avenue; Rochester, NY, New York, United States
- Coordinates: 43°07′22″N 77°37′32″W

Organization
- Care system: Private
- Type: Academic
- Affiliated university: University of Rochester

Services
- Standards: Tertiary Care
- Emergency department: Level I trauma center
- Beds: 897

History
- Opened: 1925

Links
- Website: www.urmc.rochester.edu
- Lists: Hospitals in New York State

The University of Rochester Health Sciences Campus, formerly University of Rochester Medical Center (URMC), now known as URochester Medicine, located in Rochester, New York, is a medical complex on the main campus of the University of Rochester and comprises the university's primary medical education, research and patient care facilities.

== Schools and facilities ==
University of Rochester Medicine is upstate New York's largest academic health system, and the centerpiece of the University's patient care and health sciences education missions. The University’s Health Sciences Campus, known previously as University of Rochester Medical Center (URMC), is one of the largest facilities for medical treatment and research in Upstate New York and includes a regional Perinatal Center, Trauma Center, Burn Center, Cancer Center, an Epilepsy Center, Psychiatric/Behavioral Health Emergency and treatment departments, Liver Transplant Center and Cardiac Transplant Center and also includes a major AIDS Treatment Center and an NIH-designated AIDS Vaccine Evaluation Unit. A large portion of the university's biomedical research is conducted in the Arthur Kornberg Medical Research Building and the Aab Institute of Biomedical Sciences.

In January 2008, the University of Rochester announced a $500 million strategic plan geared toward expansion in research and patient services. The plan anticipated adding 1,800 new jobs to the university, building a 123-bed addition to the hospital, a building for clinical and translational sciences, and a new ambulatory surgery center.

=== Strong Memorial Hospital ===
Strong Memorial Hospital is the main teaching hospital and patient care facility at the University of Rochester and is housed within the main complex of the University's Health Sciences Campus. It is a Level I trauma center serving the Rochester area. SMH offers care in 40 different specialties and is ranked as one of "America's Best Hospitals" by U.S. News & World Report, and has won the Consumer Choice Award for the best hospital in the area for 12 consecutive years. Strong has signature programs in cardiac care, cancer care, neurology, orthopedics and pediatrics.

=== Golisano Children's Hospital ===
Golisano Children's Hospital (GCH) formerly Children's Hospital at Strong, is a nationally ranked, freestanding acute care children's hospital in Rochester, New York. It is affiliated with the University of Rochester School of Medicine and Dentistry. The hospital has 190 pediatric beds. The hospital provides comprehensive pediatric specialties and subspecialties to infants, children, teens, and young adults aged 0–21. The hospital also treats adults that require pediatric care. The hospital shares the rooftop helipad for the attached Strong Memorial Hospital and is an ACS verified level I pediatric trauma center, one of the only ones in the region. The hospital features a regional pediatric intensive-care unit and an American Academy of Pediatrics verified level IV neonatal intensive care unit.

=== School of Nursing ===
The School of Nursing & Health Sciences is an accredited nursing education program located in the Helen Wood Hall building of the University's Health Sciences Campus. In 2018, the school's Pediatric Nurse Practitioner program was ranked the 12th best in the U.S., with the School of Nursing landing 37th for the nursing master's program and the Family Nurse Practitioner program ranked 17th by U.S. News.

== Recent developments ==
Several programs and centers have been founded at University of Rochester Medicine. In 2006, a cancer stem cell research program was established at the Wilmot Cancer Center, one of only three such programs in the United States, the others being at Harvard University and Stanford University. In 2006, a new Clinical and Translational Sciences Institute was announced. The program was awarded a $40 million NIH grant.

In 2013, University of Rochester Medicine acquired Lakeside Hospital in Brockport and renamed it URMC Strong West. When it reopened, it had an urgent care center and planned to add an emergency department. Since 2016, University of Rochester Medicine has created a network of Urgent Care centers branded as UR Medicine Urgent Care in the Rochester, NY area.

In 2024, Tom Golisano announced that he had made a $50 million donation, the largest single gift in University history, to build the Golisano Intellectual and Developmental Disabilities Institute, and expand care for people with intellectual and developmental disabilities in the Rochester region.

== Faculty ==
- George Packer Berry (Prof. 1932–1949), later dean of Harvard Medical School
- Henrik Dam (Prof. 1942–1945), Nobel laureate (1943, physiology or medicine)
- George L. Engel, psychiatrist and creator of biopsychosocial model
- Paul Fiset, microbiologist and developer of the Q fever vaccine
- Lisa Kitko, nurse scientist and academic administrator
- Kenneth Ouriel, vascular surgeon and researcher
- George Hoyt Whipple (Prof. 1914–1976), Nobel laureate (1934, physiology or medicine)

== See also ==
- Eastman Institute for Oral Health
