= CAMBRA =

Preventative form of dentistry

- Developed by: University of California, San Francisco
- Introduced: 2007
- Industry: Dentistry
- Website: https://dentistry.ucsf.edu/research/cambra

CAMBRA is an acronym for Caries Management by Risk Assessment. It describes a preventative form of dentistry in which patients are categorized by their relative risk for developing dental caries, based on risk factors including diet, oral hygiene, fluoride regiment, and past oral health history. It also attempts to avoid expenses associated with restorative processes.

It is meant to be used as a guide rather than an identification system, meaning the health care provider makes the judgement. However, a few medical experts have created an article on PubMed Central arguing that there is little evidence supporting CAMBRA and its integration into dentistry as it currently stands.

== Origin ==
The CAMBRA system was developed at University of California, San Francisco (UCSF) in the early 2000's. The name was coined in 2002, and the protocol was introduced in 2007. The CAMBRA system would periodically receive updates until 2021. CAMBRA was created to be an evidence-based approach to the prevention, reversal, and treatment of dental caries in patients, with risk factor as a main focus. The CAMBRA system aims to provide an in-depth assessment tool as a key element of the overall approach and take account of caries disease indicators, examples being socio-economic status, developmental problems, or the presence of lesions or dental restorations placed within the previous 3 years. However, the health care provider makes the judgement about the patient's risk and preventative measures based on the CAMBRA system.

== Risk factors ==
CAMBRA focuses on the disease process and taking into account all factors that contribute to the development of dental caries (attacking factors) and all factors that research has shown to be protective from dental caries (defense factors).

CAMBRA claims to recognize the following as attacking factors for caries:

1. Visible accumulations of dental plaque and quantitative assessment of Streptococcus mutans and Lactobacillus spp.
2. Frequent snacking
3. Irregular saliva flow and salivary modifying factors
4. Fissures
5. Root surface exposure
6. The presence of dental braces

CAMBRA claims to recognize the following as defense factors against caries:

1. Systemic and topical fluoride sources
2. Adequate saliva flow
3. Use of calcium and phosphate paste or chlorhexidine

Caries can be identified by the presence of white spots, decalcifications of the teeth, restorations, or plaque deposits. CAMBRA assigns patients to low, moderate, high, or extreme risk and offers two formats; one for patients aged 0-5 years, and one for 6 years onward.

== Benefits ==
An intended benefit of CAMBRA is that it is meant to force both the dental professional and the patient (or their caregiver) to consider all the factors relevant to the patient’s risk and disease state, shifting the focus away from the traditional restorative approach of cavitation and restoration toward the cause of the disease and the need to modify the causes. It also attempts to improve communication and understanding between everyone involved, such as the patient and the members of the dental team. CAMBRA also attempts to "save patients thousands of dollars in dental bills over their lifetimes" by offering these preventative measures so that expensive actions can be avoided.

== Criticism ==
=== Opposing Article ===
A PubMed Central article published to the United States National Library of Medicine (NLM)'s website by several medical experts in Portugal examines the results of 3 studies uploaded to PubMed Central in 2015, 2018, and 2021. The studies were obtained through an electronic search of PubMed, Cochrane, Web of Science, Scopus, and Embase, and were the only ones included as they were the only clinical studies to use the CAMBRA method with a control group. None of the articles used the 2019 or 2021 versions of CAMBRA, but all articles are in favor of implementing CAMBRA.

==== Reasoning ====
The opposing article uses the Revised Cochrane Risk-Of-Bias Tool For Randomized Trials (RoB 2) for the 2015 and 2018 articles. A few concerns were raised on the 2015 article about possible selection bias and the final judgement, believed to have deviated from what CAMBRA had intended. The 2015 study had the most significant statistical differences from non-CAMBRA tests of the three studies, but the results were compared to control/intervention instead of the baseline/follow-up actions. Using the Risk Of Bias In Non-Randomized Studies - of Interventions (ROBINS-I) for the 2021 article, they raised extreme concerns about confounding and selection bias in the study.

The opposing article uses these possible biases and inconsistencies as evidence that CAMBRA is not effective, and would not be worth implementing into dentistry in its current state.
