= Carol Nadelson =

American psychiatrist

- Born: October 13, 1936 (age 89); Brooklyn, New York, US
- Spouses: Ted Nadelson (m. 1965; died 2003) David Shander (m. 1958, divorced)

Academic background
- Education: BA, 1957, Brooklyn College; MD, 1961, University of Rochester Medical Center

Carol Cooperman Nadelson (born October 13, 1936) is an American psychiatrist. In 1984, she was elected the first female president of the American Psychiatric Association (APA).

== Early life and education ==
Cooperman Nadelson was born on October 13, 1936, in Brooklyn, New York to Jewish parents Herman and Diana Cooperman. Her father worked for the United States Post Office while her mother was a secretary before child-rearing. Growing up, Cooperman Nadelson said her mother's clear resentment of being a housewife inspired her to pursue a career outside of the home. Upon graduating from high school, she enrolled as a pre-med student at Brooklyn College where she was usually the only female student in her advanced level courses. In spite of this, she became the first woman president of the college's Bio-Med Society, was inducted into Phi Beta Kappa, and graduated magna cum laude.

After graduating near the top of her class, Cooperman Nadelson enrolled at the only medical school to accept her, Albert Einstein Medical School. However, after marrying her boyfriend David Shander in 1958, who attended University of Rochester Medical Center, she persuaded the faculty to accept her there the following term. During her time at the University of Rochester, Cooperman Nadelson experienced sexual harassment by faculty and students and what she felt was a sexist dress code of skirts for women. She later said that the university spent years apologizing to her for having rejected her initial application. Cooperman Nadelson eventually chose to specialize in psychiatry after receiving the Benjamin Rush Prize in Psychiatry during her psychiatry rotation in medical school.

She originally remained at Rochester for her first year of residency before moving on to Massachusetts Mental Health Center. Upon entering her fourth year of residency, the head of the institute wanted her to stay and be the chief resident but she chose to transfer to Beth Israel Deaconess Medical Center, where the chair of psychiatry was a woman. Once she started her residency, however, she and her husband divorced.

== Career ==
In the final year of her residency at Beth Israel, Cooperman Nadelson married a fellow psychiatry student named Theodore Nadelson. Following her residency, she completed a National Institute of Mental Health (NIMH) sponsored Career Teacher Fellowship in medical education and worked as an instructor in psychiatry at Harvard Medical School (HMS) and Beth Israel before being promoted to the rank of assistant professor. During this time, her husband took care of most of the childcare and home-making tasks, even after he became the Chief of Psychiatry. In 1979, Cooperman Nadelson became a professor of psychiatry at Tufts University School of Medicine and vice chair of psychiatry at New England Medical Center. While in this role, she became a founding member of the Association for Academic Psychiatry and was appointed as a consultant to the Psychiatric Education Branch of the NIMH. She was elected the first female president of the American Psychiatric Association (APA) in 1984 and was chief executive officer and editor in chief of American Psychiatric Press Inc. In 1985, the American Medical Women's Association awarded her the Elizabeth Blackwell Medal for her outstanding contributions to women in medicine.

During the early 1990s, Cooperman Nadelson returned to HMS as a Senior Psychiatrist at Cambridge Hospital and was promoted to Clinical Professor at HMS. In 1998, she was appointed founding director of the Office for Women's Careers at Brigham and Women's Hospital which had direct influence at Harvard University on the advancement and success of women physicians, especially of women psychiatrists. At Brigham and Women's Hospital, she formed the OWC Advisory Committee that works with her to identify projects and advocate for women's careers.

=== Awards and honors ===
In 2009, Cooperman Nadelson received the Alma Dea Morani Award for her "major impact on the career development and advancement of women physicians and scientists throughout the world" and "pioneered work in women’s s health and mental health." The following year, in 2010, she was elected a Fellow of the American Academy of Arts and Sciences. A few years later, she was also awarded the Charles Force Hutchinson and Marjorie Smith Hutchinson Medal from the University of Rochester.

== Personal life ==
Cooperman Nadelson and her husband Ted had two children together before his death in 2003.
