= Thomas Diekwisch =

Thomas G. H. Diekwisch
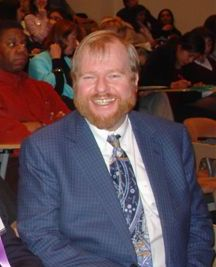
- Thomas G. H. Diekwisch (photo dated 25 May 2010)
- Born: February 27, 1961; Bielefeld, West Germany
- Education: Philipps-University of Marburg
- Known for: Discovery of the CP27 gene, research on tooth enamel and periodontal tissue development, and craniofacial tissue engineering
- Awards: Texas Alliance Legislative Conference on Science, Technology & Mathematics Education Award, Sid W. Richardson Fellowship
- Scientific career
- Fields: Dentistry, Craniofacial biology, Tissue engineering
- Workplaces: University of Rochester, University of Illinois Chicago College of Dentistry, Baylor College of Dentistry
- Website: University of Illinois at Chicago College of Dentistry

Thomas G. H. Diekwisch is an American oral biologist who is founding chair of the Department of Oral and Craniofacial Sciences and Margaret and Cy Welcher Professor/Chair in Dental Research at the Eastman Institute for Oral Health at the University of Rochester.

== Birth and genealogy ==
Thomas Gustav Heinrich Diekwisch was born on February 27, 1961, in Bielefeld, West Germany. The two middle names correspond to his two grandfathers’ first names. Diekwisch is a common name in Northern Germany and translates into “meadow by the lake”. In the 1840s and again in the 1920s, members of the Diekwisch family moved from Germany to the United States, mostly to Illinois. Thomas Diekwisch’s parents are Annelore Spruch and Gerd Diekwisch, also from Bielefeld. They were born in 1930 (father) and 1933 (mother). His mother’s parents were Heinrich and Else Spruch from Bielefeld-Quelle, and his father’s parents were Gustav and Frieda Diekwisch from Bielefeld-Kammeratsheide/Heepen.

== Family background ==
The Spruch and Diekwisch families in Bielefeld belonged to a staunchly social democratic community in Westphalia. They risked their lives by retaining SPD party membership, opposing the Nazis, and supporting the Allies during World War II. Other members of the Spruch family immigrated to Israel after 1933. Thomas Diekwisch grew up in Quelle, a suburb of Bielefeld, with his parents and the Spruch family. Grandfather Heinrich Spruch owned a small factory and instilled in Thomas a love for biology and science in general. All three generations did not serve in the military: Heinrich Spruch was exempted from military service during the war, Gerd Diekwisch belonged to the white generation being 15 years old when the war ended, and Thomas Diekwisch was exempted from military service in the Federal Republic of West Germany (BRD). Only grandfather Gustav was drafted, immediately transported to the Russian front, captured upon arrival, and detained in Siberia for the remainder of the war.

== Academic credentials and career ==
After attending the Gymnasium in Brackwede-Bielefeld, Diekwisch immatriculated at the Philipps-University of Marburg in Hesse, where he graduated in dentistry. In 1988, he got a Dr. med. dent. Degree (in Anatomy, "summa cum laude"), and a Ph.D. in philosophy (2005, “magna cum laude”). From 1986 to 1990, Diekwisch worked as a lecturer, clinical instructor, and research associate in the Departments of Anatomy and Periodontics at the Philipps University. In 1990, he became a postdoctoral fellow in craniofacial biology at the University of Southern California. In 1994, he joined the faculty of Baylor College of Dentistry in Dallas, TX, where he created a community science education outreach program entitled “Habitat for Science” that won awards from the Texas Alliance Legislative Conference on Science, Technology & Mathematics Education, and from the Sid W. Richardson Fellowship.

== Current position and interests ==
In 2001, Diekwisch was recruited to the University of Illinois at Chicago College of Dentistry to become the first Director of the Brodie Laboratory for Craniofacial Genetics and the Allan G. Brodie Endowed Chair. Two years later, he was appointed professor and head of the Department of Oral Biology at the UIC College of Dentistry. Besides Oral Biology, Diekwisch holds appointments in anatomy and cell biology, bioengineering, orthodontics, and periodontics. Diekwisch discovered and characterized a gene, CP27 that plays an important role in craniofacial development. Other research areas include the development and evolution of tooth enamel and periodontal tissues as well as craniofacial tissue engineering.
