= Walter Nance =

American academic (1933–2021)

- Born: Walter Elmore Nance; 1933; Manila, Philippines
- Died: October 17, 2021 (aged 88)
- Education: Phillips Exeter Academy, Harvard Medical School (M.D. 1958), University of Wisconsin (Ph.D. 1968)
- Known for: Hereditary deafness, twin studies
- Spouse: Mayna Avent
- Scientific career
- Fields: Human genetics
- Institutions: Vanderbilt University School of Medicine, Indiana University School of Medicine, Virginia Commonwealth University

Walter Elmore Nance (1933 – October 17, 2021) was an American academic who was Professor and Chair (emeritus) of the Department of Human Genetics of the Virginia Commonwealth University. He was an internationally known expert in hereditary deafness, twin studies and genetic linkage analysis of both continuous and qualitative traits.

== Life and career ==
Nance was born in Manila in 1933. He spent his childhood in Shanghai, New Orleans, and Oak Ridge, Tennessee. Nance graduated from the Phillips Exeter Academy in 1950. He received an S.B. in Mathematics in 1954 from the University of the South, an M.D. in 1958 from Harvard Medical School, and a Ph.D. in Genetics in 1968 from the University of Wisconsin.

Nance was assistant professor of medicine at the Vanderbilt University School of Medicine from 1963 to 1969 and professor of medical genetics and medicine at the Indiana University School of Medicine from 1969 to 1975. In 1975, Nance accepted a position at the Virginia Commonwealth University.

Nance and his wife Mayna Avent retired to Sewanee, Tennessee. He died on October 17, 2021, at the age of 88.
