= Sheikh Khalifa Medical City =

Geography
- Location: Karama Street, Abu Dhabi, United Arab Emirates
- Coordinates: 24°28′13″N 54°21′55″E

Organisation
- Type: District General

Services
- Emergency department: Yes
- Beds: 838

History
- Opened: 2000

Links
- Website: www.skmc.ae
- Lists: Hospitals in United Arab Emirates

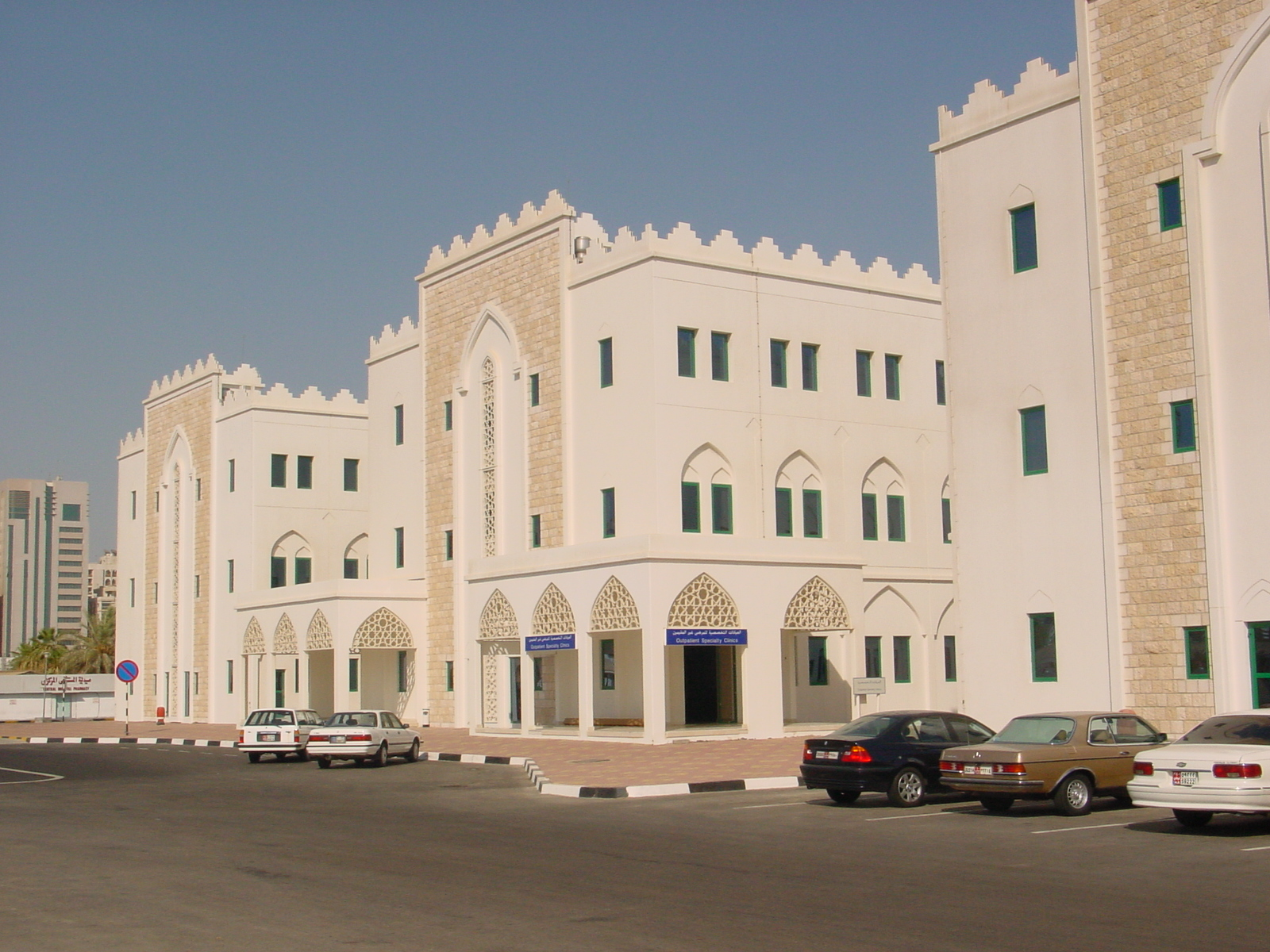
Outpatient Department at SKMC – July, 2000

Sheikh Khalifa Medical City (SKMC) is a medical complex in Abu Dhabi. It serves as the flagship institution of Abu Dhabi Health Services Company (SEHA).

SKMC consists of a 441-bed acute care hospital, 17 outpatient specialty clinics and a blood bank, with accreditation from Joint Commission International (JCI). SKMC also manages a 125-bed psychiatric hospital (BSP) and an urgent care center in Abu Dhabi.

== History ==
Sheikh Khalifa Medical City was created in 2005 as a result of the merger of all publicly-held healthcare organizations on Abu Dhabi island. The merged entities were:

- Abu Dhabi Central Hospital – built in the late 1960s; it was the oldest hospital in Abu Dhabi and served as a 200-bed hospital until it was scaled down in 2003 to an emergency centre and an outpatient dialysis unit. The hospital's remaining urgent care and dialysis services closed on 7 February 2008, and the renal unit was relocated to SKMC's Medical Pavilion.
- Abu Dhabi Psychiatric Hospital – a 163-bed facility
- Abu Dhabi Rehabilitation Center – an 88-bed facility that served mainly as a nursing home for the elderly and people with special needs
- Al Jazeera Hospital – built in the 1970s; it was a 300-bed acute care medical facility for expatriates who lived on Abu Dhabi Island only
- Preventive Medicine Clinic
- Primary Healthcare Clinics – nine clinics dispersed across the island
- Sheikh Khalifa Medical Center – commissioned in 2000 to serve UAE nationals. Although commissioned as a 250-bed acute care medical facility, it initially operated with fewer than 100 acute-care beds and a two-bed intensive care unit.

The merged organisation adopted the name of its newest constituent institution and became known as “Sheikh Khalifa Medical Center”.

SKMC was designed by Skidmore, Owings & Merrill LLP (SOM) in a joint venture with ICME and Tilke.

In 2007, SKMC came under the management of Cleveland Clinic.

In 2008, SKMC's Surgical Pavilion, Medical Pavilion, and outpatient specialty clinics received accreditation from Joint Commission International.

In 2009, it became the first hospital outside the United States, and the twelfth worldwide, to receive Cycle III Chest Pain Centre accreditation from the Society of Chest Pain Centres. Following this, the department of Cardiology received further accreditation in 2012 from the European Association of Echocardiography, and in 2015 from the American College of Cardiology as an International Centre of Excellence.

In 2013, SKMC performed the UAE's first successful kidney transplant using an organ from a deceased donor.

== Clinical services ==
Sheikh Khalifa Medical City consists of a 441-bed Acute Care Hospital, 17 specialized outpatient clinics and the Blood Bank, and is accredited by Joint Commission International (JCI). Additionally, SKMC manages a 125-bed Behavioral Sciences Pavilion and an urgent care center located within the city of Abu Dhabi.

In 2025, SKMC renewed its Joint Commission International hospital accreditation and its paediatric cardiology and cardiac surgery programme received JCI Clinical Care certification.

Departments of related medical specialties collaborate to offer patient-centered care.

Specialist care:

- Cardiac sciences institute
- Critical care
- Emergency medicine
- Medicine institute
- Pathology and laboratory medicine
- Pediatric institute
- Physical medicine and rehabilitation
- Radiology
- Surgery institute

SKMC provides adult and paediatric kidney transplantation services and is developing adult and paediatric liver transplantation programmes.

The hospital has also expanded its paediatric services through a collaboration with Cincinnati Children's, supporting specialist clinical care, research, and medical training. It also operates a dedicated 24-hour paediatric emergency department.
