= Golisano Children's Hospital (Rochester) =

- University of Rochester Medicine

Geography
- Location: 601 Elmwood Ave, Rochester, New York, United States
- Coordinates: 43.122060°N 77.623354°W

Organization
- Type: Teaching
- Affiliated university: University of Rochester School of Medicine and Dentistry

Services
- Emergency department: Level 1 Pediatric Trauma Center
- Beds: 190
- Speciality: Pediatrics

Helipads
- Helipad: FAA LID: 2NY5, Shared with Strong Memorial Hospital

History
- Opened: 2002

Links
- Website: www.urmc.rochester.edu/childrens-hospital.aspx
- Lists: Hospitals in New York State

University of Rochester-Golisano Children's Hospital (GCH) formerly Children's Hospital at Strong, is a nationally ranked, freestanding acute care children's hospital in Rochester, New York. It is affiliated with the University of Rochester School of Medicine and Dentistry. The hospital features all private rooms that consist of 168 pediatric beds. The hospital provides comprehensive pediatric specialties and subspecialties to infants, children, teens, and young adults aged 0–21 throughout the region. The hospital also sometimes treats adults that require pediatric care. The hospital shares the rooftop helipad for the attached Strong Memorial Hospital and is an ACS verified level I pediatric trauma center, one of the only ones in the region. The hospital features a regional pediatric intensive-care unit and an American Academy of Pediatrics verified level IV neonatal intensive care unit. GCH also offers one of the country's few Ronald McDonald Houses that is located within a hospital.

== History ==
Pediatrics at University of Rochester Medicine has historically taken place inside of pediatric units within Strong Memorial Hospital, which combined added up to a 124-bed capacity. These units were known as Children's Hospital at Strong before being renamed to "Golisano Children's Hospital" in 2002 after a $14 million donation from Paychex founder, Tom Golisano.

In 2011 plans were made to build a new freestanding children's hospital and Tom Golisano once again donated $20 million to help with the construction of the new project, with his donations totaling $34 million to the hospital. Plans called for new 245,000 SqF, nine-story building with 2 floors empty to use as shell space for future expansion. Construction was set in two parts, with part one opening in 2015.

The project was set at a price of $134 million, the largest project ever for the University of Rochester. Large donations were made to the hospital from large charities including $7 million from the Wegman Family Foundation, $5 million from Georgia Gosnell, and $3 million from Rick Aab in honor of the Ganatra family.

Phase two of construction began in fall 2016 and included pediatric specific operating rooms and a new pediatric intensive care unit. Construction for phase two took place in the 2 floors that were left for later expansion. Phase two was completed by the summer of 2017.

In early 2020 the hospital rolled out a new service for parents of babies that were in the neonatal intensive care unit. The service run by company, AngelEye is able to provide video 24/7 to parents when they can't be in the nicu with their child. Currently there are 20 cameras installed entirely funded by local donations. These cameras are free for parent use.

== About ==
The new hospital offers many amenities to children previously unseen at Children's Hospital at Strong including a teen lounge, multiple playrooms, and child friendly theming and design.

=== Patient Care Units ===
- 12 bed pediatric intensive care unit
- 16 bed pediatric cardiac intensive care unit
- 68 bed level IV neonatal intensive care unit
- 10 bed pediatric emergency department
- 56 beds general pediatrics

=== Awards ===
Parents Magazine has ranked the hospital as one of the 20 best children's hospitals in the country in their top 20 pediatric technology and innovations rankings.

The 2013-14 U.S. News & World Report ranked Golisano Children's Hospital nationally in pediatric orthopedics.

The 2019-20 U.S. News & World Report ranked Golisano Children's Hospital nationally in pediatric nephrology and neonatology.

The 2020-21 U.S. News & World Report ranked the hospital nationally in neonatology, taking up the #23 place nationally.

U.S. News & World Report ranked the hospital nationally in three children's specialties in 2025. The hospital was ranked No. 4 in New York in 2025.

== See also ==
- List of children's hospitals in the United States
- University of Rochester
- Tom Golisano
- Strong Memorial Hospital
