= Hector L. Sarmiento =

American periodontist

- Born: October 19; Los Angeles
- Education: Universidad Cuauhtemoc (DMD 2006, OMFS), University of Rochester (AEGD 2011), University of Pennsylvania (Periodontics Specialty 2014), University of Pennsylvania ( MSc 2014)
- Occupations: Periodontist, Maxillofacial Surgery, Professor, Researcher
- Known for: Dental implant complications research
- Awards: Americas top dentist for 2014, 2017, 2018.

Hector L. Sarmiento (born October 19) is an American periodontist involved in dental implant complications research.

== Career ==
Sarmiento received his training in Maxillofacial Surgery in Guadalajara, Mexico and completed his certificate in Advanced Education in General Dentistry (US licensure) in 2011 from the University of Rochester. He then pursued his specialization in Periodontics from the University of Pennsylvania in 2014. The same year, he earned his master's degree in Oral Biology from the University of Pennsylvania.

He currently serves as an assistant clinical professor at the University of Pennsylvania and is also a professor in the department of Oral and Maxillofacial Surgery at the regional hospital in Guadalajara, Mexico. He is on the board as the chairman and President of the Advanced Institute for Dental Studies formally known as the Dr. Myron Nevins Institute.

Sarmiento is an American board certified periodontist recognized internationally for his clinical and academic contributions to the field of implant dentistry and is an international and national lecturer. His private practice, however, is limited to Periodontal & Implant Surgery in Manhattan, New York.

Hector L. Sarmiento is notable for his publications in sinus augmentation's via a palatal approach & classifying peri-implantitis.

== Publications ==
=== Scientific research publications ===
- Romanos GE, Sarmiento HL, Yunker M, Malmstrom H. Prevalence of torus mandibularis in Rochester, New York, region. N Y State Dent J. 2013 Jan;79(1): 25–7.
- Sarmiento HL, Othman B, Norton M, Fiorellini JP. Management of A Sinus Augmentation Complication. A Palatal Approach. Case Report. Int J Periodontics Restorative Dent. 2016 Jan-Feb;36(1):111-5.
- Abundo R, Corrente G, Pirelli M, Saccone C, Zambelli M, Sarmiento HL. The coronally advanced flap in the treatment of bilateral multiple gingival recessions with or without tunneling the maxillary midline papilla: a randomized clinical trial. J Oral Science Rehabilitation. 2016 Mar;2(1):56–61.
- Ammannato R., Pirelli M., Lombardo S., Sarmiento HL., Fiorellini JP. Multidisciplinary Management of the Restorability of Compromised Teeth: A Case Report. J Cosm Dent 2015.
- Sarmiento HL, Norton M, Fiorellini JP. Development of a Classification System for Peri-Implant Diseases and Conditions. Int J Periodontics Restorative Dent. Int J Periodontics Restorative Dent. 2016 Sep-Oct;36(5):699-705. 2016.
- Abundo R, Corrente G, Lombardo S, Sarmiento H, Fiorellini JP, Perelli M. Un approccio razionale alla ricostruzione dei tessuti duri e molli in un caso di grave compromissione estetica: aspetti chirurgici della rigenerazione ossea con biomateriali, colla di fibrina e membrana di collagene cross-linked (A rational approach to hard and soft tissue reconstruction in a case of severe esthetic involvement: surgical aspects of bone regeneration with biomaterials, fibrin sealant and cross-linked collagen membrane) Numeri Uno 2016; 24(4): 23–26.
- Kubota A, Sarmiento H, Alqahtani M, Llobell A, Fiorellini J. The use of recombinant human Platelet-Derived Growth Factor for maxillary sinus augmentation. Int J Periodontics Restorative Dent. 2016 Nov/Dec;36(6):e88-e94. doi: 10.11607/prd.2830. 2016.
- Fiorellini J, Glindemann S, Salcedo J, Park CJ, Sarmiento H, Weber HP. The effect of osteopontin and an osteopontin-derived synthetic peptide coating on osseointegration of implants in a canine model. Int J Periodontics Restorative Dent. 2017 Mar/Apr; 37(2) : 219–225. doi: 10.11607/prd.2776.
- Zambelli M, Corrente G, Fiorellini JP, Sarmiento HL, Abundo R. Correlazione tra torque di inserimento e osteointegrazione/perdita ossea crestale (Correlation between insertion torque and osseointegration/crestal bone loss).
- Award winner for clinical research, 3rd Roberto Cornelini Prize, 13th International Congress on Implant Prosthodontics “Premium Day”, June 11–13, 2015, Padua (Italy).
- Corrente G, Abundo R, Sarmiento HL, Zambelli M, Saccone C, Fiorellini JP, Perelli M. Lembo riposizionato coronalmente e matrice di collagene nel trattamento di recessioni gengivali con minima quantità iniziale di tessuto cheratinizzato (1-2mm): risultati a un anno di uno studio prospettico (Coronally positioned flap and collagen matrix in the treatment of gingival recessions with minimum initial amount of keratinized tissue (1-2mm): 1-year results of a prospective study). Research Forum, 19th National Congress, S.I.d.P. (Italian Society of Periodontology), March 17–19, 2016, Turin (Italy).
- Perelli M, Abundo R, Corrente G, Saccone C, Sarmiento HL, Fiorellini JP. The Long Term Evaluation of Short Threaded Implants in the Posterior Mandible and Maxilla. Delayed versus Immediate Loading. 12th International Symposium on Periodontics and Restorative Dentistry, June 2016, Boston, Mass.
- Cho YS, Jeon JY, Jung GU, Park CJ, Sarmiento HL, Fiorellini JP. Radiologic Comparative Analysis between Saline and Venous Blood Filling after Hydraulic Lifting of Sinus Membrane without Bone Graft: A Randomized Case-Control Study. 12th International Symposium on Periodontics and Restorative Dentistry, June 2016, Boston, Mass.

=== Books ===
- Michael G. Newman, DDS, Henry Takei, DDS, Perry R. Klokkevold, DDS, MS and Fermin A. Carranza, Dr. Odont. Carranza's Clinical Periodontology: Expert Consult, 12th edition (clinical case presentation).
- Michael G. Newman, DDS, Henry Takei, DDS, Perry R. Klokkevold, DDS, MS and Fermin A. Carranza, Dr. Odont. Carranza's Clinical Periodontology: Expert Consult, 13th edition. (Co-Author)
