= Columbia University College of Dental Medicine =

Private dental college in Manhattan, New York

Coordinates: 40.841519°N 73.941139°W

- Type: Private
- Established: 1916
- Dean: Dennis Mitchell, DDS, MPH (Interim)
- Students: 380 Pre-Doctoral Students; 84 Post-Doctoral Students/Residents
- Location: New York, New York, U.S.
- Campus: Urban
- Website: www.dental.columbia.edu

The Columbia University College of Dental Medicine, often abbreviated CDM, is one of the 21 graduate and professional schools of Columbia University. It is located at 630 West 168th Street in Manhattan, New York City. According to American Dental Education Association, CDM is one of the most selective dental schools in the United States based on average DAT score, GPA, and acceptance rate. In 2025, 1,886 people applied for 92 positions in its entering class. The mean undergraduate GPA and average DAT score for the class entering Fall 2024 were 3.82 and 25.7, respectively.

== History ==
The College of Dental Medicine traces its origin to 1852, as the New York College of Dentistry, later the New York College of Dental and Oral Surgery. In 1916, Columbia University, recognizing dentistry as an integral part of the health sciences, established its own school of dental education and absorbed both the New York Post-graduate School of Dentistry and the New York School of Dental Hygiene, with a $100,000 gift from New York merchant James N. Jarvie. James F. Hasbrouck was among the founders of the Columbia University College of Dental and Oral Surgery in 1916. In keeping with the ideals of the American Association of Oral and Plastic Surgeons, the first two years of coursework at the new college were fully unified with Columbia's College of Physicians and Surgeons, of which Hasbrouck was an 1894 graduate. In 1923, the New York College of Dentistry merged with the New York College of Dental and Oral Surgery to form the present School of Dental and Oral Surgery of Columbia University. In January 2006, the School of Dental and Oral Surgery was renamed the Columbia University College of Dental Medicine.

== Education ==
The College of Dental Medicine at Columbia offers the following academic programs:

=== Pre-doctoral programs ===
- Doctor of Dental Surgery (DDS)
- Advanced Standing Program for Internationally Trained Dentists
- Dual Degree with the Mailman School of Public Health (DDS/MPH)
- Dual Degree with the Columbia Business School (DDS/MBA)
- Dual Degree with the Teachers College (DDS/MA in Science and Dental Education)
- Dual Degree with the Fu Foundation School of Engineering and Applied Science (DDS/PhD in Biomedical Engineering)

=== Post-doctoral programs ===
- Advanced Education in General Dentistry (AEGD)
- Endodontics Residency
- General Practice Residency (GPR)
- Oral and Maxillofacial Pathology Residency
- Oral and Maxillofacial Surgery/MD Residency
- Pediatric Dentistry Residency
- Orthodontics Residency
- Periodontics Residency
- Prosthodontics Residency

== Research ==
The College of Dental Medicine possesses several research facilities, including the Tissue Engineering and Regenerative Medicine Laboratory as well as the Center for Craniofacial Regeneration. The faculty engages in wide-ranging areas of research, from Oropharyngeal Cancer to Biomaterials/Regenerative Biology/Stem Cells, Neuroscience and Pain, Microbial Pathogenesis/Microbiome, Behavioral and Social Sciences/Population Oral Health, and Systemic and Oral Disease Interactions.

Columbia University has a long-standing, rich history in dental education and research. Dr. William John Gies (1872–1956), a professor of Biochemistry at the College of Physicians & Surgeons and a founder of the College of Dental Medicine, is recognized as a pioneer in the profession. He was an advocate for rigorous medical and scientific instruction in dental education. In the early 1950s the Birnberg Research Medal Award of the Dental Alumni of Columbia University was established to encourage dental research excellence and help stimulate public interest in support of dental research.

== Publications ==
The postgraduate periodontal clinic.

The College of Dental Medicine has produced a number of annual publications in its past:

- Primus: annual alumni magazine of the College of Dental Medicine
- Primus Notes: bi-annual newsletter of the College of Dental Medicine
- Columbia Dental Review: annual clinical publication of Columbia University College of Dental Medicine
- Journal of the William Jarvie Society: the Journal of the Student Honor and Research Society of the College of Dental Medicine
- College of Dental Medicine Bulletin: describes the mission, curriculum and courses of study at the College of Dental Medicine
- Dental Examiner: former publication of the Association of Dental Alumni, Columbia University College of Dental Medicine

== School facilities ==
The College of Dental Medicine is located on the campus of the Columbia University Medical Center/New York-Presbyterian Hospital.

== See also ==
- American Student Dental Association
- Columbia University
- Ivy League
- Dentistry
