= Postgraduate training in general dentistry in the United States =

There are two forms of institution-based training in general dentistry available for dental school graduates in the United States:

- General practice residency (GPR)
- Advanced education in general dentistry (AEGD)

== Program details ==
Both GPRs and AEGDs can be 1-year programs with an option available to continue for a second year or they may be a two-year program from the start. They allow the new dentist to further hone his or her skills in most of the traditionally defined disciplines of dentistry while at the same time increasing one's speed and refining one's techniques. These programs also afford trainees the opportunity to learn from the attending dentists who serve a supervisory role, something generally unavailable in private practice.

While a GPR is a hospital-based program, an AEGD is usually not and the differences between the two types of programs are generally a result of this distinction. Both types of programs afford the trainee with a larger patient pool than he or she was exposed to in dental school; while dental students will typically treat 2 or 3 patients a day in multiple-hour-long sessions, these postgraduate programs are constructed so that trainees may see anywhere from 8-15 patients a day, or even more.

Programs will often emphasize the importance of managing comprehensive dental treatment plans and adjusting them based on the patient's medical condition. During training, residents may be faced with the task of managing patients that require dentistry in a hospital setting due to a compromised medical condition. Medical management of dental patients may be emphasized in weekly grand rounds and rotations through anesthesia, internal medicine, and the hospital emergency department. Some programs also provide rotations in family medicine and otolarnyology.

These rotations not only increase the trainee's knowledge and experience, but also allows physicians, resident or attending, to see how dentistry and medicine are related, allowing for a better referral relationship in future practices. This relationship is best demonstrated in tumor boards where both medical and dental residents discuss and treatment plan head and neck cancer patients.

In general, GPR programs pay higher stipends than do AEGD programs; this is because GPR residents take call and answer consults. While on call, the residents are expected to manage head and neck trauma reporting to the ER in accordance with hospital guidelines.

GPR residents may also become familiar with performing dental/oral surgical procedures in the operating room and managing the patient's stay while in the hospital. Rotation through the dental specialties increases the resident's ability to handle situations in private practice without referral to a specialist.

In both programs, the basic skills learned in dental school are improved significantly, preparing the dentist for a career in private practice or for a specialty residency program. Residents may work closely with oral and maxillofacial surgeons, allowing them to improve their skills in oral surgical procedures. Under the direct supervision of the oral surgeons, residents may expand their understanding of and increase their skill in third molar extraction, biopsy technique, pathology recognition and treatment planning in facial cosmetic and trauma surgery. Both types of programs will usually feature lecture series to further develop the knowledge that trainees received from their respective dental schools.

== Application process ==
Applications are generally filled out at the beginning of the senior year of dental school. As with most specialty programs, GPR and AEGD programs utilize the Postdoctoral Application Support Service (PASS) operated and managed by the American Dental Education Association (ADEA). The PASS system allows all applicants to fill out a single form that is then efficiently distributed to the programs selected by the applicant. Similarly, single copies of secondary application material, such as letters of recommendation, National Board scores and the like, can be sent to PASS, which then certifies the authenticity of the copied versions it distributes to the selected programs. Overall, it allows for a more streamlined process of application over most any alternative method.

After applications are in, programs will usually contact prospective candidates for interviews. After interviews are complete, the programs and the candidates will utilize the Postdoctoral Dental Matching Program, abbreviated as "the Match," to rank each other in order of preference. After the due date, a computerized algorithm sets up each candidate with the program that he or she ranked highest, although this explanation is oversimplified. For those candidates who do not match at any program, there is a "post-match" period during which programs which maintain open spots attempt to fill them on a case-by-case basis with candidates who did not match to a program.

== State licensure ==
Some states require a postgraduate training program to meet requirements for licensure. For example, as of January 1, 2007, New York State requires that new dentists complete either a GPR, an AEGD or a specialty residency prior to receiving their dental license.

== Program examples ==
- GPR program at NJDS
- GPR program at MCG School of Dentistry
- AEGD program at Columbia CDM
