= VCU School of Dentistry =

Dental school in Richmond, Virginia, US

Coordinates: 37°32′30.7″N 77°25′45.1″W

- Type: Public university
- Established: 1893
- Parent institution: Virginia Commonwealth University
- Dean: Jeffery Johnson (Interim)
- Location: Richmond, Virginia, United States
- Campus: MCV Campus
- Website: dentistry.vcu.edu

Virginia Commonwealth University School of Dentistry is the dental school of Virginia Commonwealth University. Located in the United States city of Richmond. The school opened in 1893. It is the only dental school in Virginia and is one of five schools within the VCU Medical Center.

== History ==
Virginia Commonwealth University School of Dentistry is a part of Virginia Commonwealth University. The school was established in 1893.

== Departments ==
- Department of Endodontics
- Department of General Practice
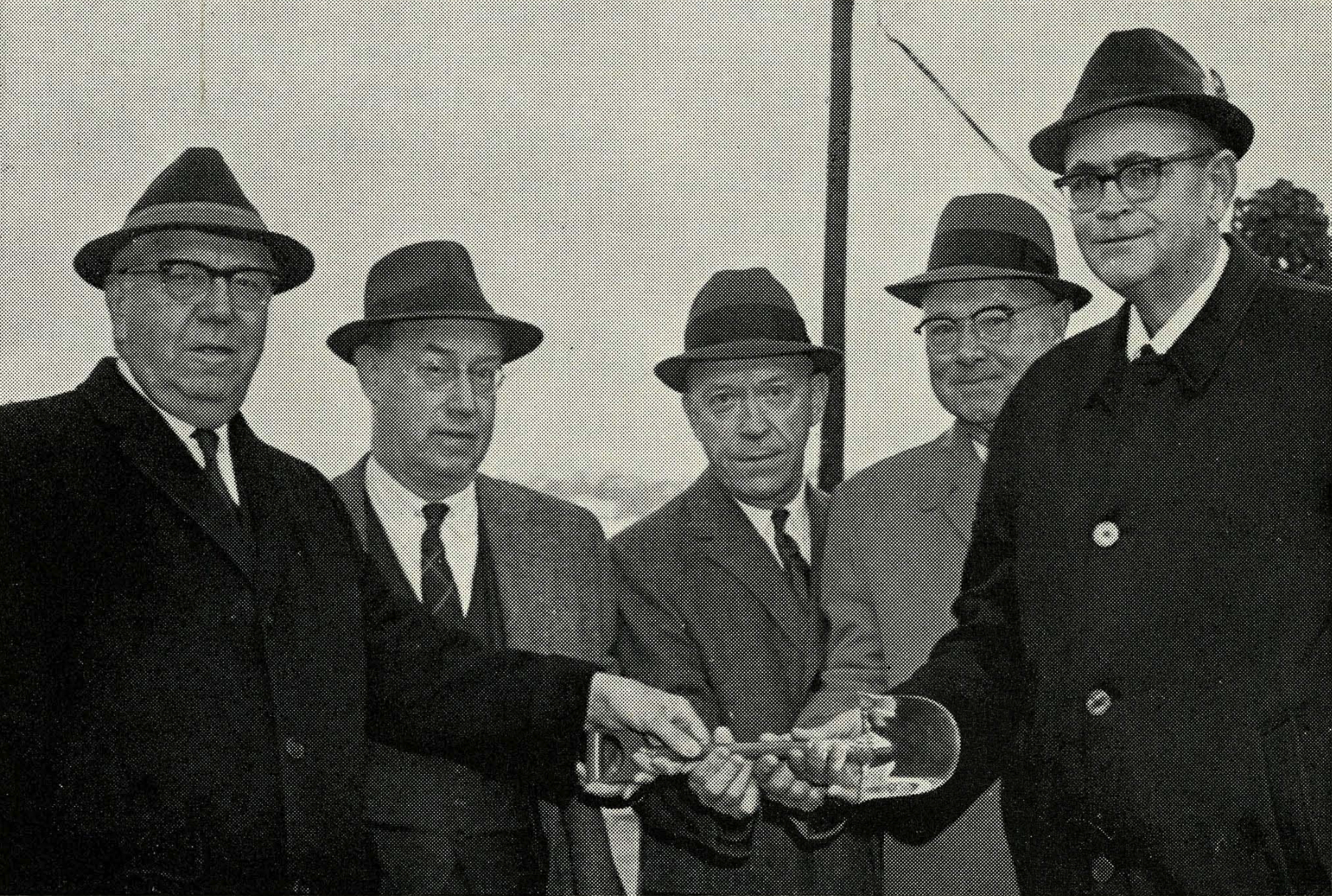
  Ground breaking of the Dental School (1967)
- Department of Oral Health Promotion and Community Outreach
- Department of Oral and Maxillofacial Surgery
- Department of Oral Diagnostic Sciences
- Department of Orthodontics
- Department of Pediatric Dentistry
- Department of Periodontics
- Department of Prosthodontics
- Philips Institute for Oral Health Research

== Accreditation ==
Virginia Commonwealth University School of Dentistry is currently accredited by ADA.

== Notable faculty ==
- John A. DiBiaggio, dean 1970–1976, later president of the University of Connecticut, Michigan State University and Tufts University
- Daniel M. Laskin, oral and maxillofacial surgeon and educator

== See also ==
- American Student Dental Association
