= William John Gies =

American biochemist and dentist

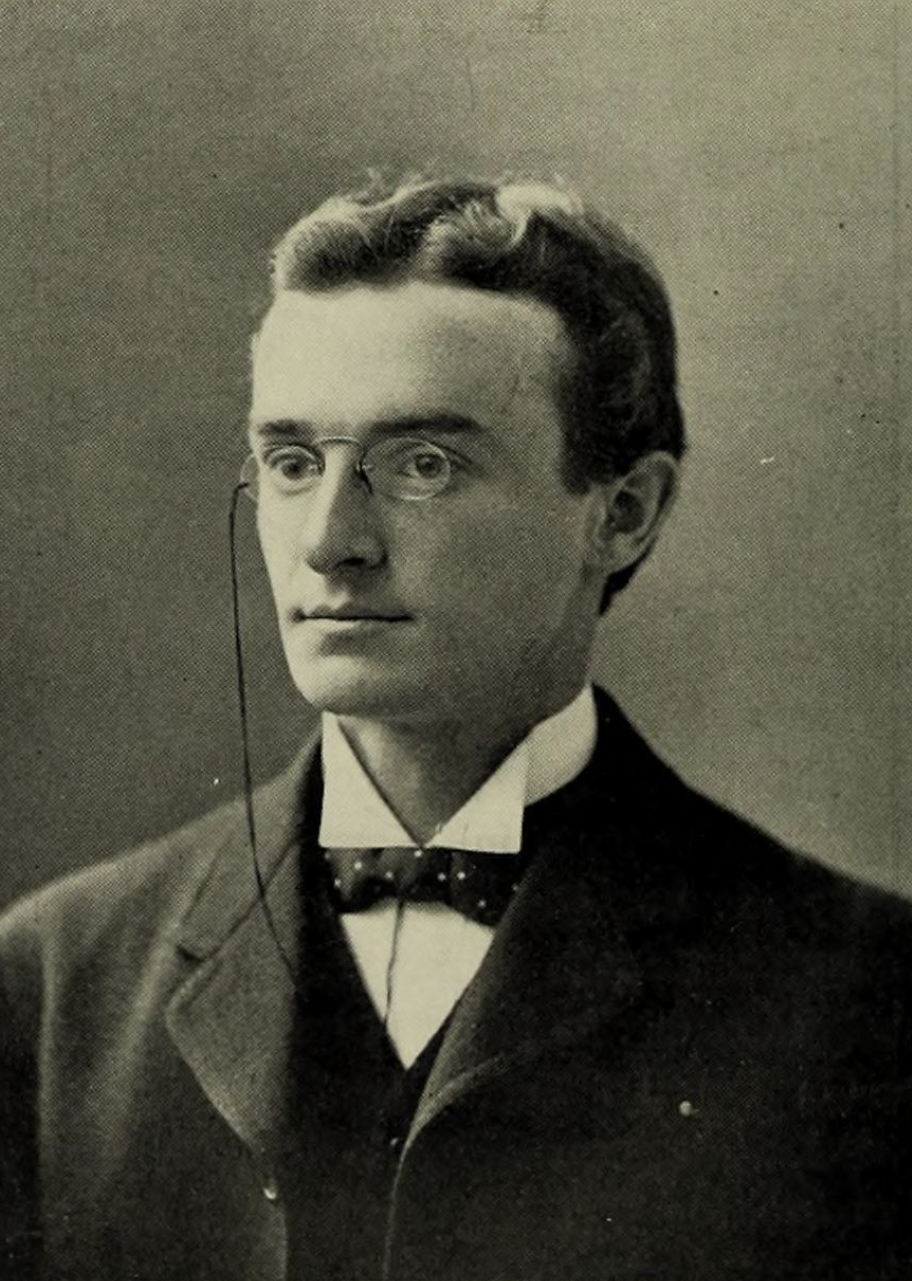
- Born: February 21, 1872; Reisterstown, Maryland
- Died: May 20, 1956 (aged 84)
- Education: Gettysburg College, B.S. (1893), M.S. (1896); Yale Scientific School, Ph.B. (1894); Yale University, Ph.D. (1897)
- Occupations: Biochemist; dentist
- Founded: Columbia University School of Dentistry

William John Gies (February 21, 1872 – May 20, 1956) was an American biochemist and dentist.

Gies was born February 21, 1872, in Reisterstown, Maryland. He received his B.S. at Gettysburg College in 1893, Ph.B. at the Yale Scientific School in 1894, M.S. from Gettysburg in 1896, and Ph.D. at Yale University in 1897.

In 1899 he started teaching at Columbia University. He co-founded the School of Dentistry at Columbia, leading to the creation of the American Association of Dental Schools. He was elected to the American Philosophical Society in 1915. He published a landmark report in 1926 on Dental Education in the US and Canada.
