= List of Ohio Wesleyan University people =

Coordinates: 40.2967°N 83.0667°W

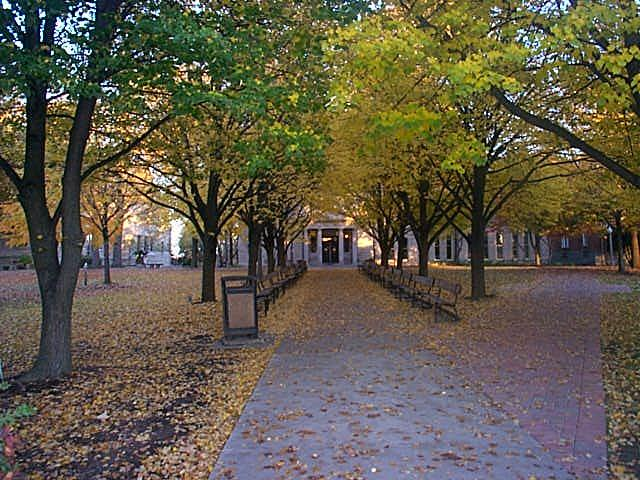
Ohio Wesleyan University campus

This is a list of notable people affiliated with Ohio Wesleyan University, including graduates, former students, and former professors. Some noted current faculty are also listed in the main university article. Individuals are sorted by category and alphabetized within each category.

== Academia ==
- Guy Potter Benton – president of Miami University, University of Vermont and University of the Philippines
- Isaac Crook, Class of 1856 – president of Ohio University
- Ed Folsom, Class of 1969 – Roy J. Carver Professor Emeritus of English at University of Iowa; co-founder of Waof lt Whitman Archive
- George Richmond Grose – president of Depauw University
- William Hsiao, Class of 1963 – professor of economics at the Harvard University School of Public Health
- Edwin Holt Hughes – president of Depauw University
- Mary King, Class of 1962 – professor of Peace and Conflict Studies at the United Nations affiliated University for Peace
- Shriram Krishnamurthi, Class of 1993 – computer science professor at Brown University
- Hazel Marie Losh, Class of 1920 – astronomer and first woman to be a tenured astronomy professor at the University of Michigan
- Alexander Brown Mackie, 1916 – founder of Brown Mackie College
- Francis John McConnell – president of Depauw University
- Edward D. Miller, MD 1964 – chief executive officer of Johns Hopkins Medicine
- James B. Preston — professor and chairman of the Department of Physiology at SUNY Upstate Medical University
- F. Sherwood Rowland (Class of 1948–1995) – Nobel laureate in Chemistry; professor of chemistry at the University of California, Irvine
- Ram Samudrala, 1993 – professor and chief of the Department of Biomedical Informatics, University at Buffalo
- Robert P. Smith – pastor, chancellor and president of Montana Wesleyan University; president of Kansas Wesleyan
- Robert M. Stein – Lena Gohlman Fox Professor of political science and dean of Rice University School of Social Sciences
- Ram Samudrala, Class of 1993 – professor of computational biology and bioinformatics at the University at Buffalo
- Thomas R. Tritton – president of Haverford College
- Ezra Vogel, Class of 1950 – professor emeritus o Harvard University; author of Japan as Number One (1979)

== Art ==
- Jim Berry, Class of 1955 – national newspaper cartoonist
- Matt Furie, Class of 2001 – creator of Pepe the Frog
- Art Sansom, Class of 1942 – creator of the daily comic strip The Born Loser
- Salman Toor, Class of 2006 – painter
- JoAnn Verburg, Class of 1972 – photographer

== Business ==
- Ralph F. Burns, Class of 1935 – executive secretary of Alpha Sigma Phi from 1936 to 1976
- Daniel Glaser, Class of 1982 – CEO of Marsh & McLennan Companies
- Ira A. Lipman – founder and chairman of Guardsmark, later vice chairman of AlliedBarton.
- Orra E. Monnette, Class of 1897 – author; banker; co-founder and co-chairman of Bank of America, Los Angeles
- James J. Nance, Class of 1923 – CEO of Hotpoint, Zenith and Packard Motors; vice-president of Ford Motor Company's Mercury-Edsel-Lincoln Division
- Frank Stanton, Class of 1930 – CEO of CBS, 1945–1973

== Entertainment ==
- Tyler Christopher Baker, attended 1991–93 – actor known fr General Hospital, Into the West, The Lying Game, and Days of Our Lives
- Fred Baron, Class of 1976 – producer of Moulin Rouge; creator/executive producer of According to Bex
- Jim Graner, attended 1937–39 – weeknight TV sports anchor for WKYC TV-3; radio color commentator for the Cleveland Browns
- Clark Gregg, Class of 1984 – actor, director, and screenwriter, known for The New Adventures of Old Christine, Marvel's Agents of SHIELD, What Lies Beneath, The West Wing, and The Avengers
- Fritz Kiersch, Class of 1974 – director, writer, and producer known for Children of the Corn and Tuff Turf
- George Kirgo, attended 1944–45 – screenwriter, author, and humorist
- Ron Leibman, Class of 1958 – Emmy Award and Tony Award-winning actor, known for Angels in America, Norma Rae, Slaughterhouse Five, and Friends
- Wendie Malick, Class of 1972 – film and television actor known for Just Shoot Me, Dream On, The American President, and Hot in Cleveland
- Robert Pine, Class of 1963 – Television and film actor, CHiPs, Murder, She Wrote, Hoover vs. the Kennedys, and Six Feet Under
- Byron Pitts, Class of 1982 – ABC News Nightline co-anchor
- Trish Van Devere – actress known for One Is a Lonely Number, Messenger of Death, and Hollywood Vice Squad
- Melvin Van Peebles, Class of 1953 – actor and director known for Sweet Sweetback's Baadasssss Song

== Law ==
- Michael van der Veen – attorney for President Donald Trump

== Literature ==
- Eleanor Hoyt Brainerd – novelist and editor of the early 20th century
- Mariana Gosnell – science journalist and book author
- Mary Bigelow Ingham – writer, educator, social reformer
- Francis Beverly Kelley – author of Clown, It Was Better Than Work
- Robert E. Lee, Class of 1939 – playwright and lyricist
- Judith McCulloh, B.A. – folklorist, ethnomusicologist, and university press editor
- James Oberg, Class of 1966 – author, space engineer in NASA, space journalist and historian
- Richard North Patterson, Class of 1968 – author
- Norman Vincent Peale, class of 1920 – author of The Power of Positive Thinking; founder of Guideposts magazine; host of NBC radio's The Art of Living
- Imad Rahman – fiction writer, author of I Dream of Microwaves
- Maggie Smith, Class of 1999 – poet, freelance writer, and editor
- Benjamin T. Spencer – author of The Quest for Nationality
- May Alden Ward, Class of 1872 – author
- Martha Wintermute (1842–1918) – author and poet

== Politics ==
- Horace Newton Allen, Class of 1878 – diplomat
- Kathryn Barger, Class of 1983 – Los Angeles County's Fifth District supervisor
- William G. Batchelder, Class of 1966 – Ohio House of Representatives
- Hiram Pitt Bennet – Speaker of the Nebraska Territorial House of Representatives; Colorado secretary of state
- James A. Boucher – Wyoming House of Representatives
- Samuel G. Cosgrove – Governor of Washington
- Charles Vernon Culver – U.S. House of Representatives
- Samuel Hitt Elbert, Class of 1854 – Governor of the Territory of Colorado; justice of the Colorado Supreme Court
- Jo Ann Emerson – U.S. House of Representatives
- Charles Fairbanks, Class of 1872 – Vice President of the United States
- Arthur Flemming, Class of 1927 – United States Secretary of Health, Education, and Welfare; president of University of Oregon, Ohio Wesleyan University, and Macalester College
- Joseph B. Foraker – Governor of Ohio ,United States Senator
- George Benson Fox, 1861; honorary degree 1909 – Ohio General Assembly, American Civil War officer
- Paul Gillmor – U.S. House of Representatives and President of the Ohio Senate
- Nehemiah Green – Governor of Kansas and Lieutenant Governor of Kansas
- John Marshall Hamilton – Governor of Illinois, Lieutenant Governor of Illinois, and Illinois Senate
- Lucy Webb Hayes, Class of 1850 – First Lady of the United States
- Myron T. Herrick – Governor of Ohio and U.S. Ambassador to France
- John Wesley Hoyt – Governor of Wyoming Territory
- John W. McCormick – U.S. House of Representatives
- Masa Nakayama, Class of 1916 – Japanese Minister of Health and Welfare and House of Representatives (Japan)
- Rudolph Schlabach – Wisconsin State Assembly and Wisconsin State Senate
- William Eugene Stanley – Governor of Kansas and Kansas House of Representatives
- George Washington Steele – Governor of Oklahoma Territory and U.S. House of Representatives
- Shirin R, Tahir-Kheli, Class of 1961 – first Ambassador for women's empowerment

== Religion ==
- Charles Wesley Brashares, 1914 – a bishop of the Methodist Church
- Orville Nave – author of Nave's Topical Bible
- Nathan Sites, graduated in 1859 – Methodist Episcopal missionary stationed at Fuzhou, China
- Ralph Washington Sockman – author; host of NBC's National Radio Pulpit, 1928–1962; minister of Christ Church, Methodist, New York City, 1916–1961

== Science and medicine ==
- Helen Blair Bartlett, Class of 1927 – geologist and mineralogist
- Hü King Eng, Class of 1888 – physician, second Chinese woman to attend university in the US
- Gerald May, 1962 – psychiatrist and theologian

== Social activists ==
- Mabel Cratty, Class of 1890 – leader of Young Women's Christian Association in its early days
- Kenyon Farrow, Class of 1997 – executive director of Queers for Economic Justice
- Mildred Gillars, Class of 1918 and 1973 – broadcaster of Nazi propaganda under the name "Axis Sally" during World War II; convicted of treason and incarcerated
- Kim Ransa – Korean independence activist and feminist

== Sports ==
- John Barry Clemens, non-graduate – professional basketball player with the New York Knicks, the Chicago Bulls, the Seattle SuperSonics, the Cleveland Cavaliers, and the Portland Trail Blazers
- Tim Corbin, Class of 1984 – college baseball coach for Vanderbilt Commodores baseball
- Scott Googins, Class of 1992 – college baseball coach for Xavier
- George Little, Class of 1912 – football coach for University of Cincinnati, Miami University, University of Michigan and University of Wisconsin–Madison
- Branch Rickey, Class of 1904 – general manager of the Saint Louis Cardinals, Brooklyn Dodgers, and Pittsburgh Pirates; pioneered the farm system and racially integrated Major League Baseball by signing Jackie Robinson for the Dodgers
- Keith Rucker, Class of 1993 – professional football player with the Cincinnati Bengals, Philadelphia Eagles, Washington Redskins, and Kansas City Chiefs
- Phil "Lefty" Saylor, Class of 1890 – college baseball and football player
- Olin Smith – professional football player with the Cleveland Bulldogs
- Ed Westfall – professional football player with the Boston Braves/Redskins and the Pittsburgh Pirates
