= List of Pace University people =

The following is a list of people associated with Pace University, including current and former faculty members, alumni, students, and others:

== Presidents of Pace ==
President	From	To
Homer S. Pace and Charles A. Pace (joint-partnership as a proprietary business institute)	1906	1935
Homer S. Pace	1935	1942
Robert S. Pace	1942	1960
Edward J. Mortola	1960	1984
William G. Sharwell	1984	1990
Patricia O'Donnell-Ewers	1990	2000
David A. Caputo	2000	2007
Stephen J. Friedman	2007	2017
Marvin Krislov	2017	Present

== Notable faculty ==
- Charles A. Agemian - professor of Business; banker; former executive vice president of Chase Manhattan Bank; former chairman and CEO of Hackensack Trust Corp. (renamed Garden State National Bank)
- Jacob M. Appel - bioethicist and euthanasia advocate (former faculty)
- Murray Banks - head of Psychology department (former faculty)
- Peter Fingesten - founding chairman of the Art department
- Ira Joe Fisher - CBS broadcaster; Student Success Coordinator at Pace University's Center for Academic Excellence in Pleasantville
- Harold Holzer - former professor of history; senior vice president for external affairs, Metropolitan Museum of Art; co-chairman, U.S. 2009 Abraham Lincoln Bicentennial Commission, appointed by President Clinton in September 2000, and elected co-chairman in 2001
- Matthew Humphreys - actor and head of the BFA Acting for Film, Television, Voice-overs, and Commercials program (FTVC) within the Pace School of Performing Arts (PPA)
- Robert F. Kennedy, Jr. - alumnus; professor emeritus of Environmental Law; radio host, Ring of Fire; U.S. secretary of health and human services, former New York City assistant district attorney
- William Kunstler - civil rights attorney, associate professor of Law (1951–1963)
- Ryan Scott Oliver - award-winning composer and professor for BFA Musical Theatre program
- Richard Ottinger - former member of the United States House of Representatives; Professor of Environmental Studies; co-director of Pace's Center for Environmental Legal Studies
- Rob Redding - talk host, journalist, author and artist
- David Siegel - Lubin Adjunct Professor of Venture Capital and Entrepreneurship; former CEO of Investopedia
- Valentine Rossilli Winsey - anthropologist and women's rights activist

== Notable alumni ==
(*did not graduate)

=== Arts and letters ===
- Tessa Bailey - romance novelist
- David Ehrenstein - journalist; film critic
- Marv Goldberg - music historian in the field of rhythm & blues
- Jeff Rubens - statistician; co-editor of The Bridge World
- Destiny Wagner - Miss Earth 2021

=== Business ===
- Philip C. Abramo - financial fraudster, white-collar crime boss and DeCavalcante crime family Caporegime, known as "the King of Wall Street"
- Frank A. Calderoni - chief executive officer of Anaplan
- Telfar Clemens - fashion designer and entrepreneur
- Ariane de Rothschild - on board of directors of Compagnie Financière Edmond de Rothschild and Banque privée Edmond de Rothschild; wife of Baron Benjamin de Rothschild
- Richard Grasso* - chairman and CEO (1995–2003) of the New York Stock Exchange
- Herbert L. Henkel - chairman, Ingersoll-Rand; former president & CEO
- Kevin Huang - CEO, Pixel Interactive Media in Asia
- Jeff Jacobson - vice president of Kodak; COO of Kodak's Graphic Communications Group; president of Kodak's Graphic Solutions & Services
- Robin Bennett Kanarek - nurse, philanthropist, and author
- Barry Klarberg - minority owner of the New York Yankees and talent manager
- Edward D. Miller - on board of directors, American Express; former president and CEO of AXA; former senior vice chairman, Chase Manhattan; former president, Chemical Banking Corporation
- Rosemary Vrablic - managing director and senior private banker of Deutsche Bank's US private wealth management business
- Allen Weisselberg - CFO of The Trump Organization

=== Engineering and technology ===
- Herbert L. Henkel - chairman, president and CEO, Ingersoll-Rand Company, Ltd.
- Ivan G. Seidenberg - former president and CEO of Verizon; benefactor and trustee; namesake of Pace's Seidenberg School of Computer Science & Information Systems

=== Entertainment ===
- Ailee - Korean-American singer, based in South Korea
- Michelle Borth - actress, known for Hawaii Five-0
- Christopher Briney - actor, known for his role as Conrad Fisher in The Summer I Turned Pretty
- Kate Bristol - voice actress
- Paul Dano - actor
- Dominique Fishback - actress and playwright
- Celia Rose Gooding* - actress; known for originating the role of Frankie Healy in Jagged Little Pill
- Yuhua Hamasaki - drag queen
- Meaghan Jarensky - Miss New York USA 2005; Miss USA finalist
- Jesse James Keitel - actor; known for her role as Ruthie in Queer As Folk
- Cooper Koch - actor; Primetime Emmy Award nominee for his role as Erik Menendez in Monsters: The Lyle and Erik Menendez Story
- Jarah Mariano - international model
- Tommy Nelson* - actor; known for his role as Neil in the biopic My Friend Dahmer and Russell in The Cat and the Moon
- Vincent Pastore* - actor; best known for his role in The Sopranos as Salvatore "Big Pussy" Bonpensiero
- Alfred Preisser - co-founder and director, with Christopher McElroen, of The Classical Theatre of Harlem
- Rachael Ray* - television celebrity chef, 30 Minute Meals
- Diana Scarwid - actress; Academy Award nominee and Emmy nominee
- Larry Saperstein - actor; known for his role as Big Red in High School Musical: The Musical: The Series
- Rafael L. Silva - actor; known for his role as Carlos Reyes in 9-1-1: Lone Star
- Glenn Taranto - actor; known for his role as Gomez Addams in The Addams Family

=== Media and communications ===
- Mel Karmazin - CEO, Sirius Satellite Radio; former president and CEO, CBS; former COO, Viacom
- Mary O'Grady - editorial board, Wall Street Journal
- Ken Rudin - NPR's Political Editor

=== Politics and public service ===
- Fr. John Corapi - television host, EWTN; Roman Catholic priest ordained by Pope John Paul II
- James E. Davis - New York City Council member and community activist
- Jim Dunnigan* - military wargame designer
- Charles Dyson - businessman and philanthropist; special consultant to the secretary of war; former U.S. Air Force colonel; recipient of the Distinguished Service Medal and Order of the British Empire Commander's Badge; former executive vice president, Textron; founder and former chairman of the Dyson Foundation and the Dyson Kissner-Moran Corporation (now DKM Corp); benefactor and trustee; namesake of Pace's Dyson Hall and Dyson College of Arts and Sciences
- Naomi Caplan Matusow - former New York state assemblywoman, New York State Assembly
- Chris Meek - founder of SoldierStrong
- Kash Patel - director of the Federal Bureau of Investigation
- Roxanne Persaud - New York state senator from the 19th district
- Philip T. Sica - former marshal of the City of New York (mayoral appointment by John V. Lindsay); Republican nominee, Queens borough president
- Andrea Stewart-Cousins - temporary president and majority leader of the New York State Senate
- Caroline Van Zile - 3rd solicitor general of Washington, D.C.

=== Sports ===
- Edward W. Stack - chairman (1977–2000) and current member, National Baseball Hall of Fame board of directors

== Notable alumni from the Elisabeth Haub School of Law ==
- Ruth Noemí Colón - 66th secretary of state of New York
- Philip Foglia (deceased) - former prosecutor and Italian American civic rights activist
- Philip M. Halpern - judge of the United States District Court for the Southern District of New York; adjunct professor at Pace Law School
- Robert F. Kennedy Jr. - 26th U.S. secretary of health and human services
- Kieran Lalor - former member of the New York State Assembly
- Malachy E. Mannion - senior status U.S. district judge, Middle District of Pennsylvania
- James A. Murphy III - former district attorney for Saratoga County, New York, acting judge of the trial-level court of general jurisdiction in New York, judge of the county court of Saratoga County
- George Oros - former chief of staff to Westchester County Executive Robert Astorino, former Westchester County legislator
- Kash Patel - attorney and 9th director of the Federal Bureau of Investigation, former chief of staff to U.S. secretary of defense
- David M. Rosen - professor of anthropology
