= Nebraska Wesleyan University =

Methodist university in Lincoln, Nebraska, US

Coordinates: 40.83925°N 96.65095°W

- Motto: Pro Christo et Ecclesia
- Type: Private university
- Established: 1887
- Affiliations: IAMSCU; NAICU; Annapolis Group
- Religious affiliation: United Methodist
- Endowment: $56.35 million
- President: Darrin Good
- Faculty: 107 Full-time and 73 Part-time
- Students: 1,688
- Undergraduates: 1,545
- Postgraduates: 143
- Location: Lincoln, Nebraska, United States
- Campus: 50 acres (20 ha)
- Colors: Black & Gold
- Nickname: Prairie Wolves
- Sporting affiliations: NCAA – Division III – ARC
- Website: nebrwesleyan.edu
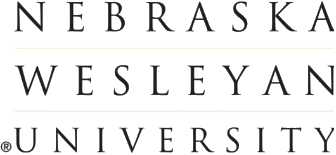

Nebraska Wesleyan University (NWU) is a private Methodist-affiliated university in Lincoln, Nebraska, United States. It was founded in 1887 by Nebraska Methodists. As of 2017, it had approximately 2,100 students, including 1,500 full-time students and 300 faculty and staff. The university offers 119 undergraduate majors, minors, and pre-professional programs in addition to three graduate programs.

== History ==
Nebraska Wesleyan University was originally announced in 1886 and was a replacement for the former Methodist college of the same name. The university was formed by the Methodist Church in Nebraska and was located in the former town of University Place, which was later annexed by Lincoln. The university officially opened in October 1888, with the completion of its first building, now known as Old Main. Wesleyan opened as the only Methodist university in the state and had a single building with a 40 acres (16 ha) campus.

In 1933, the Nebraska Wesleyan University changed its nickname from the Coyotes to the Plainsmen. In 1971, the university's Board of Governors adopted a new code of conduct, known as a Student Bill of Rights. The code was developed for three years prior to its passing and was done to give greater freedom to students political views. In 2000, the university changed its mascot again, this time to the Prairie Wolves. The name change was done to respect gender identity and ethnicity.

== Campus ==
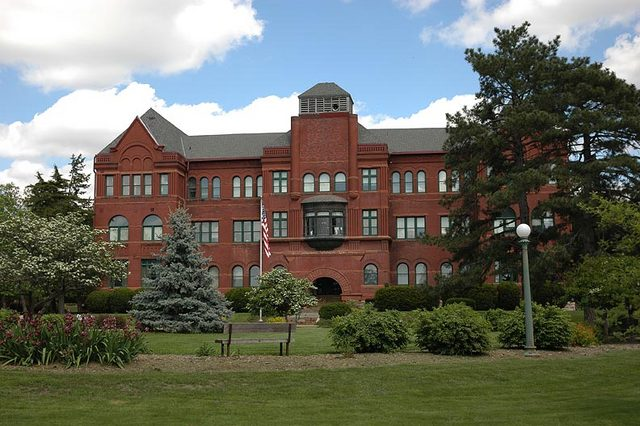
Old Main in 2007

Nebraska Wesleyan University's campus is located in Lincoln, Nebraska. Its first and oldest building, built in 1888, is commonly referred to as Old Main. Old Main was listed on the National Register of Historic Places on May 21, 1975. The university includes 15 academic buildings and 20 housing units. Nebraska Wesleyan's athletic facilities include Abel Stadium, which seats approximately 2,500 people and is used for college football, soccer and other events, and Snyder Arena, which seats 2,350 and is used for basketball and volleyball.

== Academics ==
Undergraduate demographics as of 2025
Race and ethnicity	Total
White	74%
Hispanic	11%
Native American	1%
Asian	2%
International student	3%
Black	4%
Two or more races	4%
Unknown	2%
Economic diversity
Low-income (Note: The percentage of students who received an income-based federal Pell grant intended for low-income students.)	29%
Affluent (Note: The percentage of students who are a part of the American middle class at the bare minimum.)	71%

Nebraska Wesleyan University is a private Methodist College. As of 2025, the university has 1,500 students enrolled. The university includes 43 undergraduate fields of study. Major fields of study include Biology, Health and Physical Education, Business/Commerce, Registered Nursing, and Drama/Theatre Arts and Stagecraft.

== Athletics ==
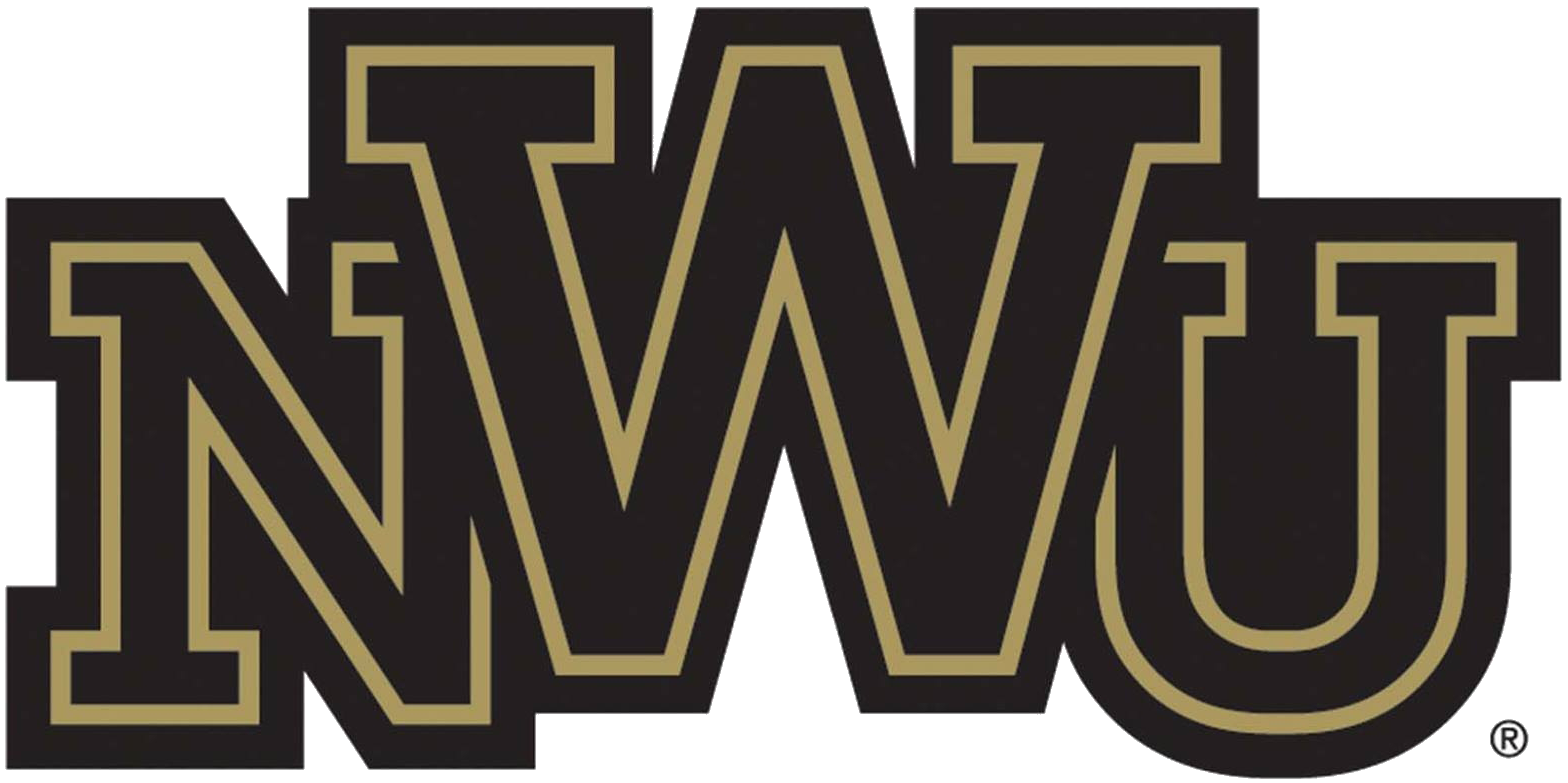
Athletics logo

The Nebraska Wesleyan athletic teams are called the Prairie Wolves. The university is a member of the NCAA Division III ranks, primarily competing in the American Rivers Conference (ARC; formerly known as the Iowa Intercollegiate Athletic Conference (IIAC), since the 2016–17 academic year. The Prairie Wolves previously competed in the Great Plains Athletic Conference (GPAC) of the National Association of Intercollegiate Athletics (NAIA) from 1969–70 to 2015–16; as well as an NCAA D-III Independent while holding dual affiliation membership with the NAIA and the NCAA from 1982 to 2016. It was during their time in the GPAC Wesleyan played their traditional rival Doane University in nearby Crete, Nebraska.

Nebraska Wesleyan competes in 21 intercollegiate varsity sports. Men's sports include baseball, basketball, cross country, football, golf, soccer, swimming, tennis, track & field and wrestling. Women's sports include basketball, cheerleading, cross country, dance, golf, soccer, swimming, softball, tennis, track & field and volleyball. Former sports included women's bowling.

=== Accomplishments ===
The men's golf team won the 2006 NCAA Division III National Championship, its first in men's golf. The Prairie Wolves won by 10 strokes over the University of Redlands. The men's golf team has also won 35 conference championships; with back-to-back championships in 2018 and 2019. The men's basketball team won the 2018 NCAA Division III National Championship, its first in men's basketball.

== Notable alumni ==
- Kate Bolz, former Nebraska State Senator
- Shawn Bouwens, football player
- Ralph G. Brooks, 29th governor of Nebraska
- Carl T. Curtis, former United States Senator
- Sandy Dennis, Oscar-winning actress
- John R. Dunning, physicist in the Manhattan Project
- Mignon Eberhart, mystery novelist
- Rick Evans, singer and guitarist, writer of hit "In the Year 2525" as part of group Zager and Evans
- Ted Genoways, poet and former Virginia Quarterly Review editor
- John M. Gerrard, current Judge for the Federal District of Nebraska
- Gene V Glass, Regents' Professor Emeritus at Arizona State University, social scientist
- Dwight Griswold, former United States Senator and Governor of Nebraska
- Mary Lou Harkness, university library director
- Kent Haruf, novelist
- Minnie Throop England, economist
- Robert Hilkemann, Nebraska State Senator
- Harry Huge, international lawyer
- Lew Hunter, screenwriter and Chair Emeritus of UCLA Film Department
- Emily Kinney, television and theater actress (The Walking Dead)
- Lowen Kruse, minister and former Nebraska State Senator
- Jason Licht, general manager of NFL's Tampa Bay Buccaneers
- James Moeller, former Vice Chief Justice, Arizona State Supreme Court
- Bess Gearhart Morrison, Chautauqua speaker
- James Munkres, Professor Emeritus of Mathematics at MIT
- Orville Nave, author of Nave's Topical Bible
- John N. Norton, former United States Representative
- Marian Price, former Nebraska State Senator
- Robert Reed, science-fiction writer
- Ed Schrock, former Nebraska State Senator
- Coleen Seng, former Mayor of Lincoln, 2003–2007
- Warren K. Urbom, former Chief Judge for the Federal District of Nebraska
- Antwan Wilson, school administrator

== See also ==
- Alice Abel Arboretum
