= Joe Fernandez (businessman) =

Cuban American businessman

- Born: September 28, 1977 (age 48); Las Vegas, Nevada
- Occupations: Member of board of directors for Lithium Technologies, founder of Joymode, founder of Klout

Joe Fernandez is a Cuban American businessman most well known for his work on the social media company Klout. He attended, but did not graduate from, the University of Miami. He moved to New York City where he met his wife. He had several jobs at several companies, including Adjoined Technologies, Onboard Informatics, and Evalulogix, the latter which he co-founded. Fernandez underwent jaw surgery at the age of 30, which contributed to his idea for Klout due to his inability to speak. He started Klout in New York City, and the website launched on December 24, 2008. On March 27, 2014, it was announced that Lithium Technologies had purchased the website from Fernandez. Fernandez revealed on April 17, 2015 that he was stepping down from his position as CEO of Klout, which would then be manned by Lithium. He later joined Lithium as one of its board of directors. As a result of some of the changes made by Fernandez and his staff to the way Klout scores work, Fernandez came under criticism. Particularly, people were upset that their scores lowered after the way scores are determined changed. This led to Fernandez's cell phone number being leaked and him receiving death threats.

== Career ==
Fernandez began his career working as a web developer for Adjoined Technologies from 2000 to 2001, but lost his job after the dot com bubble burst occurred. He met the co-founder by chance, who was a school psychologist, shortly after the No Child Left Behind act had passed. The co-founder took issue with how much paperwork he had to do and how it prevented him from helping children. The two of them worked to make the company in order to create software that helps schools deal with paperwork. At its peak, the company's paperwork software was being used in 80% of schools in the United States. While the startup was not a major success, the Arkansas-based company Computer Automation System paid Fernandez and his co-workers royalties for their product. His next job was as a director for research and innovation at Onboard Informatics. Fernandez was a standout at WorldLink media both as a computer programmer and at Cupball. A game created among Joe and three other employees. Joe's ideas and inspiration springboarded the games popularity during the Shaq/Kobe years in Los Angeles. Fernandez's idea for Klout came from being bedridden during his recovery from jaw surgery in 2007, as he had been using Twitter as his means for communication and came up with the idea of measurable influence through this experience. The name "Klout" came as he wrote it down on a piece of paper while delirious from pain relievers. After coming up with the idea for the website, Fernandez quit his job at Onboard Information in order to pursue it. He went to Singapore in order to start up the business, using his own money to hire a team to work on the website. Fernandez was in talks with the former owner of Klout.com to purchase the domain name, but was having difficulties coming to terms on price with him. He met with the domain name owner in person to offer him $5,000 for the domain, which he accepted. The website launched on December 24, 2008. Initially, Fernandez handled the scores of Klout users manually by himself. In 2012, Fernandez was able to raise $30 million in funding. On March 27, 2014, it was announced that Lithium Technologies had purchased Klout from Fernandez. On April 17, 2015, Fernandez announced that he has stepped down from his position at Klout after it was purchased by Lithium in order to pursue other business ventures. Following his decision to step down, Fernandez joined Lithium as one of its board of directors, replacing former board member Chi-Hua Chien (who also joined the board following the acquisition). In 2015, Fernandez became the co-founder and CEO of Joymode, a Los Angeles-based consumer internet startup.

== Impact and reception ==
Fernandez received some criticism due to the perception that a recent change to Klout's score algorithm included a design that punishes users by reducing their Klout scores if they speak to people with "low influence." There was also a public perception that Klout's algorithm was just a "vanity." Following the change in the algorithm (which caused people's Klout scores to lower), a Twitter campaign called "#OccupyKlout" was created, his cell phone was leaked, and he received hundreds of death threats.
