= Adam Segal =

American cybersecurity expert

- Born: September 29, 1968 (age 58)
- Education: Cornell University; Fletcher School of Law and Diplomacy
- Occupation: Cybersecurity expert
- Children: 2

Adam Segal (born September 29, 1968) is an American cybersecurity expert. He serves as the Ira A. Lipman Chair in Emerging Technologies and National Security and Director of the Digital and Cyberspace Policy Program at the Council on Foreign Relations. He is the author of three monographs on technology.

== Early life ==
Adam Segal was born on September 29, 1968, attended Memphis University School, and graduated from Cornell University with a bachelor's degree in government. He received a master's degree from Fletcher School of Law and Diplomacy at Tufts University. He returned to Cornell University, where he received a PhD in government.

== Career ==
Segal is a cybersecurity expert, as well as an expert on Chinese technology policy. He served as the Ira A. Lipman Chair in Emerging Technologies and National Security and Director of the Digital and Cyberspace Policy Program at the Council on Foreign Relations. Before working at the council, he was a China analyst at the Union of Concerned Scientists. He has been a visiting scholar at the Hoover Institution, MIT's Center for International Studies, Shanghai Academy of Social Sciences, and Tsinghua University.

Segal is the author of three books. His first book, Digital Dragon: High-Technology Enterprises in China, was reviewed in Pacific Affairs by Eric Thun, The China Quarterly by Cong Cao, Leonardo by Stefaan Van Ryssen, Perspectives on Politics by Thomas G. Moore, The China Review by Mark Jacobs, The China Journal by Bennis Wai-yip So. Foreign Affairs by Lucian Pye, and Perspectives Chinoises by Gilles Guiheux. His second book, Advantage: How American Innovation Can Overcome the Asian Challenge, was reviewed in the Journal of International Affairs by Christopher Reim and Foreign Affairs by Andrew Nathan. His third book, Hacked World Order was reviewed by Gary Schmitt in The Wall Street Journal and in Lawfare by Henry Farrel.

== Works ==
- Segal, Adam (2003). Digital Dragon: High-Technology Enterprises in China. Ithaca, New York: Cornell University Press. ISBN 9780801459290. OCLC 726824240.
- Segal, Adam (2011). Advantage: How American Innovation Can Overcome the Asian Challenge. New York: W.W. Norton. ISBN 9780393068788. OCLC 601104797.
- Segal, Adam (2016). The Hacked World Order: How Nations Fight, Trade, Maneuver, and Manipulate in the Digital Age. New York: Public Affairs. ISBN 9781610394154. OCLC 925426214.
