= Classical Theatre of Harlem =

Theatre in Harlem, New York City, US

- Formation: 1999
- Type: Theatre group
- Purpose: Classical, Musicals, Plays
- Location: 8 W 126th St New York, NY 10027-3811 USA
- Artistic director(s): Ty Jones & Carl Cofield
- Website: https://www.cthnyc.org

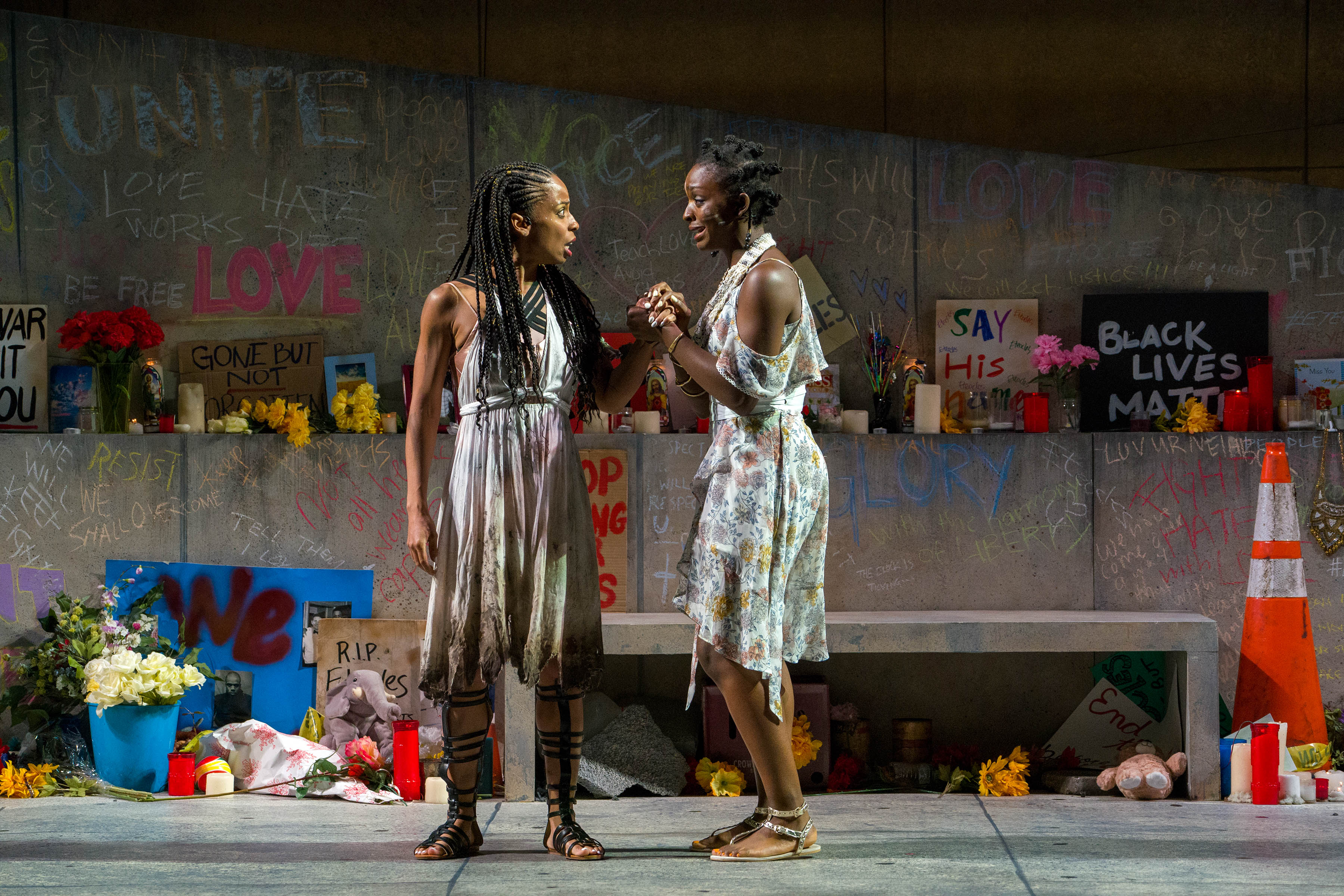
Classical Theatre of Harlems' production of Antigone, July 2018

The Classical Theatre of Harlem (CTH) is an off-Broadway professional theatre company founded in 1999 at the Harlem School of the Arts. Producing on average 2–3 productions a year as well as implementing extensive educational programming, CTH remains the only year-round theatre company operating on an Actors' Equity Association LORT contract in Harlem. Its season selections present a world repertory ranging from Euripides to Derek Walcott, featuring classical and new playwrights. Since its founding, CTH has put on over 40 productions.

The Classical Theatre of Harlem is a 501(c)3 not-for-profit corporation.

== History ==
The Classical Theatre of Harlem was founded in 1999 by theatre directors Alfred Preisser and Christopher McElroen at The Harlem School of the Arts where Alfred served as the director of the Theatre Division until 2007. Both men directed the majority of shows produced at The Classical Theatre of Harlem during their time of leadership with the exception of Funnyhouse of a Negro, directed by Billie Allen, and Ma Rainey's Black Bottom, directed by Arthur French. Preisser served as artistic director and McElroen as executive director for ten years before simultaneously stepping down in early November 2009. Towards the end of their management, the company struggled significantly due to financial mismanagement and neared bankruptcy.

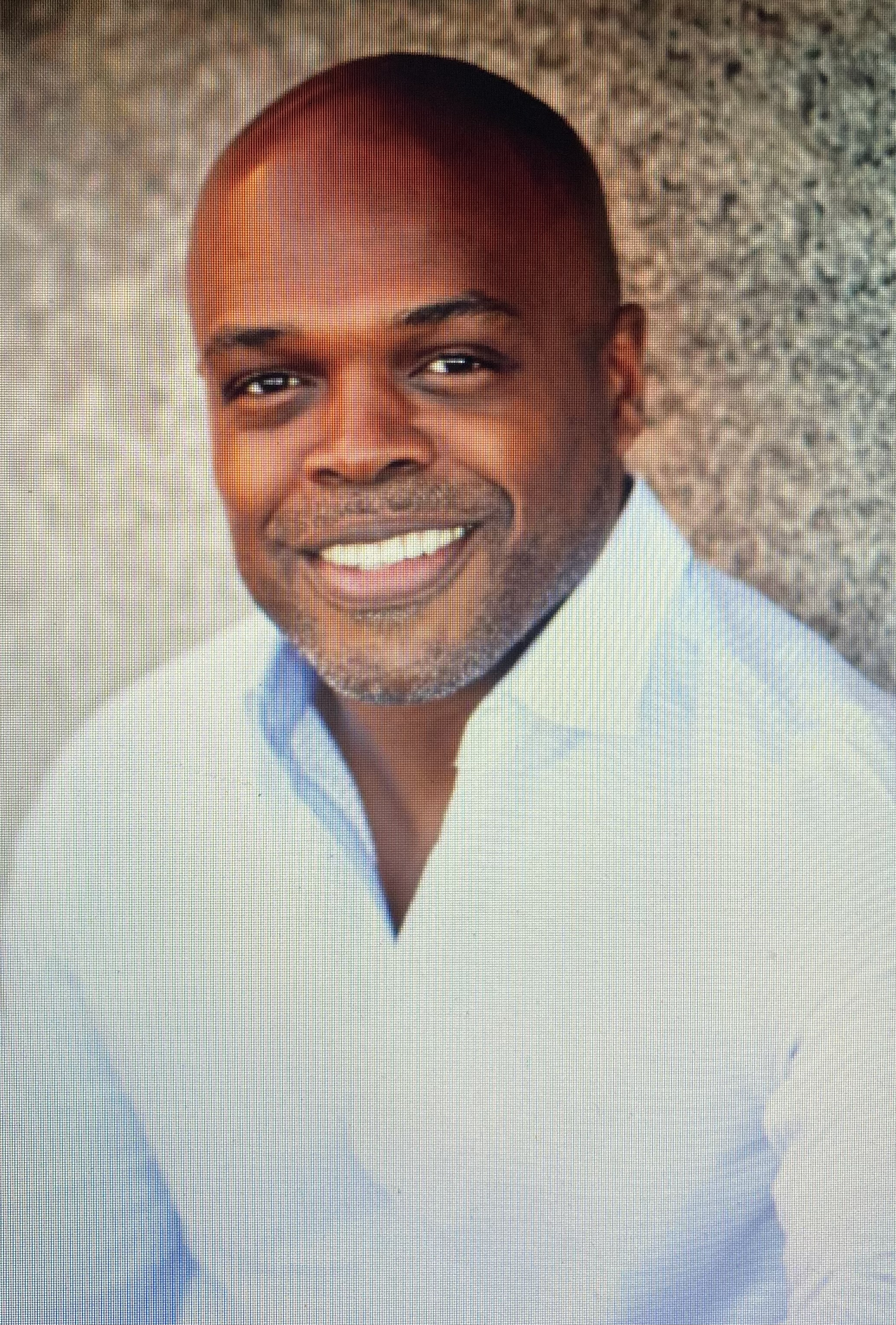
Ty Jones, Artistic Director

Ty Jones worked at The Classical Theatre of Harlem as an actor and artistic collaborator since 2003 before taking over as Producing Artistic Director. In 2009, CTH was nearly closed due to many events: the downturn in the economy, the dramatic cuts in funding for the arts, and the abrupt but necessary departure of the founders. Led by Jones, CTH’s board answered these circumstances, which included retiring $400,000 of debt, with an unprecedented artistic and administrative comeback. Jones maintained the company’s relevance through "Future Classics" - a series of readings of new plays by emerging playwrights of color, as well as readings of classic plays. He also established "Project Classics", an arts education program for youth in Grant and Manhattanville housing in partnership with the New York City Housing Authority (NYCHA). Mr. Jones then found vital funding enabling strategic partnerships to reintroduce full productions. These included the Uptown Meets Downtown™ partnership with downtown theater companies and the inaugural Uptown Shakespeare in the Park (USP) at the Richard Rodgers Amphitheater in Marcus Garvey Park.

Administratively, CTH created a turnaround plan to address organizational growth. This plan was presented to the Upper Manhattan Empowerment Zone (UMEZ) and became the basis for a 30 month $312,000 capacity building grant that allowed CTH to professionalize its operations.

CTH is distinct in that many of their productions and programs are provided for free or minimal cost to patrons. For example, their annual USP production, which attracts roughly 12,000 people each summer, is free, unticketed, family-friendly and ADA compliant. By bringing USP to a vastly underutilized public space, (the Richard Rodgers Amphitheatre) it has been an instrumental force in raising the Park's reputation as a safe, cultural destination to be shared by all: rich and poor, young and old, local Harlemites and visitors. As such, CTH removes barriers to entry (cost, travel, wait-times, lotteries) for guests. In the winter, they feature a family-friendly holiday show, designed to become an annual Harlem tradition. Spring has historically been reserved for newer, experimental productions that appeal to theater enthusiasts, who favor thought-provoking stories and narratives of current social issues. CTH is the only professional theatre company above 96th Street dedicated to the classical canon, revivals, new works and musicals. CTH is well respected among its peers in Black theatre, often cited for its artistic and institutional excellence celebrating the work and talents of diverse theatre-makers at the performance and production level.

In 2018, CTH partnered with Columbia University School of the Arts MFA Theatre Program in an educational program featuring Columbia's MFA third-year actors and stage managers. These students form "The Young Company" whose charge is to provide productions to middle and high school students. In 2021, in the wake of the pandemic, The Classical Theatre of Harlem was the first company to open live outdoor theater in New York City, with the NY Times Critic's Pick production of "Seize the King", directed by Associate Artistic Director of CTH and Chair of the NYU Graduate Acting, Carl Cofield.

== Additional Programming ==
Since 2009, CTH’s core education program "Project Classics" has been designed to provide in-school and after-school subsidized theatre workshops to schools or Community Benefit Organizations (CBO).

"Playwrights' Playground" is a program where 4 to 5 playwrights are selected to bring in 10-15 pages of new work. Each play is cast on the spot, receives a cold reading, and a moderated feedback session.

"Future Classics" are readings of full plays with professional actors and a short rehearsal period. The writers also receives a moderated feedback session. CTH asserts that a future classic is a play of social significance. It enlightens us on issues economic, political, and cultural.

"Revisited Classics" are readings that take a new look at the work of classic playwrights.

== Production history ==
Production	Year	Director	Playwright	Awards
Henry V	2012-13	Jenny Bennett	William Shakespeare	
SEED	2012-13	Niegel Smith	Radha Blank	
A Midsummer Night's Dream	2013-14	Justin Emeka	William Shakespeare	
Detroit 67	2013-14	Kwame Kwei-Armah	Dominique Morriseau	
Romeo N Juliet	2014-15	Justin Emeka	Adapted by: Justin Emeka	
Dutchman	2014-15	Carl Cofield	Amiri Baraka	
The Tempest	2015-16	Carl Cofield	William Shakespeare	
The First Noel	2015-16	Steve H. Broadnax II	Webb/Thompson	
Macbeth	2016-17	Carl Cofield	William Shakespeare	
The First Noel	2016-17	Steve H. Broadnax II	Webb/Thompson	
Fit For A Queen	2016-17	Tamilla Woodard	Betty Shamieh	
The Three Musketeers	2017-18	Jenny Bennett	Catherine Bush	
Sancho: an Act of Remembrance	2017-18	Simon Godwin	Paterson Joseph	
Antigone	2018-19	Carl Cofield	Sophocles	
A Christmas Carol In Harlem	2018-19	Steve H. Broadnax II	Adapted by: Shawn Rene Graham	
The Bacchae	2019-20	Carl Cofield	Bryan Doerries	
A Christmas Carol in Harlem	2019-20	Carl Cofield	Adapted by: Shawn Rene Graham	
Seize the King	2020-21	Carl Cofield	Will Power	
Twelfth Night	2022-23	Carl Cofield	William Shakespeare	Obie Award Winner, Audelco Award Winner
Twelfth Night	2023-24	Carl Cofield	William Shakespeare	
Malvolio	2023-24	Ian Belknap & Ty Jones	Betty Shamieh	

== Awards and nominations ==
The Classical Theatre of Harlem holds 61 AUDELCO nominations and has won 18 awards for excellence in Black theatre.
