= John-Bryan Hopkins =

American food blogger (born 1971)

John-Bryan Standridge Hopkins (born September 9, 1971) is an American food blogger located in Birmingham, Alabama. He is best known for creating the Foodimentary food blog.

== Biography ==
John-Bryan Hopkins began his career as an interior designer working in Birmingham, Alabama.

Hopkins began food blogging in 2005. While discussing his thoughts about addressing and changing the fundamental conversation around food, he created the idea and name of his blog, Foodimentary. Soon afterwards Hopkins began blogging under the Foodimentary name. Later, Hopkins would acknowledge the Foodimentary idea allowed him to look beyond food recipes and cooking stores to explore the history and culture of food.

Hopkins was an early Twitter adopter. He began using the new social media platform in 2007 when the network was only a year old. Due to the complications of early Twitter, Hopkins learned to use simple, shareable language without the need for additional characters or visual assistants to organically grow his audience. He was awarded two Shorty Awards for his role as a food influencer on social media.

Hopkins's food holiday calendar evolved from his role as a food blogger and social influencer. He decided on the new direction from his and his audience's interest in food history. Instead of charging brands or companies for inclusion, Hopkins used a base of already established food holidays. He further filled out the calendar based on interesting and loved foods and drinks.

Hopkins has garnered recognition from a number of media organizations, including the Shorty Awards, Time, Inc., Mashable, and Klout. He is also considered a Southern cuisine expert, and has been featured on Food Network, Cooking Channel, Epicurious, Slate, Los Angeles Times, and New York Times.

Hopkins's book, Foodimentary: Celebrating 365 Food Holidays, was published on September 26, 2017, through an exclusive deal with Books-A-Million. The book was released through other booksellers beginning January 2, 2018.

== Awards ==
In February 2009, Hopkins was awarded the Best in Food category at the first annual Shorty Awards. He was awarded the Best in Food category for a second time at the second annual Shorty Awards in 2010.

In 2013, Hopkins was named one of the 140 Best Twitter Feeds by TIME.

== Bibliography ==
In 2015, Hopkins contributed to the Oxford Companion to Sugar and Sweets published by Oxford University Press.

Hopkins's first book Foodimentary: Celebrating 365 Food Holiday was published in 2017.
