= Allied Universal =

Facility services and security company

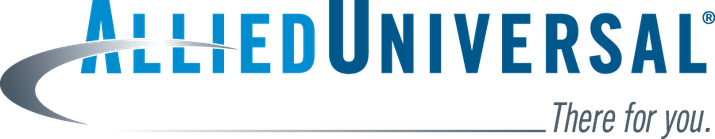
- Type: Private
- Industry: Event Staffing; Janitorial; Security; Security Systems; Surveillance
- Founded: 2016; 10 years ago
- Headquarters: Conshohocken, Pennsylvania, US; (Corporate HQ East); Santa Ana, California, US; (Corporate HQ West)
- Area served: Canada; Honduras; Mexico; Nicaragua; United Kingdom; United States
- Key people: Steve Jones; (Chairman & CEO)
- Revenue: ▲US$18 billion (2021)
- Number of employees: 800,000
- Subsidiaries: G4S STAFF PRO
- Website: aus.com

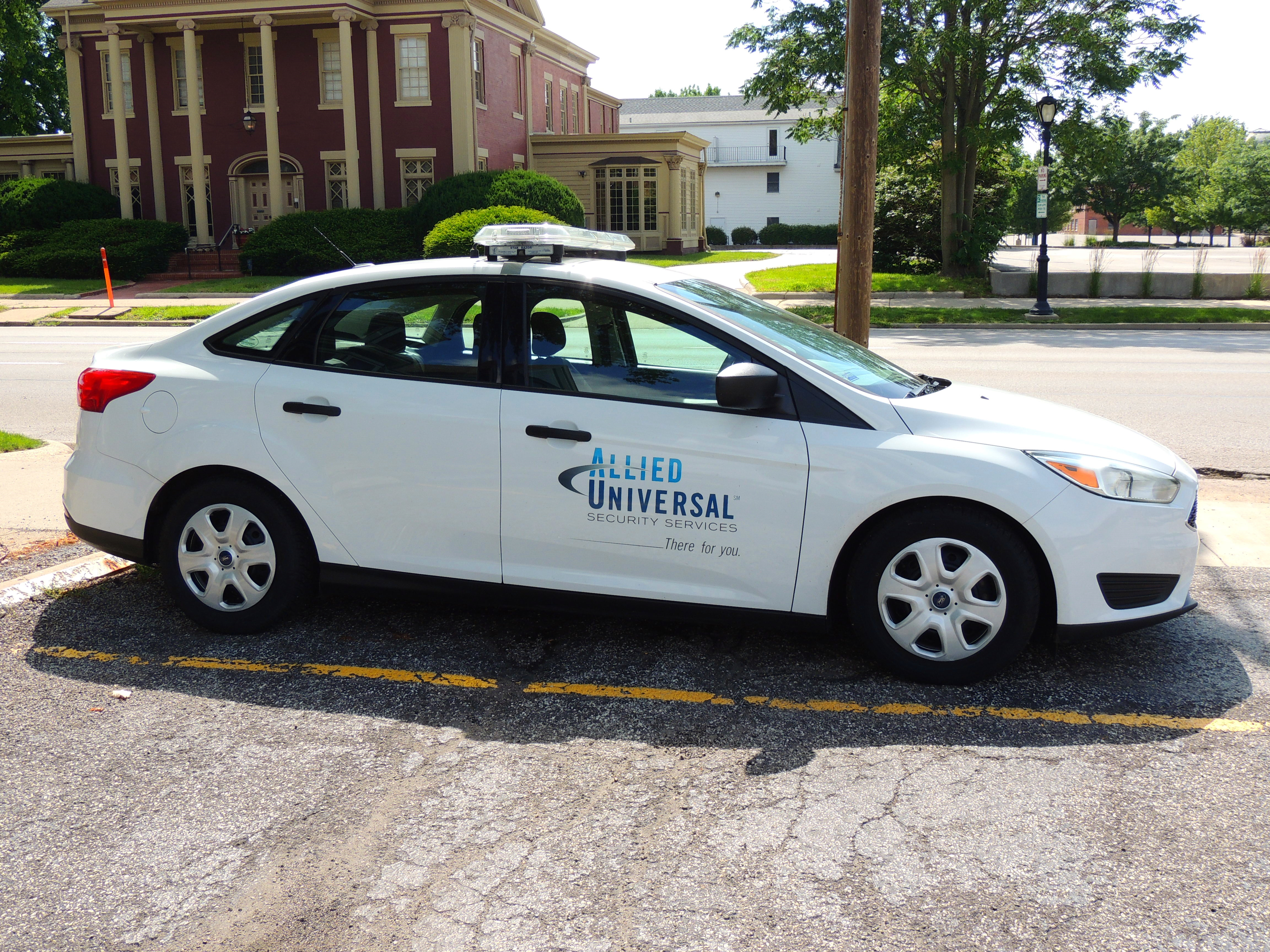
Allied Universal patrol vehicle

Allied Universal is an American private security and staffing company, based in Conshohocken, Pennsylvania, and Irvine, California. Formed in 2016 by the merger of AlliedBarton and Universal Services of America, Allied Universal is the world's largest provider of private security guards. It is also the third largest United States–based employer globally with 800,000 employees.

== History ==
Allied Universal started as two different companies: AlliedBarton and Universal Protection Services.

=== AlliedBarton ===
AlliedBarton was founded as Allied Security in 1957 in Pittsburgh, Pennsylvania as a provider of contracted security guards and related services.

In 2004, Allied Security acquired Malden, Massachusetts-based Security Systems Inc. (SSI) and Atlanta, Georgia-based Barton Protective Services to form AlliedBarton Security Services - creating the largest American-owned contract security services company in the United States.

=== Universal Protection Service ===
Universal Protection Service was founded in 1965. It started as a janitorial company and expanded into security by 1969.

=== After the 2016 merger ===
In 2016, AlliedBarton and Universal Services of America merged to form Allied Universal. In February 2017, the company officially began operations under its new name. After the merger, Allied Universal was considered the largest security company in North America.

In January 2018, the company paid $90,000 to settle a religious discrimination lawsuit from a Muslim employee in California who sought a religious exemption to the company’s grooming standards and was fired. Also in 2018, the radio program This American Life ran an hour-long feature story about sexual harassment and racism within Allied's operations at JFK airport and the company's responses to it. In response to the allegations, the company issued a statement saying these “isolated incidents are not indicative of our culture and work ethic,” and it has “zero tolerance against sexual harassment.” A related case was later voluntarily dismissed at the plaintiffs’ request. In July, Allied Universal announced the purchase of Georgia-based US Security Associates along with its affiliate Staff Pro for $1.5 billion.

In 2019, the company was attacked with a ransomware scheme by the Maze group that turned out to be a stunt designed to warn companies about system security flaws.

In June 2019, the company announced the acquisition of San Francisco-based Cypress Private Security, LP.

In December, majority owner Wendel sold most of its stake in Allied Universal to a Canadian pension fund Caisse de dépôt et placement du Québec (CDPQ), and a new investment group led by investment company Warburg Pincus and an affiliate of the investment company J. Safra Group.

In January 2021, Allied Universal acquired Atlanta-based competitor SecurAmerica.

In December 2020, the Board of Directors and shareholders for British security firm G4S unanimously accepted a takeover offer of 5.1 billion USD from Allied Universal. The acquisition was completed in April 2021, creating a combined company of 800,000 employees, with revenues of more than 18 billion USD.

In June 2023, it was reported that Allied Universal subsidiary G4S would be divesting completely from Israel in response to years of campaigning from the G4S Boycott, Divestment, Sanctions movement for its involvement in Israel and the resulting “reputational damage”. Allied Universal was also said to have divested from Israel.

In October 2026 it was reported that Japanese technology conglomerate SoftBank Group was in discussions to acquire the company at a valuation of $18 billion.

Allied Universal has security contracts, worth billions of dollars, with the Department of Homeland Security.

== Services and operations ==
Allied Universal provides security products and services, including access control, intrusion, alarm detection, and IP-based video systems; janitorial; transition planning; green cleaning; and staffing services. Allied Universal operates in the United States (including Puerto Rico and the U.S. Virgin Islands), the United Kingdom, Canada, Mexico, Honduras, and Nicaragua. As of February 2022, it employed about 800,000 people.
