= Universal Protection Service =

Private security company in the United States

- Type: Private
- Industry: Security
- Founded: 1965
- Founder: Steve Jones; Brian Cescolini
- Defunct: 2017
- Fate: Merged with AlliedBarton
- Successor: Allied Universal
- Headquarters: Santa Ana, California, U.S.

Universal Protection Service was a private security company in the United States. It was part of Santa Ana, California-based Universal Services of America, which merged in 2016 with fellow security service provider AlliedBarton to form Allied Universal.

== History ==
Universal Protection Service was founded in 1965. It started as a janitorial company and expanded into security by 1969. After acquiring the security business, the company was divided into four different divisions, under parent Universal Services, to reflect the company's overall business.

In 2013, the Swiss investment firm Partners Group made an equity investment in the company.

In November 2013, the company acquired Bannockburn, Illinois-based venue security company IPC International, at the time the company's largest acquisition.

By 2015, the company was operating as a division of Universal Services of America. In February, Robert Stone, a former employee of Universal Protection Service filed an arbitration claim alleging that the company failed to pay overtime wages for all hours worked as well as minimum wage. Stone also asserted claims of additional wage violations including meal period and rest period violations, allegedly in violation of California and federal wage law. The company denied the allegations, but entered into a $30 million settlement to avoid the cost of litigation. The settlement was granted preliminary approval on November 22, 2017. In July 2015, Universal Services of America received an ownership investment from investment firm Warburg Pincus, joining earlier owner investment firm Partners Group. Also in July, parent Universal Services acquired Memphis, Tennessee-based security firm Guardsmark, and became the largest privately owned security contractor in the US. Guardsmark's founder, Ira A. Lipman, joined UPS's board as vice chairman.

In 2016, Universal Services of America merged with fellow security services firm AlliedBarton to form Allied Universal. In February 2017, the company officially began operations under its new name.

== Operations ==
Universal Protection Service offered security services and was located in Santa Ana, California. It was a division of Universal Services of America, with three other divisions: Universal Building Maintenance (janitorial and maintenance), Universal Protection Security Systems (security system installation and management), and Universal Fire/Life Safety (fire safety planning and training). Universal Services of America was owned by investment firms is owned Warburg Pincus and Partners Group.
