= Mary S. Cummins =

American educator (1854–1894)

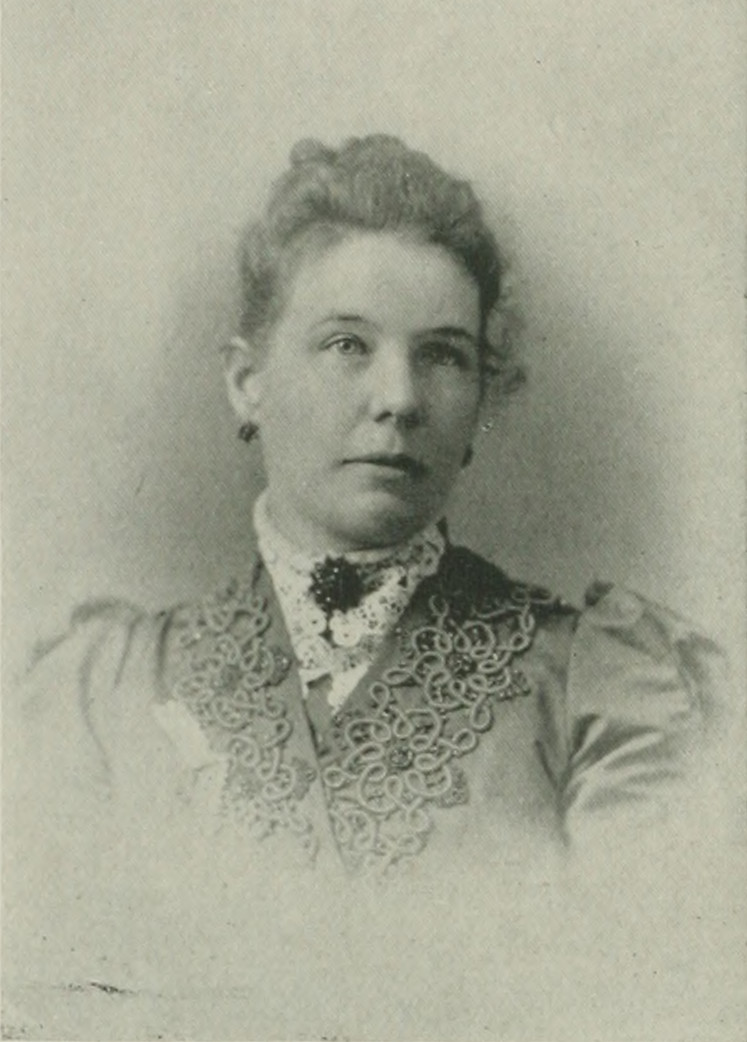
- Portrait photo from A Woman of the Century
- Born: Mary Stuart Slemons; May 31, 1854; Jonesborough, Tennessee, U.S.
- Died: October 1, 1894 (aged 40); Los Angeles, California, U.S.
- Burial place: Mount Olivet Cemetery
- Education: Augusta Female Seminary
- Occupation: Educator
- Known for: Preceptor, Montana Wesleyan University; Lady principal, Occidental College; President, Montana State Woman's Christian Temperance Union
- Spouse: W. F. Cummins (m. 1877)

Mary S. Cummins (née, Slemons; 1854–1894) was a 19th-century American educator who was also the leader of various religious, social reform, and teachers' organizations. She served as president of the Synodical Missionary Society, the Montana State Teachers' Association, and the Montana State Woman's Christian Temperance Union (WCTU).

== Early life and education ==
Mary Stuart Slemons was born in Jonesborough, Tennessee, May 31, 1854. She was of Pennsylvania Dutch origin, but her ancestors, both maternal and paternal, were for a long time residents of the South. Her father, William C. Slemons (d. 1887), a native of Tennessee, married Miss Maria Dosser, also of that State. They reared a family of seven children, Cummins being the fourth born. The father was by trade a tanner and was engaged in that business all his life. He was an Elder in the Presbyterian Church.

Cummins was reared and educated in her native town, graduating at the age of sixteen. Seeking to continue her studies beyond the standard academic course, she pursued further education through her own efforts and obtained a full diploma from the Augusta Female Seminary (now, Mary Baldwin University), Staunton, Virginia.

== Career ==
Returning to Tennessee in 1874, she began teaching, and for nine years, was principal and teacher of the Knoxville High School, remaining in Knoxville until 1886. Finding time to enter other fields, a very large mission Sunday school became a part of her work. She also served as president of the Synodical Missionary Society and a State member of the executive board of Home Missions of New York for the Presbyterian Church. An effort was made to place her in charge of school interests in Mexico, but that did not seem to be compatible with her other duties.

In 1886, partly for a change of climate and partly to pursue new business opportunities, she came with her husband to Montana Territory. They settled in Helena, where Mr. Cummins engaged in the real estate business, both on his own account and for others, and also held interests in various mining enterprises.

Soon after their coming to Helena, Mary Cummins accepted the position as principal of Helena High School, in which she served for five years, and which she resigned in order to accept a position as preceptor in the Montana Wesleyan University in September 1891. There, she was in change of the young ladies' department and professor of Latin and modern languages. Cummins, together with Prof. Joseph C. Templeton, also a professor in Montana Wesleyan, handled the inside management of university affairs.

During her residence in Montana, she attained a high standing among the educators of the State, and was chosen by them successively as vice president and president of the Montana State Teachers' Association. She also served as a member of the state board of charities and reforms for Montana, being confirmed in 1895.

In temperance work, she took a leading part, including serving as president of the Montana State WCTU. In 1891, she was commissioned by Frances Willard as national organizer for the vacation months, to work in Montana, and she traveled over a large part of the State, organizing new unions. Partly as a result of that tour, the banner presented by Willard for the largest percentage of gain in membership in the Western States was given to Montana in 1891.

On June 22, 1897, Cummins filed an application for a patent, under the mining laws of Congress, for 1,467.4 feet (447.3 m) of the Lizzie lode and 835.4 feet (254.6 m) of the Brandon lode, designated as Surveys No. 4858 and 4859, situated in (unorganized) mining district, Jefferson County, Montana.

In her later life, Cummins served as lady principal of Occidental College, at Los Angeles, California.

== Personal life ==
In 1877, she married W. F. Cummins, a merchant of Knoxville.

Mary Stuart Slemons Cummins died in Los Angeles, October 1, 1894. She was interred at Mount Olivet Cemetery.
