= Klout =

2008–2018 American website and mobile app

- Company type: Subsidiary
- Website type: Social Networking
- Available in: English
- Headquarters: San Francisco, California, United States
- Area served: Worldwide
- Owner: Lithium Technologies
- Founders: Joe Fernandez; Binh Tran
- Key people: Joe Fernandez (CEO); Emil Michael (COO)
- Advertising: No
- Registration: Optional
- Launched: 2008
- Current status: Closed

Klout was a website and mobile app that used social media analytics to rate its users according to online social influence via the "Klout Score", which was a numerical value between 1 and 100. In determining the user score, Klout measured the size of a user's social media network and correlated the content created to measure how other users interact with that content. Klout launched in 2008.

Lithium Technologies, who acquired the site in March 2014, closed the service on May 25, 2018, the same day the European General Data Protection Regulation came into force.

Klout used Bing, Facebook, Foursquare, Google+, Instagram, LinkedIn (individuals' pages, not corporate/business), Twitter (now X), Wikipedia, and YouTube data to create Klout user profiles that were assigned a "Klout Score". Klout scores ranged from 1 to 100, with higher scores corresponding to a higher ranking of the breadth and strength of one's online social influence. While all Twitter users were assigned a score, users who registered at Klout could link multiple social networks, of which network data was then aggregated to influence the user's Klout Score.

== Methodology ==
Klout measured influence by using data points from Twitter, such as the following count, follower count, retweets, list memberships, how many spam/dead accounts were following you, how influential the people who retweet you were and unique mentions. This information was combined with data from a number of other social network followings and interactions to come up with the Klout Score. Other accounts such as Flickr, Blogger, Tumblr, Last.fm, and WordPress could also be linked by users, but they did not weigh into the Klout Score. Microsoft announced a strategic investment in Klout in September 2012 whereby Bing would have access to Klout influence technology, and Klout would have access to Bing search data for its scoring algorithm.

Klout scores were supplemented with three nominally more specific measures, which Klout calls "true reach", "amplification" and "network impact". True reach is based on the size of a user's engaged audience who actively engage in the user's messages. Amplification score relates to the likelihood that one's messages will generate actions, such as retweets, mentions, likes and comments. Network impact reflects the computed influence value of a person's engaged audience.

Several objections to Klout's methodology were raised regarding both the process by which scores were generated, and the overall societal effect. Critics pointed out that Klout scores were not representative of the influence a person really has, highlighted by Barack Obama, then President of the United States, having a lower influence score than a number of bloggers. Other social critics argued that the Klout score devalued authentic online communication and promoted social ranking and stratification by trying to quantify human interaction. Klout attempted to address some of these criticisms, and updated their algorithms so that Barack Obama's importance was better reflected. Klout was similarly criticised for the opacity of their methodology. While it was claimed that advanced machine learning techniques were used, leveraging network theory, Sean Golliher analysed Klout scores of Twitter users and found that the simple logarithm of the number of followers was sufficient to explain 95% of the variance.

== History ==
In 2007, Joe Fernandez underwent a surgery that required him to wire his mouth shut. Because he could not speak for three months, he turned to Facebook and Twitter for social interaction. During this period, he became obsessed with the idea that "word of mouth was measurable." Pulling data from Twitter’s API, he created a prototype that would assign users a score out of 100 to measure their influence. Midway into 2008, he showed the prototype to some friends, who told him it was "the dumbest thing ever."

In 2008, the first version of Klout went online.

In September 2011, Klout integrated with Google+. In October, Klout changed its scoring algorithm, lowering many scores and creating complaints. In November, Klout partnered with Wahooly for their beta launch.

In January 2012, Klout was able to raise an estimated $30 million from a host of venture capital firms. In February, Klout acquired local and mobile neighborhood app Blockboard.

On March 28, 2013, Klout announced that it would begin including Instagram analytics in its algorithm.

On March 27, 2014, Klout was acquired by Lithium Technologies for $200 million.

In May 2018, Klout announced that it would cease operations on May 25, 2018. The closure had been planned for some time and was accelerated by the entry into force of the General Data Protection Regulation.

== Business model ==
=== Perks ===
The primary business model for Klout involved companies paying Klout for Perks campaigns, in which a company offers free services or products to Klout users who match a pre-defined set of criteria including their scores, topics, and geographic locations. While Klout users who had received Perks were under no obligation to write about them, the hope was that they will effectively advertise the products on social media. Klout offered the Perks program beginning in 2010. According to Klout CEO Joe Fernandez, about 50 partnerships had been established as of November 2011. In May 2013, Klout announced that its users had claimed more than 1 million Perks across over 400 campaigns.

=== Klout for business ===
In March 2013, Klout announced its intention to begin displaying business analytics aimed at helping business and brand users learn about their online audiences.

=== Content page ===
In September 2012, Klout announced an information-sharing partnership with the Bing search engine, showing Klout scores in Bing searches and allowing Klout users to post items selected by Bing to social media.

== See also ==
- Q Score, a rating system for brand/celebrity popularity
- BitClout, a social network based on popularity with monetary value (cryptocurrency) assigned to each user
- PeerIndex, a company that provided social media analytics similarly to Klout
- Engagio, another such platform that provided a wide array of other similar tools
- SocialIQ, which is an influence platform that measures users' online influence and rewards people for driving word of mouth
