= Ira A. Lipman =

American businessman and philanthropist (1940–2019)

- Born: November 15, 1940; Little Rock, Arkansas, U.S.
- Died: September 16, 2019 (aged 78); New York City, U.S.
- Education: Little Rock Central High School
- Occupations: Businessman, philanthropist
- Spouse: Barbara K. Lipman
- Children: 3 sons

Ira Ackerman Lipman (November 15, 1940 – September 16, 2019) was an American businessman and philanthropist. He was the founder and chairman of Guardsmark, a privately owned security company with a payroll of 17,000 employees and 130 offices in the United States, Puerto Rico, the United Kingdom and France. In 2015, he sold Guardsmark to Universal Protection Service, the largest private security company in the United States, and he served as its vice chairman until its 2016 merger with AlliedBarton. He was called "a pioneer in the private security guard business". His work was cited by the United States Department of Justice's Law Enforcement Assistance Administration and the United States House Judiciary Subcommittee on Crime, Terrorism, Homeland Security and Investigations. He supported the arts in Memphis, Tennessee, and Judeo-Christian interfaith dialogue in the United States.

== Early life ==
Ira A. Lipman was born November 15, 1940 to a Jewish family in Little Rock, Arkansas. His father, Mark Lipman, was the founder of Mark Lipman Service, a private investigation company, and the author of the 1975 book Stealing: How America's Employees Are Stealing Their Companies Blind. His mother was Belle Ackerman. He was a member of Aleph Zadik Aleph.

Lipman was educated at the Little Rock Central High School in Little Rock, Arkansas. While he was in high school, Lipman acted as an anonymous source to journalist John Chancellor, who was covering desegregation.

== Business career ==
Lipman founded Guardsmark, a security company, in 1963. He initially founded the company to provide hospitals and factories with a better security services organization. Within a year, in 1964, he had under 100 employees. He served as its president and chairman from 1970 to 2015.

In 1971, Lipman disagreed with City College of New York Professor Lawrence Zeitlin's research, which showed companies would save money by letting good employees steal. Instead, he argued that companies should cut costs by investing in good security to prevent theft. Lipman believed most theft occurred as a result to addiction to narcotics, and the best way for companies to end this would be to hire undercover security agents, as employees would be more likely to confess to them than policemen. By 1973, Lipman expanded his business to shoplifting prevention, especially in the Southeastern United States.

Meanwhile, in 1972, after President Richard Nixon laid off 1,100 federal airport security agents, Lipman argued that they should be replaced with private armed guards who should be present in airports at all times. Moreover, Lipman suggested that airport security could be improved if frequent travelers carried with them special cards, as airport security would then focus on irregular travelers and significantly reduce the risks of skyjacking. He added that passengers should be required to go through metal detectors, their carry-on luggage should be searched, and landing ramps should be equipped with closed-circuit television camera. By 1976, Lipman's company handled security for 20 airports in the United States.

Lipman expanded his business to home security in 1973, initially in Memphis, Houston, New Haven, Connecticut, and Concord, California. Meanwhile, he also expanded his business to patrolling entire neighborhoods, the first of which was Belle Meade, Tennessee. By then, he had 3,500 employees active in 35 cities across the United States. A decade later, in 1983, Lipman argued that neighborhood security guards needed "walkies-talkies, close-circuit cameras, electronic fences, bullet-proof glass, card-key systems", but no guns, adding "They are more of a threat to society by having a gun.".

Lipman expanded his business further with bodyguard protection for high-net-worth individuals by 1974. He argued that this was necessary to prevent kidnappings.

Lipman authored a book about security entitled How To Protect Yourself From Crime: Everything You Need To Know To Guard Yourself, Your Family, Your Home, Your Possessions, And Your Business in 1975.

A 1981 report from the United States Department of Justice's Law Enforcement Assistance Administration quoted Lipman's advice that having a dog in the house was an efficient deterrent for burglaries. Meanwhile, in a 1988 lecture at the Institute of Criminal Justice and Criminology of the University of Maryland, College Park, Lipman suggested private security firms should have access to the Federal Bureau of Investigation's criminal records to weed out felons and individuals with mental health problems.

Lipman's business increased in the wake of the 1995 Oklahoma city bombing. On September 11, 2001, Lipman instructed his employees to evacuate floors 48th to 52nd of the One Liberty Plaza, adjacent to the World Trade Center. Within a year, Lipman supported the Private Security Officer Employment Standards Act, a 2002 bill proposed by Senator Carl Levin of Michigan. Don Walker, the chairman and CEO of Pinkerton and chair of the American Society for Industrial Security, suggested Lipman had worked with Levin in "a cloud of secrecy". In 2004, Lipman's opinion pieces published in The New York Times as early as 1980 were discussed by the United States House Judiciary Subcommittee on Crime, Terrorism, Homeland Security and Investigations.

By 2014, the company had an annual revenue of US$500 million, with 17,000 employees. It had "130 offices in the United States, Canada, Puerto Rico and the United Kingdom."

In 2015, Lipman sold Guardsmark to Universal Protection Service, making it the largest security company in the United States. Lipman served as its vice chairman until its merger with AlliedBarton in 2016.

Lipman was the chairman emeritus of the National Council on Crime and Delinquency. He also served on the board of the International Association of Chiefs of Police. He was a member of the Council on Foreign Relations, where he was the namesake of the chair in Emerging Technologies and National Security, currently held by Adam Segal. He is the recipient of the Stanley C. Pace Leadership in Ethics Award from the Ethics Research Center.

Lipman was called "a pioneer in the private security guard business" by The New York Times. He was also called a "pioneer" by Don Walker, the chairman and CEO of Pinkerton.

Lipman was a shareholder of Contemporary Media, Inc., which owns Memphis: The City Magazine.

== Philanthropy and art collection ==
Lipman served on the boards of trustees of the Brooks Memorial Art Gallery and the Memphis Academy of Arts as well as on the Advisory Council of the Chickasaw Council Boy Scouts of America. He established the Alexis de Tocqueville Chapter of the United Way of Memphis in 1984, and he led its fundraising campaigns in 1985–1986. In 1992, he was elected to the board of governors of the United Way of America. In 1995, he endowed the annual $50,000 John Chancellor Award. He served on the board of trustees of Ohio Wesleyan University, from 1988 to 1997.

Lipman was appointed as the vice president of the National Conference of Christians and Jews in 1992. He subsequently served as its chairman. He was appointed as the vice president of the International Council of Christians and Jews in 1992. He served as the Honorary Life Chairman of the National Conference for Community and Justice. He served as an officer of the American Jewish Historical Society in 1994–1995. With his wife, he donated a Torah scroll to Yeshiva University in 2007. He served on the board of trustees of the Simon Wiesenthal Center.

Lipman collected paintings by Henri de Toulouse-Lautrec, Pablo Picasso, Henri Matisse and Mary Cassatt.

== Personal life ==
Lipman's wife, Barbara, established the Barbara K. Lipman Early Childhood School Research Institute at the University of Memphis. They had three sons, Gus, who served as Senior Vice President of Guardsmark, Joshua, and M Benjamin. Lipman died of complications from lymphoma on September 16, 2019, at the age of 78.

== Works ==
- Lipman, Ira A. (1975). How To Protect Yourself From Crime: Everything You Need To Know To Guard Yourself, Your Family, Your Home, Your Possessions, And Your Business. New York: Atheneum. ISBN 9780689106866. OCLC 1974414.
- Lipman, Ira A., ed. (1988). The Private Security Industry: Issues and Trends. Newbury Park, California: Sage. ISBN 9780803931039. OCLC 18377586.
- Lipman, Ira A. (2011). How To Be Safe: Protect Yourself, Your Home, Your Family, and Your Business from Crime. Pleasantville, New York: Reader's Digest Association. ISBN 9781606521694. OCLC 548596956.
- Lipman, Ira A., Special Editor. Lambert, Richard D. (ed.). "The Private Security Industry: Issues and Trends". The Annals of the American Academy of Political and Social Science. 498 (July 1988). Sage Publications.
