= Edward D. Miller =

Edward D. Miller Jr.
- Born: 1943 (age 82–83); Rochester, New York
- Education: Ohio Wesleyan University
- Occupations: Medical executive, anesthesiologist
- Years active: 1970s-

Edward D. Miller Jr. (born 1943) is an American medical executive. He was the Frances Watt Baker, M.D. and Lenox D. Baker Jr., M.D. Dean of the Medical Faculty at Johns Hopkins University and the chief executive officer of Johns Hopkins Medicine from 1997 to 2012.

He is an anesthesiologist who has published over 150 scientific papers and other works on cardiovascular effects of anesthetic drugs and vascular smooth muscle relaxation.

== Early life and education ==
Miller was born in 1943 in Rochester, New York. He received an A.B. from Ohio Wesleyan University and an M.D. from the University of Rochester Medical Center School of Medicine and Dentistry.

== Career ==
He was then an intern at University Hospital in Boston, chief resident in anesthesiology at Peter Bent Brigham Hospital in Boston, and research fellow in physiology at Harvard Medical School. In the 1970s and 1980s, he was a member of the medical faculty at the University of Virginia. He was then professor and chairman of the Department of Anesthesiology at the College of Physicians and Surgeons of Columbia University.

He became professor and director of the Department of Anesthesiology and Critical Care Medicine at Johns Hopkins in 1994, and was appointed interim dean in 1996. Shortly after he was appointed, the school and Johns Hopkins Health System merged, with Miller becoming the first CEO and medical school dean under the restructuring.

He became dean and CEO of Johns Hopkins Medicine in 1997. He was succeeded in 2012 by Dr. Paul B. Rothman.

In 2012, he was named to a four-year term at the University of Virginia.

He quit the governing board of the University of Virginia a year early in 2015, the Board of Visitors, with the Washington Post noting he had criticized a decline in research funding and a tuition increase.

== Honors ==
- President of the Association of University Anesthesiologists
- Editor of Anesthesia and Analgesia
- Editor of Critical Care Medicine
- Board of the International Anesthesia Research Society
- Chairman of the FDA's Advisory Committee on Anesthesia and Life Support Drugs
- Member of the Institute of Medicine of the National Academy of Sciences
- Fellow of the Royal College of Physicians
- Fellow of the Royal College of Anaesthetists
- Distinguished Eagle Scout
- Ohio Wesleyan University Distinguished Achievement Citation

== See also ==
- List of Ohio Wesleyan University people
- List of Pace University people
- List of Tau Kappa Epsilon members
- List of University of Rochester people
- List of members of the National Academy of Medicine
