= Draper Fisher Jurvetson =

American venture capital firm

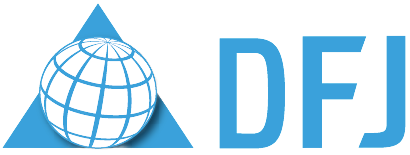

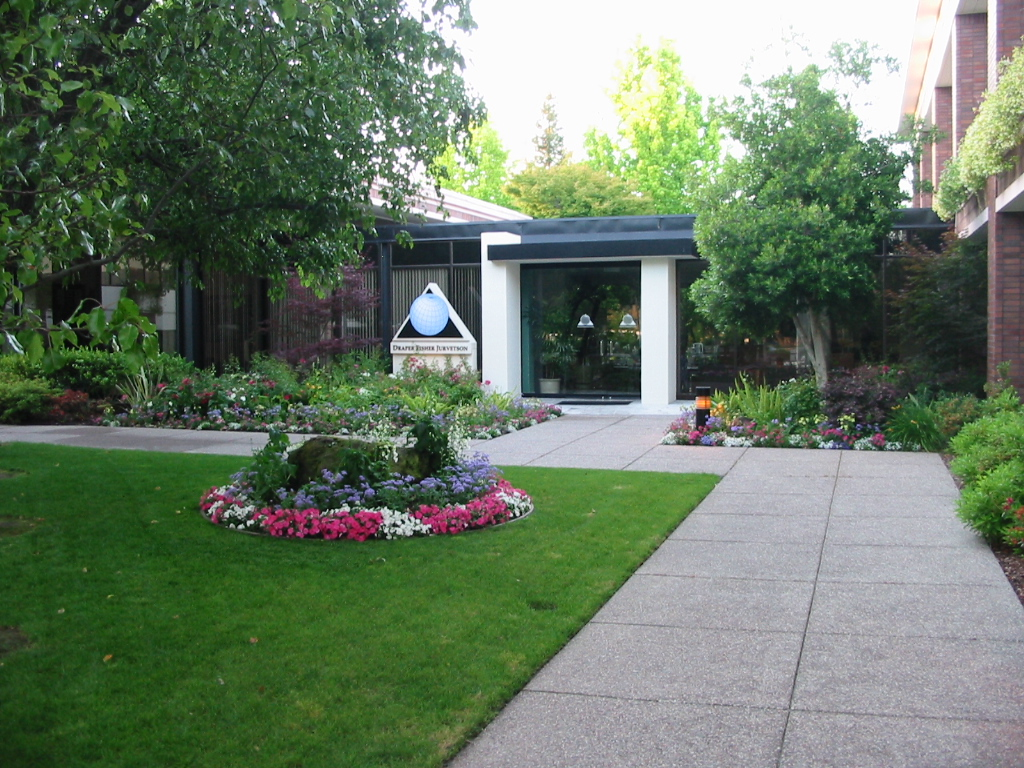
- Silicon Valley office
- Type: Private ownership
- Industry: Venture capital
- Founded: 1985
- Founder: Tim Draper
- Headquarters: Menlo Park, California, United States
- Products: Investments
- Total assets: $5 billion
- Website: www.dfj.com

Draper Fisher Jurvetson (DFJ Growth) is an American venture capital firm. Founded in 1985 by Tim Draper, DFJ Growth is headquartered in Menlo Park, California.

== History ==
Tim Draper founded Draper Associates in 1985. John Fisher became a partner in 1991 and Steve Jurvetson joined in 1994, and the firm became Draper, Fisher, Jurvetson. In 2013, Draper announced his departure from DFJ. Draper announced he will continue investing out of an early stage venture fund Draper Associates V and assisting his son in running an incubator.

The DFJ Network was renamed the Draper Venture Network in 2015 and was operated by Draper.

In November 2017, Jurvetson stepped down from his position at DFJ after allegations of sexual harassment.

In January 2019, DFJ Venture, the early-stage team, spun out and formed Threshold Ventures.

DFJ Growth’s fourth fund of nearly $1 billion closed in 2021.

In May 2025, DFJ Growth raised $1.2 billion for its fifth fund.

DFJ Growth's investments have included Anaplan, Coinbase, Cylance, Ring, Sisense, SpaceX, Tesla, Twitter, Unity, and Yammer.
