= SocialIQ =

Social IQ
- Formerly: Soovox Inc.
- Type: Private
- Industry: Influencer marketing, Social media
- Founded: 2009
- Founder: Akram Benmbarek
- Fate: Defunct
- Headquarters: San Diego, California, United States

Social IQ (formerly Soovox Inc.) was a San Diego-based influencer marketing platform that measured users' online social influence and connected them with brands for word-of-mouth marketing campaigns. The company was founded in 2009 by Akram Benmbarek and was headquartered in San Diego, California.

== History ==
Akram Benmbarek, who had previously worked in technology finance at Advanced Equities Financial Corp and in wealth management at Morgan Stanley, Merrill Lynch, and UBS, founded the company in mid-2009 under the name Soovox.

In October 2011, Benmbarek rebranded the company as SocialIQ. At that time, the company was seeking a Series A round of venture capital, having raised under $1 million in angel seed funding.

== Similar metrics ==
- Klout
- PeerIndex
