= Valentine Rossilli Winsey =

American teacher, historian, anthropologist, sociologist, psychologist and activist

Valentine Rossilli Winsey, born Valentina Diane Rossilli (1923-2007) was an American speech and drama teacher, historian of immigration, anthropologist, sociologist, psychologist and women's rights activist. After completing a thesis on Italian American migration to New York City, she became a student of Buckminster Fuller, developing his idea of a 'World Game'. She taught anthropology at Pace College. Refused tenure at Pace, she brought a lawsuit against the university for sex discrimination. She later published a genealogical guide, and research on a variety of sociological and psychological topics, including touch and relations with pets.

== Life ==
Valentina Diane Rossilli was born on May 20, 1923, in New York City. The daughter of Anthony Rossili, she grew up in Newark, New Jersey. She graduated BA from Montclair State Teachers College in 1943 and MA from the University of Denver in 1945.

By 1946 she had taken 'Valentine' as her first name, and established the Rossilli Studio of Corrective Speech and Drama. She continued membership of the Speech Association of America through 1947. In 1948 she wrote a radio drama, Good morning to you, for kindergarten children in Newark, and worked with WBGO Radio. She was employed at Seton Hall University in the 1950s, where she was an assistant professor of speech, and disputed her salary there in 1952-3. She married Aubrey Winsey, a copywriter who went on to work at the public relations department of John Jay College of Criminal Justice.

Winsey gained her PhD from New York University in 1966. Her thesis examined the changing attitudes of Southern Italian immigrant communities in New York City in the decades around 1900, drawing on the 'race relations cycle' theory of Robert E. Park. That year she joined the anthropology department at Pace College (later Pace University).

In 1969 she studied with Buckminster Fuller, and in 1970-71 created the first undergraduate course on Fuller's World Game.

Winsey and her husband were friends of the journalist Flora Rheta Schreiber, and gave Schreiber skeptical advice when she was writing what became her 1973 bestselling book Sybil.

In 1973 she researched the motivations of Jewish police in the New York City Police Department. From interviews with police officers, she found that most had ended up in the job through economic security, from the Great Depression onwards. The number of Jewish police had recently declined, with respondents citing lack of status and low salary. In the 1970s she also wrote a nationally syndicated advice column, 'Dear Val'.

Winsey, refused tenure at Pace, hired Judith Vladeck to mount a legal challenge to the decision. Though a lower court found against her, in 1975 the case came before the New York State Court of Appeals. The university argued that Winsey was a troublemaker who spent too much time challenging the university system. In response, Vladeck challenged the university's patriarchal assumptions: "The only way women are tolerated is if they are supine, silent and submissive.” The appeal court ruling agreed. "Those who fight for rights are often perceived as troublesome, but the law does not require people to be supine." Winsey won reinstatement with back pay, and received her tenure. Winsey was belatedly created a professor of anthropology at Pace in 1998.

Retiring from Pace in 2000, Winsey moved away from New York to live in Sarasota. She died on February 17, 2007. Papers relating to her are held by Harvard University's Schlesinger Library. The R. Buckminster Fuller Papers at Stanford University also contain some correspondence with her, and material relating to Winsey's World Games activity.

== Works ==
- "World Game Has Serious Ends'". Pace Press: 10. 11 March 1970.
- New York World Game No. 2: Report. 1972.
- "My Son, the Policeman". Jewish Life: 42. 1972.
- Dyckman W Vermilye, ed. (1973). "World Game: An Education in Education". The Future in the Making. San Francisco: Jossey-Bass. pp. 104–.
- Francesco Cordasco, ed. (1975). "The Italian American Women Who Arrived in the United States Before World War I". Studies in Italian American Social History: Essays in Honour of Leonard Covello. Towota, N.J.: Rowman & Littlefield.
- Your Self As History: Family History and its effects on your Personality: a research guide. New York: Pace University Press. 1992.
