= Carl Cofield =

American theatre director

Carl Cofield is an American theatre director and actor.

== Education and influences ==
Cofield was in the first class of the New World School of the Arts in Miami. He studied for one summer at Royal Academy of Dramatic Art and earned a BFA in Acting from University of Miami. He earned an MFA in Directing from Columbia University in 2014.

Cofield is heavily influenced by music and hip-hop culture, citing the poetry and rhythm of Public Enemy as a key influence.

== Television and film ==
Cofield was a child actor in commercials, television series, and films. He was in almost a dozen Burger King commercials starting at age four and in several Wise Cheez Doodles commercials. He was on Miami Vice in 1986 and 1988, and Law & Order in 1993 and 1994, in both cases playing different characters on different episodes. He had roles on Tyler Perry's House of Payne, Mama, I Want to Sing!, and several other films and television series.

== Theatre ==
=== Acting ===
Cofield performed in several shows and toured with the Acting Company including as Henry in Henry V, and performed in multiple productions at Alabama Shakespeare Festival including Orsino in Twelfth Night and Orlando in As You Like It, Shakespeare Santa Cruz as Laertes in Hamlet and Victor in Private Lives, and Arena Stage including Lymon in The Piano Lesson and Acaste in The Misanthrope.

Cofield also played Morocco in The Merchant of Venice at Shakespeare Theatre Company, Boy Willie in The Piano Lesson at Indiana Repertory Theatre, and Barlow in Gem of the Ocean at Actors Theatre of Louisville.

He performed off-Broadway at the Manhattan Theatre Club in Ruined and The Whipping Man, and at shows at Duke on 42nd and Lucille Lortel Theater.

=== Directing ===
Cofield directed The Mountaintop at Cleveland Playhouse in 2016, Disgraced at Denver Center, A Raisin in the Sun at Two River Theatre, and Henry IV, Part 2 at Oregon Shakespeare Festival in 2017.

He directed the world premiere of One Night in Miami at Rogue Machine in Los Angeles in 2013. He directed the play again at Denver Center in 2015 and at Miami New Drama in 2018.

He directed Radio Golf by August Wilson at Everyman Theatre, Baltimore in 2019, and Cymbeline at The Public Theater for their Mobile Unit and A Raisin in the Sun at Yale Repertory Theatre in 2020.

His 2019 Twelfth Night at Yale Rep was staged with an Afrofuturistic aesthetic. In 2021, he directed King Lear at St. Louis Shakespeare Festival with André De Shields in the lead role and set in Africa.

=== Classical Theatre of Harlem ===
In 2018, Cofield was appointed Associate Artistic Director of Classical Theatre of Harlem. In 2014, Cofield directed the 50th anniversary production of Amiri Baraka's Dutchman, as a joint venture with National Black Theatre and Classical Theatre of Harlem. His 2015 production of The Tempest was set in Hispaniola. Cofield directed a production of Macbeth in 2016, Antigone in 2018, and for his 2019 production of The Bacchae Cofield was described as taking advantage "of the outdoor setting with an electrifying staging that constantly breaks the fourth wall, bringing us mortals closer to the deities onstage."

In 2021, Cofield directed Will Power's Seize the King, a re-writing of Richard III, that was described as "both monumental and minimalist." Cofield's 2022 production of Twelfth Night was hailed by The New York Times as one of the best productions that year and for its direction.

== Service to the arts ==
Cofield has been involved in the development of numerous theatrical projects. In 2014, he was a director for the play festival, 48 Hours in Harlem, through the National Black Theatre. In 2017, he directed a series of six plays commissioned by the McCarter Theatre at Princeton, for the program, the "Princeton and Slavery Plays." In 2019, he directed The Kept Private, a documentary theatre play, at Jeremy Davidson Storyhorse Theatre.

== Teaching ==
Cofield has taught at Theatre for a New Audience, Fredonia, York College, and Baruch College. Beginning in 2015, he began to teach at The New School, and in 2019, at Columbia University.

From 2015 to 2018, Cofield taught at New York University. In 2021, Cofield was announced as the incoming Chair of Graduate Acting at New York University Tisch School of the Arts for a three-year appointment.

== Martial Arts ==
Cofield is a Black Belt in Brazilian jiu-jitsu.

== Awards ==
- 2022: AUDELCO Award, Best Director of a Play for Twelfth Night for the Classical Theatre of Harlem
- 2021: St. Louis Theatre Circle Award, Outstanding Director of a Drama for King Lear
- 2014: NAACP Theatre Award, Best Director - Local for One Night in Miami
- 2014: LA Weekly Award, Best Director (nominated)
- 2014: L.A. Drama Critics Circle Award
- AUDELCO Awards (nominated numerous times)
