= Hazel Marie Losh =

American astronomer and educator

- Born: August 28, 1898; Blanchester, Ohio
- Died: October 5, 1978 (aged 80); Ann Arbor, Michigan
- Education: University of Michigan, Ann Arbor
- Occupations: Instructor, astronomer
- Parent(s): William Losh; Fannie Homan Losh

Hazel Marie Losh, or “Doc Losh” (August 28, 1898, Blanchester, Ohio — October 5, 1978, Ann Arbor, Michigan), was a well-known professor of undergraduate astronomy at the University of Michigan (U-M) and an enthusiastic University of Michigan sports super-fan.

== Early life and education ==
Losh was born to William and Fannie Homan Losh. In 1920, she graduated with honors from Ohio Wesleyan University in Delaware, Ohio. She then moved to Ann Arbor to earn a master's and Ph.D. in astronomy from the University of Michigan by 1924. During her time at the university, she was a member of Sigma Xi, the Women's Research Club, and the secretary-treasurer of Phi Beta Kappa. Her dissertation, conducted under the guidance of Detroit Observatory Director William J. Hussey, was titled “A Study of the Spectrum of Zeta Tauri”.

In 1924, when asked in an Alumnae Council Survey, “Who are the ten most outstanding women who have ever at any time attended the University of Michigan, considered from the standpoint of human service?”, Losh first responded with fellow Detroit Observatory astronomers Agnes E. Wells and Harriet W. Bigelow.

== Career ==
After receiving her doctorate, Losh went on to pursue a career in astronomy by teaching for a year at Smith College. She then moved to Los Angeles to work as a research assistant in the Solar Department of the Mt. Wilson Observatory from 1926 to 1927. Finally, Losh returned to the University of Michigan and was appointed as an instructor of the astronomy department in 1928 and professor in 1965. Alongside the dissertation, her other publications include “Distribution of Sunspots in Longitude” and “A Laboratory Manual of Astronomy”.

At the beginning of World War II, Losh was balancing a “disproportionate academic load” and so she subsequently decided to focus on undergraduate teaching. It was in this position that she was estimated to have taught 50,000 students during her 41 years teaching at U-M. Hazel Marie Losh was also regarded as the “people’s astronomer” due to her possession of a remarkable ability to explain science in a way that anyone could understand; this made her courses popular on campus. Losh also brought astronomy to the general public with newspaper stories, public lectures, and a monthly radio program titled "Astronomy Report."

== University of Michigan's "number one football fan" ==
Losh prided herself on the fact that she witnessed the very first football game ever played in Michigan Stadium in 1927 against her alma mater, Ohio Wesleyan. Many football fans at the time knew her for her pre-game tradition of walking across the football field at every game, escorted across the field by the M Club as the players ran onto the field under the “Go Blue” banner.

Losh was quoted as saying, "Due to a minor mix-up at the Baylor game last year, I didn’t make my usual crossing. The game turned out to be a tie. Everyone said it happened because I hadn’t made my lucky trip." Losh continued to attend games and carry on this tradition even up to a week before her death. In this final game against Duke University, she was escorted onto the field in a wheelchair by her physician, University of Michigan surgeon Dr. Errol E. Erlandson.

In October 1966, the day before Michigan’s homecoming game against Minnesota, Losh was given a plaque naming her the university’s first homecoming queen “and forever”. After this she was often called Michigan’s “Homecoming Queen for Life”. She was also an honorary member of the lettermen’s M Club and wore a Michigan letter sweater.

Losh was known to be particularly endeared by the university's football players due to her keen interest and fondness of intercollegiate sports. Some highly successful professional athletes taught by Losh include Tom Keating of the Oakland Raiders and Pittsburgh Steelers, Rich Volk of the Baltimore Colts, and Mike Bass of the Washington Redskins. One individual that Losh regarded as “a good student and a great athlete” was Tom Harmon, who went on to become a Heisman trophy winner and prominent sportscaster.

This fondness Losh had for U-M's athletes led to the start of a prominent rumor about Losh's grading scale that stated, “A for athletes, B for boys, and C for co-eds.” Losh's response to this was, "And D for the dummies who believed it.

== Retirement and later years ==
After her tenure from 1927 to 1968, she took on a “semi-retirement”. According to a record detailing Losh's retirement in a University of Michigan Board of Regents meeting (held on July 18, 1969), the sentiment towards Losh was:

The University Regents, in appointing Hazel Losh Professor Emeritus of Astronomy, join her students and faculty peers in thanking her most warmly for her devoted offices. And they cordially invite her to participate in the life of the institution in which she is already a legend.

Throughout her retirement, Losh continued to attend all home hockey, basketball, and football games. Eight years after receiving Emeritus Professor status, she was regarded in newspapers as “an active, popular campus and community personality”

In 1976, Losh received a letter of congratulations on her birthday signed by United States President Gerald Ford and First Lady Betty Ford. Additionally, in 1978, The Ann Arbor City Council proclaimed that her birthday on August 28 be known as “Doc Losh Day in the City of Ann Arbor.”

After a long illness, Losh died in the John Knox Medical Center of Ann Arbor on October 5, 1978. She was 80 years old at the time of her death.

On her tombstone, Losh requested that a quote from “The Old Astronomer to His Pupil” by the 19th century English poet Sarah Williams be inscribed:

I have loved the stars too fondly to be fearful of the night.
