= Montana Wesleyan University =

Former university in Helena, Montana (1889–1923)

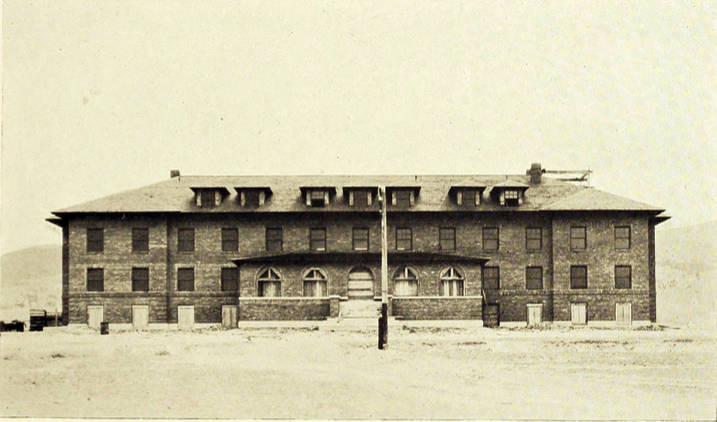
- New Mills Hall
- Other names: Montana Wesleyan College
- Type: Private university
- Active: 1889–1923
- Religious affiliation: Methodist Episcopal Church
- Location: Helena, Montana, U.S.
- Nickname: Panthers

Montana Wesleyan University (1889–1923) was an American university in Helena, Montana, established by the Methodist Episcopal Church (MEC). The school was organized in August 1888 at an annual conference held at Missoula, Montana, and Rev. R. E. Smith was appointed its first president and agent. Fred Gamer furnished the stone for the foundation and plowed the first furrow in 1889. John Paulson was the architect, and D. P. Wortman was the contractor. The school opened in the fall of 1890. A name change occurred in 1898 to Montana Wesleyan College. A 1923 merger of Montana Wesleyan and College of Montana formed Intermountain Union College (now Rocky Mountain College).

== Early history ==
The MEC was one of the first religious institutions to become permanently part of the early Montana Territory mining population. Churches in nearly all the larger cities had already celebrated their semi-centennials. Hand in hand with religious worship, Montana Methodists gave an unusual share of their attention and means to the cause of education. In the minutes of the first Montana MEC Conference, August 2, 1877, a demand was voiced for the establishment of a school of higher grade "to meet the wants of the people who are unable to bear the expense of sending their children to eastern schools." Five years later, in 1882, a committee was appointed to consider the manner of starting an educational institution. Six years later, a field agent was appointed, and in 1889, the Conference determined to locate a school in Helena. The first president of the board of trustees was Col. Wilbur F. Sanders, and the first treasurer was Fred Gamer.

== Prickly Pear campus ==
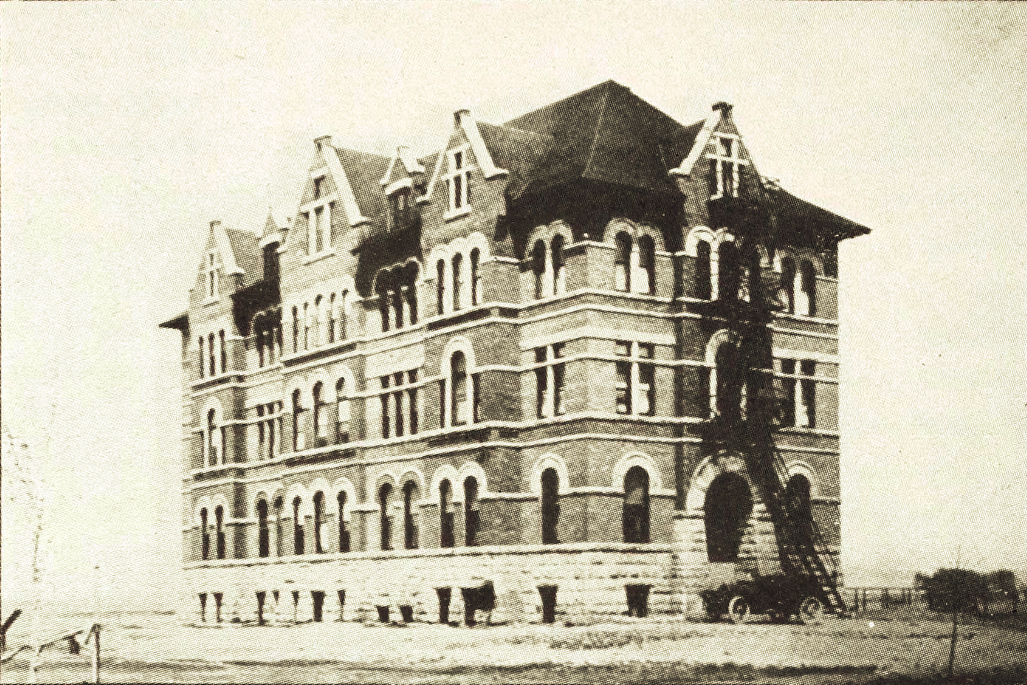
Down in the Valley campus, 1899-1900

Montana Wesleyan University opened its doors to students in 1890 after completing a building in the valley about 6 miles (9.7 km) north of Helena. After streetcar service was discontinued to the Prickly Pear Valley, the location was isolated, but the school did not close its doors. The panic of 1893 and the slow population development of the state were the principal reasons why the institution did not sooner realize the hopes of its projectors.

== Klein campus ==
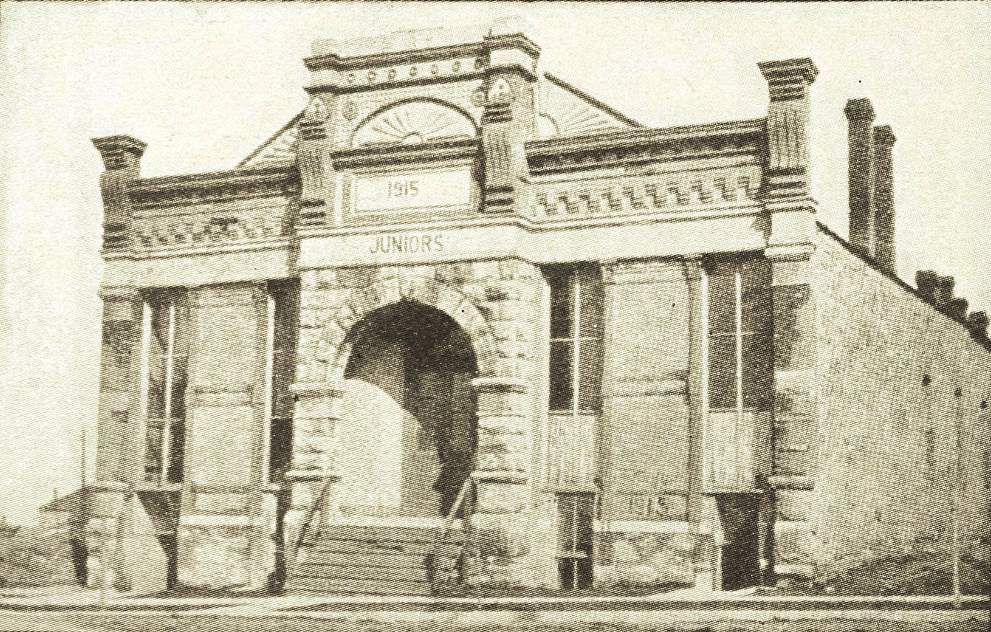
Old College Hall, 1899-1914

In 1900, the school was moved to temporary quarters in the center of Helena. Against many adverse circumstances, it continued its work until January 1914, when the school moved to its present location at Klein Campus. Through the generosity of Henry Klein, a donation of over US$16,000 came to the school.

It was from this fund that the trustees were able to secure a tract of ground 22 acres (8.9 ha) in extent 21/2 blocks from the capitol grounds, calling it the Klein Campus out of respect to the generous donor's name. In the meantime, the original building in the valley, costing about US$7,000, was leased to the Deaconess Association and served as the home of the Montana Deaconess School.

In 1908, the assets of the institution were as follows:

1. Two buildings in the city of Helena: Mills Hall, 645 to 649 North Ewing Street, which served as a dormitory and office building, and College Hall, corner of Warren Street and Helena Avenue.
2. Six blocks and two fractional blocks in the city are located between Lenox and the depot within two squares of the campus of the capitol building, which was designed for a new campus site.
3. A ranch consisting of 155 acres (63 ha) in Fergus County, Montana, known as the Sweetland ranch.
4. Three lots in Whitehall, Montana, donated by Worthy Noble through Rev. George D. King.
5. Some 150 acres (61 ha) of land in Prickly Pear Valley, almost 4 miles (6.4 km) north of Helena, with a sizeable unused building on it. An additional 50 acres (20 ha) were located near the Fred Gamer Ranch.

In 1909, the course of study was revised and modernized to conform to the requirements of the State University, the county high schools of Montana, and the preparatory schools connected with the leading eastern colleges. Steps were taken to make all courses four-year courses. The work in these departments was being carried on by the faculty and teaching force, which numbered eleven in total.

== College campus ==
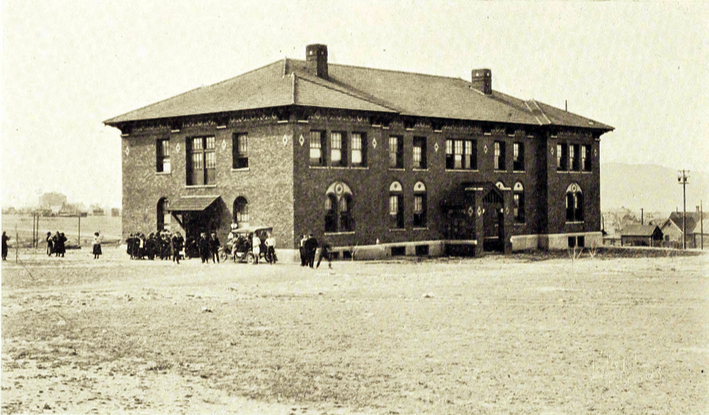
Helena Hall

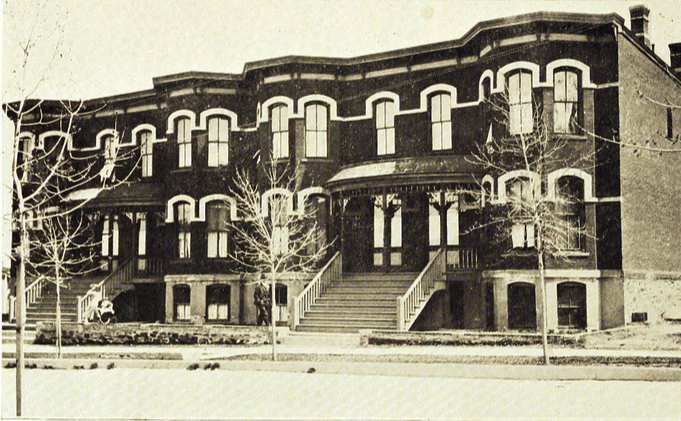
Old Mills Hall

From 1916 to 1921, despite rising costs and other difficulties that confronted trustees of educational institutions all over the country, Montana Wesleyan reached a degree of building and other equipment that enabled it to fulfill the purposes and ideals of the founders thirty years prior. The campus now contained two excellent examples of school architecture, the main administration building being known as Helena Hall, and in 1920, a new dormitory for women, Mills Hall, was completed and occupied. Other buildings convenient to the campus were utilized for dormitory and other purposes, and the students also had access to the many advantages of the capital city, including the State Historical Library, the State Laboratories, the City Library, the YMCA, and all the varied social, religious and civic advantages of Helena.

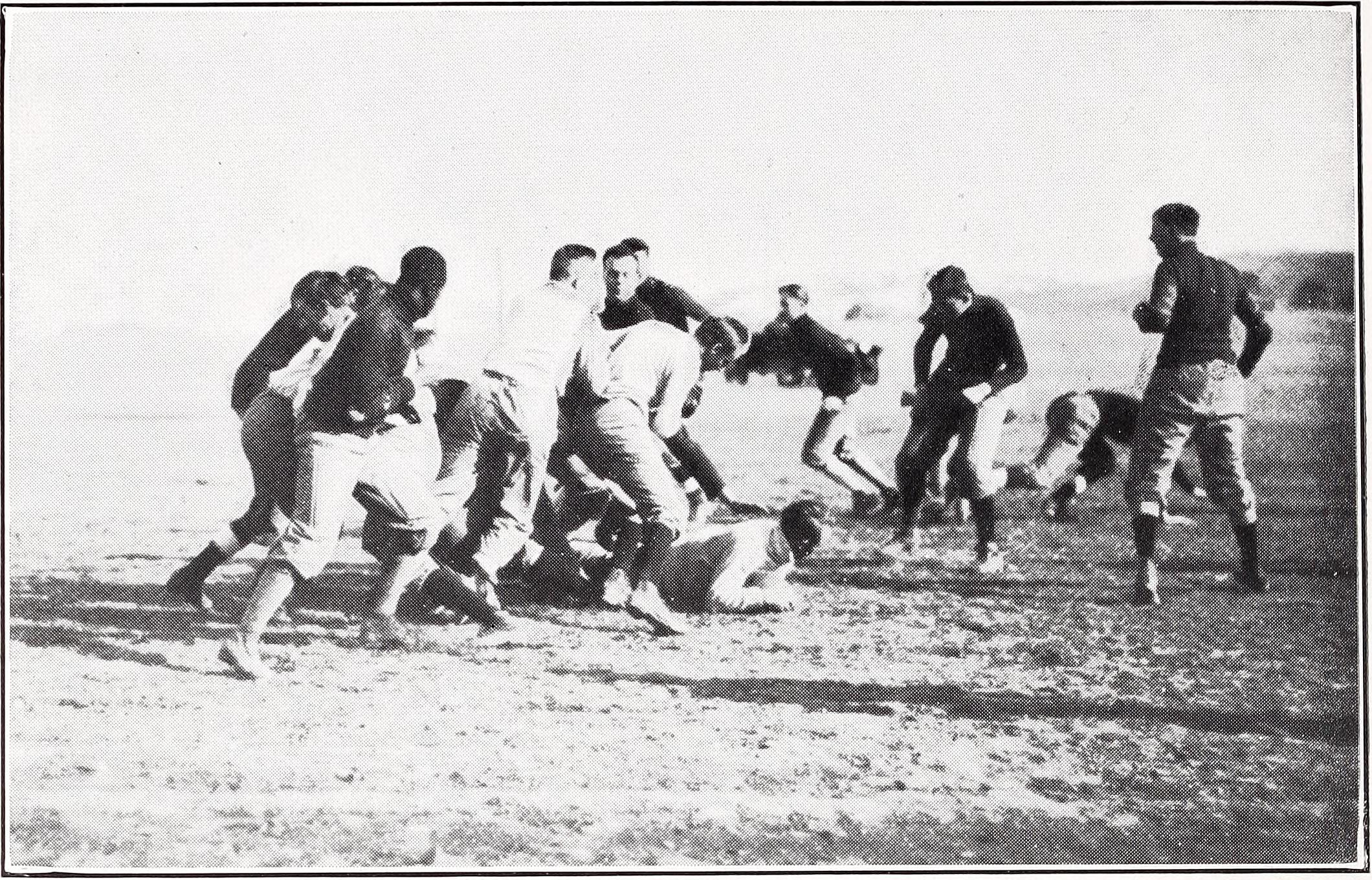
Montana Wesleyan Panthers football

Montana Wesleyan had a complete faculty organization of specialists in their lines of work, and the educational facilities embraced not only the general academic and college courses but also scientific, domestic science, music, and commercial departments.

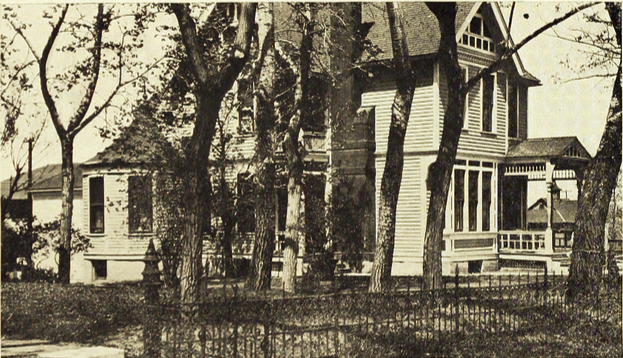
Prexy Flats

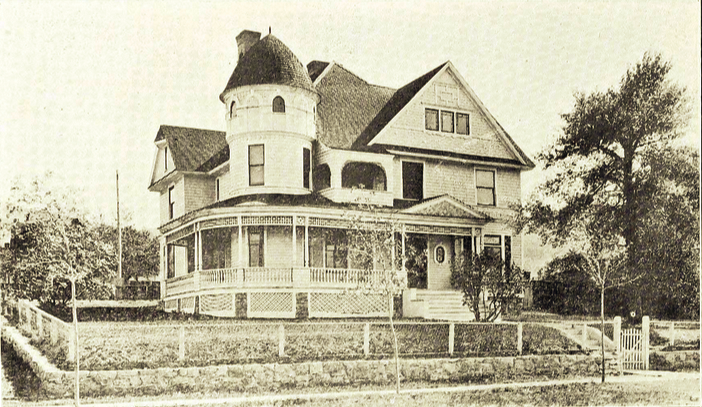
Boys' Dormitory in Lenox Addition

The college was founded by and was the property of the Methodist Episcopal Church, from which it also derived its support. Yet it was denominational only to the extent that its discipline was in harmony with the views of the church that founded and supported it. The school was based on broad Christian principles, such as those commonly held by Protestant churches. It had a positive Christian spirit and atmosphere, neither dogmatic nor sectarian.

== Presidents ==
- Rev. R. E. Smith, president and agent one year
- Rev. F. P. Tower, D. D., president five years
- Prof. J. C. Templeton and Mary S. Cummins were in charge four years
- Rev. Thomas Van Scoy, D. D., president for two years and died in February of his third year
- Rev. George D. King, A. M., president from February to June
- Dr. J. W. Morris, president one year
- C. W. Tenney, principal and president five years
- Robert P. Smith, chancellor; president one year
- C. W. Tenney, president

== Notable people ==
- Laura E. Howey, teacher, Montana Wesleyan University
- Wilbur F. Sanders, first president of the board of trustees, Montana Wesleyan University
