= Mariana Gosnell =

American journalist (1932–2012)

Mariana Eleanor Gosnell (October 28, 1932 – March 23, 2012) was an artist, journalist, photographer, pilot and book author originally from Columbus, Ohio.

== Biography ==
Gosnell graduated cum laude with a Bachelor of Fine Arts from Ohio Wesleyan University and also studied at the Sorbonne in Paris. She worked at Newsweek for 25 years, serving as a reporter covering medicine and science and later as an editor. Her writing also appeared in publications such as Smithsonian and National Wildlife.

She died of cancer in March 2012.

In July 2016, a journalist from The New York Times live-streamed the discovery of a collection of slide photographs discarded near a trash can in New York City. The images were later identified as Gosnell's original photographs. The incident received additional coverage from several online media outlets.

== Works ==
- Zero Three Bravo: Solo Across America in a Small Plane. Touchstone, 1994.
- Ice: The Nature, the History, and the Uses of an Astonishing Substance. University of Chicago Press, 2005.
