= Khoros, LLC =

American software company founded in 2019

Khoros
- Type: Private company
- Industry: Internet
- Founded: 2019
- Headquarters: Austin, Texas, United States
- Key people: Chris Tranquill, CEO
- Services: Digital Care; Online Community Management; Social Media Analytics; Social Media Marketing
- Revenue: $252M
- Number of employees: 900+
- Parent: IgniteTech

Khoros, formerly Spredfast + Lithium, is a global customer engagement software company that provides online community management, social media marketing, social media analytics, digital care, and content management software and services to enterprise brands and agencies. Khoros owns over a dozen patents for social media marketing, online community, and care technologies.

Khoros is headquartered in Austin, Texas, with offices in San Francisco, Portland, New York City, London, Bangalore, Paris, Sydney, and Hamburg. The largest office, with almost 500 employees, is located in Austin. As of 2022, Khoros has over 1,500 employees and works with more than 2,000 brands globally.

In May 2025, Khoros was acquired by IgniteTech. This was followed by mass layoffs.

== History ==
Khoros is the product of a 2019 merger between two software companies: Spredfast and Lithium Technologies.

=== Spredfast ===
Spredfast developed tools to manage social media campaigns and responses. It was founded in 2008 by a group of software engineers and social marketing experts based in Austin, Texas. Spredfast grew quickly as a startup, raising almost $140 million in funding from 2008-2016.

In 2012, Spredfast launched their first annual user conference, the Smart Social Summit, with the goal of helping social media marketers learn from peers and industry leaders. The 2012 event was located in Austin, but due to its popularity, Spredfast held additional Smart Social Summits in New York and London in subsequent years. Speakers at these events have included Michelle Obama, Arianna Huffington, and Trevor Noah.

In April 2014, Spredfast acquired Mass Relevance, a social curation company whose technology aggregates and filters tweets to be displayed on broadcast TV. In August 2015, Spredfast acquired data-focused social marketing company Shoutlet.

Before announcing its merger with Lithium in 2018, Spredfast had more than 500 employees and more than 650 customers in 84 countries.

=== Lithium Technologies ===
Lithium developed community and social media management software. It was founded in 2001 by a group including Dennis Fong, Lyle Fong, Michel Thouati, Kirk Yokomizo, John Joh, Nader Alizadeh, Michael Yang, and Matt Ayres.

In late 2008, Lithium completed a detailed analysis of a decade's worth of proprietary data that represents billions of interactions and millions of users across dozens of communities. This research helped Lithium contribute to a new standard for measuring online community health – the Community Health Index.

On May 11, 2010, Lithium acquired social media monitoring (SMM) provider Scout Labs, whose service allows brands to engage with their customers beyond the community and monitor, map, and measure customer conversations on the social web.

In October 2012, Lithium acquired the Austin-based company Social Dynamx, which provided cloud-based software that allows large call centers to manage their social customer service. Lithium renamed the former Social Dynamx product "Lithium Social Web" and integrated it with its core Lithium Communities product.

On March 27, 2014: Lithium Technologies acquired Klout, a software that rates users’ influence on social media. The higher a user’s “Klout Score,” the more influential they were on social media. Lithium closed the service on May 25, 2018.

In June 2015, Microsoft and Lithium signed a strategic alliance agreement to integrate Lithium social media and community data into Microsoft Dynamics.

=== Merger ===
In May 2017, Lithium announced that it had been acquired by Vista Equity Partners, an Austin-based private equity firm focused on software, data, and technology-enabled businesses. In October 2018, Vista Equity Partners acquired Spredfast and announced that it would be merged with Lithium Technologies.

On March 5, 2019, Spredfast and Lithium formally announced their new name: Khoros, the Greek word for chorus.

In August 2019, Khoros announced that Jack Blaha would take over as chief executive officer. Blaha was formerly CEO at Lone Wolf Technologies, another company in the Vista Equity Partners portfolio.

On September 23, 2019, Khoros opened its new office in Northwest Austin.

=== Acquisitions ===
In January 2021, Khoros acquired two companies: Topbox, an enterprise customer experience (CX) analytics software maker, and Flow.ai, a conversational AI platform for designing and managing chatbots.
