= Murray Banks =

American comedian

Dr. Murray Banks
- Born: July 17, 1917
- Died: August 26, 2008 (aged 91); Rockaway Park, Queens, NY
- Education: Columbia University
- Notable work: "Anyone who goes to a psychiatrist should have his head examined".

Comedy career
- Years active: 1950–1989
- Medium: Lecturer, records, books
- Genre: Observational comedy
- Subjects: American culture, Self-Help, human behavior, psychology

Murray Banks (1917–2008) was a clinical psychologist, and was formerly a full professor of psychology at Long Island University, and at Pace College, NYC, where he headed the psychology department for over five years. He was also a visiting professor and special lecturer on various subjects at the University at North Carolina, New York University, Temple University, New Jersey State Teachers College, University of Pittsburgh, and Brooklyn College.

== Works ==
=== Comedy albums ===
- What You Can Learn From the Kinsey Report (Audio Masterworks, 1956)
- Dr. Murray Banks Speaks on the Drama of Sex (1960)
- Dr. Murray Banks Tells Jewish Stories Mit Psychology in English and Yiddish (1960)
- Dr. Murray Banks Tells More Jewish Stories Mit Psychology in English (1961)
- Just in Case You Think You're Normal (1961)
- A Lesson in Love (1961)
- How To Live With Yourself or What Do Do Until the Psychiatrist Comes (1965)
- How To Quit Smoking in Six Days Or Drop Dead in Seven! (1965)
- Anyone Who Goes To a Psychiatrist Should Have His Head Examined! (1965)

=== Books ===
- Banks, Murray, Dr. (1961). Just in Case You Think You're Normal. Murmill Associates.
- Banks, Murray, Dr. (1965). What to do until psychiatrist comes. Murmill Associates.
- Banks, Murray, Dr. (1965). How to Live with Yourself. Murmill Associates.
- Banks, Murray, Dr. (1982). How to Overcome an Inferiority Complex. Murmill Associates.
- Banks, Murray, Dr. (1982). Stop the World I Want to get Off. Murmill Associates.
