= Orville Nave =

- Born: April 30, 1841; Galion, Ohio
- Died: June 24, 1917 (aged 76); Los Angeles, California
- Education: Ohio Wesleyan University (A.B., 1870; A.M., 1873); Nebraska Wesleyan University (D.D., 1895; LL.D., 1897)
- Spouse: Anna Eliza Semans
- Children: Frederick Solomon Nave
- Parent(s): Solomon P. and Jane Ann (Johnson) Nave
- Church: Methodist Episcopal Church
- Writings: Nave's Topical Bible (1897)

Orville James Nave (April 30, 1841 – June 24, 1917) was an American Methodist theologian and chaplain in the United States Army. He is best known for compiling Nave's Topical Bible, an index of topics addressed in the Christian Bible.

== Early life ==
Orville Nave was born in Galion, Ohio on April 30, 1841. He was the son of Solomon P. and Jane Ann (Johnson) Nave. On August 14, 1862, he enlisted as a private in the 111th Illinois Volunteer Infantry Regiment for service in the Civil War. He continued his service until June 6, 1865.

In 1870, Nave earned a Bachelor of Arts degree from Ohio Wesleyan University. On September 6 of that year, he married Anna Eliza Semans of Delaware, Ohio. The couple had one son, Frederick Solomon Nave, in 1873. They had two daughters, Hermione Nave in 1875 and Junia Nave McMillan in 1891. Orville Nave continued his studies at Ohio Wesleyan, earning a Master of Arts degree in 1873.

== Army chaplain ==
On July 27, 1882, Nave became a chaplain in the U.S. Army. From 1888 to 1894, he served as correspondence secretary of the Corps of Army Chaplains. During this time, he advocated for reforms in the chaplaincy. His insistence that Christian denominations become more involved in the process of selecting chaplains led to the formation of the interdenominational United Christian Commission in 1890. At Nave's recommendation, the Methodist Episcopal Church's 1892 General Conference appointed a three-member board to recommend Methodist clergymen for the chaplaincy. The Conference asked the federal government not to approve any Methodist clergymen as chaplains unless they were approved by this board. Nave's penchant for skipping the chain of command and writing straight to politicians angered his supervisors. Some in the military also charged that his advocacy for greater focus on morality in the armed forces defamed the troops by implying that they were immoral.

Nave earned a Doctor of Divinity degree in 1895 and a Doctor of Law degree in 1897, both from Nebraska Wesleyan University. In 1897, he published his best-known work, Nave's Topical Bible.

During the Spanish–American War, Nave and his wife set up a kitchen to provide for the special dietary needs of sick soldiers at an encampment in Tennessee. He continued his service as an army chaplain and was assigned to the 3rd infantry division in 1901. He retired from the army on April 30, 1905.

== Later life ==
In addition to Nave's Topical Bible, Nave also published the Student's Bible in 1907, as well as several Bible textbooks. In 1914 and 1915, he served as chaplain in chief of the Grand Army of the Republic. On June 24, 1917, Nave died from injuries sustained when he was struck by a street car outside his home in Los Angeles, California.
