= Guardsmark =

Guardsmark was a major provider of security services in North America, Puerto Rico and the United Kingdom. Founded in 1963, Guardsmark was the fourth largest security company and the only major provider privately held by one family. The family-run company employed more than 18,900 people with reported revenues of more than $510,000,000.00 in 2005. It claimed to be one of the largest employers of former FBI agents in the United States as well as one of the most selective employers in its industry.

The firm marketed itself as offering more rigorous screening of applicants, including in many states, the requirement that applicants submit to a polygraph examination and a drug screen for illicit and prescription drugs before hiring. The firm also sought to enhance the image of security officers (eschewing the alternative designation, "security guard"). Among Guardsmark's distinguishing characteristics were its adoption of a formal Code of Ethics in 1980, and the recognition of President Ira A. Lipman and the company for leadership in the field of business ethics, including receipt of the American Business Ethics Award in 1996. Guardsmark was sold to and absorbed by Universal Protection Service in 2015.
