= Alfred Preisser =

American dramatist

Alfred Preisser is an American theater director, playwright, producer and teacher of acting. He currently is the Artistic Director and Theater Director at Harlem School of the Arts.

== Career ==
Preisser is the founder and artistic director of APPI, a New York-based theatrical production company that creates dance, music and theater pieces with universal themes and aggressive interpretations of classics. He is a visiting artist and professor of theatre and directing at City College of New York (CCNY), and is working with Professor Eugene Nesmith, Associate Professor, and Chair in the Department of Theater at CCNY, to create CityArts Theatre (CAT), a professional summer theatre company for the school.

Preisser was the founding artistic director of The Classical Theatre of Harlem from 1999 to 2009, and the director of the Theatre Division at The Harlem School of the Arts from 1999 to 2007. Preisser also worked as a guest director at SAR High School during the 2021-2022 academic year, where he directed productions of The 25th Annual Putnam County Spelling Bee and Peter and the Starcatcher.

Plays by Preisser include Archbishop Supreme Tartuffe and Caligula Maximus, both co-written with Randy Weiner, Electra, Black Nativity Now, co-written with Tracy Jack, Dialogues of Plato's Retreat and Blak Athena.

Award-winning and notable Preisser productions include The Man Who Ate Michael Rockefeller, based on the short story by Christopher Stokes, which had its world premiere in an Off Broadway production at New York's West End Theatre in 2010; his 2009 production of Archbishop Supreme Tartuffe starring André De Shields (four Audelcos); Melvin Van Peebles´ Ain´t Supposed To Die a Natural Death (seven Audelcos); his 2006 production of King Lear with André De Shields, which opened the 75th Anniversary season at The Folger Shakespeare Theatre in Washington, D.C; and his critically acclaimed original adaptations of Caligula, Medea, The Trojan Women and Electra. Other productions in New York include Macbeth, which toured Germany in 2004, Hamlet, Day of Absence, Derek Walcott's Dream on Monkey Mountain, and Romeo and Juliet.

Preisser's theatrical productions have been recognized with the American Theatre Wing Award (Outstanding Artistic Achievement), Drama Desk Award (Artistic Achievement), Edwin Booth Award (Outstanding Contribution to NYC Theater), Lucille Lortel Award (Outstanding Body of Work), two Obie Awards (Sustained Achievement and Excellence in Theatre) and numerous Audelco Awards.

== Projects in the works ==
Preisser and co-writer Randy Weiner's Caligula Maximus, an outrageous theatrical extravaganza, combining elements of a circus, a play with music, and a nightclub installation, was helmed by Preisser in the Spring of 2010 at La MaMa's Ellen Stewart Theatre, had a twice extended run, and is in development for a commercial run this Fall. Preisser and Tracy Jack's annual Christmas dance-concert Black Nativity Now at Theatre at St. Clements, opens December 2010; and in 2011, Preisser will present a multi-city tour of Ain´t Supposed To Die a Natural Death by Melvin Van Peebles, to mark the 40th Anniversary of that seminal American spoken word musical.
