= Robert P. Smith (pastor) =

Montana pastor and author

Robert Phillip Smith
- Born: April 7, 1863; Grove Port, Ohio, US
- Died: 1945 (aged 81–82)
- Education: Ohio Normal University, 1886; Ohio Wesleyan University, D.D. 1895
- Known for: Writing and pastoring
- Spouse: Jennie Patrick (married 1893-1945)
- Children: Ruth Smith Linfield, Lois Smith Linfield

Reverend Robert Phillip Smith (1863–1945) was an American educator, pastor, and published writer who spent most of his life between Ohio and Montana.

== Early life ==
Robert P. Smith was born on April 7, 1963, in Grove Point, Ohio. Smith spent his childhood on a farm with his large family, including his parents (Stephen and Abigail) from England, three brothers, and two sisters. Smith received his degrees in Liberal Arts and Science in 1886 from Ohio Normal University. From Ohio Wesleyan University, Smith would then receive his Doctorate of Divinity in 1895. On June 15, 1893, Smith married Jennie Patrick. Later, they would have two children, Ruth Smith Linfield, and Lois Smith.

== Career and Retirement ==
Smith first left Ohio to teach Greek at Intermountain Union in Billings, Montana. When the college was reported to have been facing severe debt in 1903, Smith became chancellor of Montana Wesleyan University, and then its president in 1907. However, from 1908 to 1915, he served as president of Kansas Wesleyan. Even after a faculty dispute that drove Smith to resign from his role at Kansas Wesleyan, his impact on the university and the quality of his sermons were largely appreciated at the time by his peers.

Smith moved back to Montana to serve as a pastor across the state for over 30 years. During this time, Smith traveled to Edinburgh, Scotland to attend the Rotary International Convention in 1921. Smith retired in 1930, yet continued to serve the Bozeman Methodist Episcopal Church, West Yellowstone Church, and the Deaconess Hospital as a member of their Board of Directors. After only a year serving as a trustee at this hospital, his 1916 report for its 50th anniversary prompted construction of a new hospital completed by 1920.

Around this time especially, the surrounding public seemed generally interested in his public speaking, with reports of him being "called upon 216 times for College, High School, and Patriotic addresses outside his own charges." One of his most popular lectures was "Lincoln, the Man," which was requested 65 times by different organizations and people, and inspired the third, most extensive biography on Smith, which was written in December 1965 as a term paper. Even earlier, Smith was acknowledged for the influence of his sermons, with a text synthesizing the history of Kansas Wesleyan University quoting Smith during one of these sermons: "Do not miss the aim of college...It is intended to help us to discover ourselves and our natural aptitudes, to arouse us from lethargy and self- complacency, to teach us to aspire and strive for the ideal."

Smith's written work mostly includes religious tracts and books. Two of these publications include "The Spiritual Value of Work" and "Religious Optimism." Collections of Robert P. Smith's works and biographical documents can be found at Montana State University's Archives and Special Collections.

Around August 31 and September 1, 1945, Smith died, and in this same year, the second of three biographies was written about him.
