= Herbert L. Henkel =

Herbert L. Henkel was elected chairman of the Board of Directors of Ingersoll-Rand Company in May 2000. Also, he retained his previous titles of president and chief executive officer of the company. He graduated from Brooklyn Technical High School. Henkel holds a bachelor of science degree in aerospace engineering and applied mechanics, and a master of science degree in mechanical engineering from Polytechnic University (now New York University Polytechnic School of Engineering). Also, he holds a master's degree in business administration from Pace University's Lubin School of Business. He is currently a board member at Allstate.
