= The China Review =

Academic journal

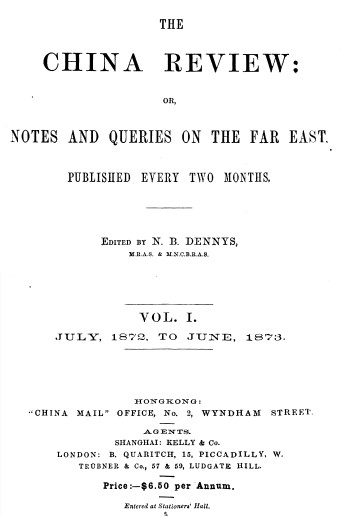
China Review Vol I 1872-73

The China Review: Or, Notes and Queries on the Far East was an academic journal published in Hong Kong from 1872 to 1901 as an outlet for scholarly writings on China written by foreign scholars, mainly those living on the China coast. The journal was edited in its initial years by Nicholas Belfeld Dennys, editor of the China Mail, a Hong Kong newspaper. In the first volume, Dennys stated that the review would include original papers on "the Arts and Sciences, Ethnology, Folklore, Geography, History, Literature, Mythology, Manners and Customs, Natural History, Religion, etc." and would cover "China, Japan, Mongolia, Tibet, The Eastern Archipelago, and the 'Far East' generally." He noted that the purpose was similar to Notes and Queries on China and Japan, which had ceased publication in 1869. The second editor-in-chief was Ernst Johann Eitel, a former missionary of the Basel Mission and the London Missionary Society. The journal was not supported by any church, but missionaries frequently published articles of sinological interest.

The journal was published from 1872 to July, 1901, a total of twenty-five volumes.
