= Engagio =

American software company

Engagio Inc.
- Industry: Marketing software
- Founded: 2015; 11 years ago
- Founders: Jon Miller; Brian Babcock
- Headquarters: San Mateo, California, United States
- Area served: Worldwide
- Key people: Jon Miller (CEO); Brian Babcock (CTO)
- Products: PlayMaker, Account Based Marketing
- Parent: Demandbase
- Website: www.engagio.com

Engagio was an American software company based in San Mateo, California marketing a B2B Account Based Marketing platform for account-based initiatives. It was acquired by Demandbase in 2020.

== History ==
Engagio was founded in early 2015 by Jon Miller, co-founder of marketing automation company Marketo, and Brian Babcock. Motivated by trends he saw while working as vice president of marketing for Marketo, Babcock developed the idea for Engagio, a company which advised B2B firms on how to tailor marketing campaigns towards specific customer niches rather than focusing on building demand more generally.

By 2019, Engagio was providing software to many prominent tech companies, including Anaplan, Snowflake Computing, Hortonworks, New Relic, Pendo, and JDA Software.

In 2020, Engagio was acquired by the marketing firm Demandbase. The Demandbase CEO at the time, Gabe Rogol, described the acquisition as requiring that the sales and marketing teams "must start moving as one." This came to fruition in 2023 when Engagio announced a new software for their existing service, Dash, which promised to provide combined analysis of marketing and sales in one tool.
