= Anaplan =

American software company

Anaplan, Inc.
- Type: Private
- Traded as: NYSE: PLAN; (2018–2022)
- Industry: Enterprise Performance Management, Software Company
- Founded: 2006; 20 years ago in Yorkshire, England
- Founder: Guy Haddleton; Sue Haddleton; Michael Gould
- Headquarters: Miami, Florida
- Number of locations: 13 countries
- Area served: Worldwide
- Key people: Charles Gottdiener (CEO); Hemant Kapadia (CFO); Adam Thier (CTO)
- Products: Anaplan Platform
- Revenue: ▲US$592.2 million (2022)
- Owner: Thoma Bravo
- Number of employees: 2,200+ (Jan 2022)
- Website: www.anaplan.com

Anaplan is a business planning software company headquartered in Miami, Florida. Anaplan sells subscriptions for cloud-based business-planning software and provides data for decision-making purposes.

== History ==
In 2006, Anaplan was founded by Guy Haddleton, Sue Haddleton, and Michael Gould in Yorkshire, England.

In 2012, Anaplan brought on Frederic Laluyaux as CEO. Laluyaux eventually left the company four years later in April 2016.

A year after Laluyaux became CEO, Anaplan acquired its reseller Vue Analytics in U.K. for an undisclosed amount.

=== Recent history ===
In May 2014, Anaplan introduced its marketplace, Anaplan Hub. Using the marketplace, customers can share and find pre-designed planning models.

After multiple rounds of funding, to assist with going public, the company hired James Budge as its chief financial officer. In 2016, Anaplan had over 480 customers in 20 countries.

In April 2016 Anaplan acquired data analytics brand Chartcube.

In January 2017 Anaplan appointed Frank A. Calderoni as CEO. Calderoni took the company public on October 12, 2018, with Anaplan being listed on the NYSE under the ticker symbol PLAN.

In August 2019, Anaplan announced plans to acquire Mintigo, an Israeli-founded predictive marketing and sales analytics company. In November, the company was named to Deloitte Technology Fast 500.

In March 2022, the private equity firm Thoma Bravo announced a definitive agreement to purchase Anaplan for $10.7 billion. The deal closed in June 2022. Thoma Bravo renegotiated the deal to $10.4 billion, stating that Anaplan had breached the merger agreement by overpaying new workers, although commentators linked the renegotiation to the broader market downturn.

Also in 2022, Anaplan announced the acquisition of the applications division from existing partner Vuealta.

In June 2023, Anaplan began a round of major layoff, ranging from 119 to 500 employees.

== Funding ==
Anaplan raised its first venture capital funding within a year of its first sales in 2010. In 2012, the company raised $11.4 million in Series B financing from investors that included Granite Ventures and Shasta Ventures.

Then, in 2014, the company's Series D funding raised $100 million from new and existing investors including DFJ Growth, Workday, and Shasta Ventures. In 2016, Anaplan raised $90 million and became the second UK-founded company to achieve a $1 billion valuation.

Premji Invest led the fundraising, and was joined by Baillie Gifford, Founders Circle Capital, Harmony Partners, and Anaplan's then-current investors. As of January 2016, Anaplan had raised a total of $240 million in five funding rounds.

== Technology ==
Anaplan's Hyperblock technology is a patented in-memory database and calculation engine for business planning.

In November 2014, Anaplan announced the launch of the Anaplan App Hub for business planning applications.
