= AlliedBarton =

Facility services and security company

- Type: Private
- Industry: Security
- Founded: 1957; Pittsburgh, Pennsylvania, U.S.
- Defunct: 2017
- Fate: Merged with Universal Services of America
- Successor: Allied Universal
- Headquarters: Conshohocken, Pennsylvania, U.S.
- Website: alliedbarton.com (archived 2013)

AlliedBarton was a security company based in Conshohocken, Pennsylvania, a suburb of Philadelphia. The company was founded in 1957 as Allied Security. In 2016 it merged with a security and janitorial services company, Universal Services of America of Santa Ana, California forming Allied Universal.

== History ==
AlliedBarton began as Allied Security in 1957 in Pittsburgh, a provider of contracted security guards and related services.

In 2000, King of Prussia, Pennsylvania-based Spectaguard acquired Allied Security and took on the Allied Security name. The new company was reportedly the fourth largest security company in the United States, as well as the largest privately held security company in the U.S.

In 2004, Allied Security acquired Security Systems Inc. (SSI) of Malden, Massachusetts north of Boston and Atlanta-based Barton Protective Services to form AlliedBarton Security Services-creating the largest American-owned contract security services company in the United States. In 2004 and also in 2008, Allied Barton bid but failed to acquire M & M Investigations & Enforcement Bureau of Toledo, Ohio. In 2006, AlliedBarton acquired San Antonio, Texas-based Initial Security, a guard company, for $73.6 million. In 2008, The Blackstone Group of New York City acquired AlliedBarton, for an undisclosed amount. In July 2015, Paris-based private investment firm Wendel acquired AlliedBarton from The Blackstone Group for US$1.67 billion.

In 2016, AlliedBarton and Universal Services of America merged to form Allied Universal. In February 2017, the company officially began operations under its new name. After the merger, Allied Universal is considered to.be the largest security company in North America.

== Services ==
AlliedBarton provided uniformed security services.
