= Nave's Topical Bible =

Nave's Topical Bible

Nave's Topical Bible is a book written by Orville James Nave (1841–1917) and published by Thomas Nelson Publishers. Nave was a chaplain in the United States Army and referred to his work as "the result of fourteen years of delight and untiring study of the Word of God." It is a topical concordance of the Bible, and contains Biblical references to over 20,000 topics. Scripture is quoted over 100,000 times; the same Scripture citation may appear under several headings.

The topic headings are broad, covering many religious concepts, geographical regions, and names of Biblical figures. While theological concepts such as salvation and worship are included, a wide range of topics, such as Biblical references to ropes, are also included. This reflects the author's intention, as stated in the book's preface, to "note and classify everything found in the Scriptures".

The book took fourteen years to complete. Its original copyrights were 1896 and 1897. Until at least 1907 the book was published by the Topical Bible Publishing Company of Lincoln, Nebraska. At least seven editions have been published, based on the King James Version and Revised Version of the Bible. Each verse of the Bible is indexed according to the topics it is classified under. Christian figures such as Billy Graham have endorsed the book.
