= Sociology of health and illness =

Branch of sociology

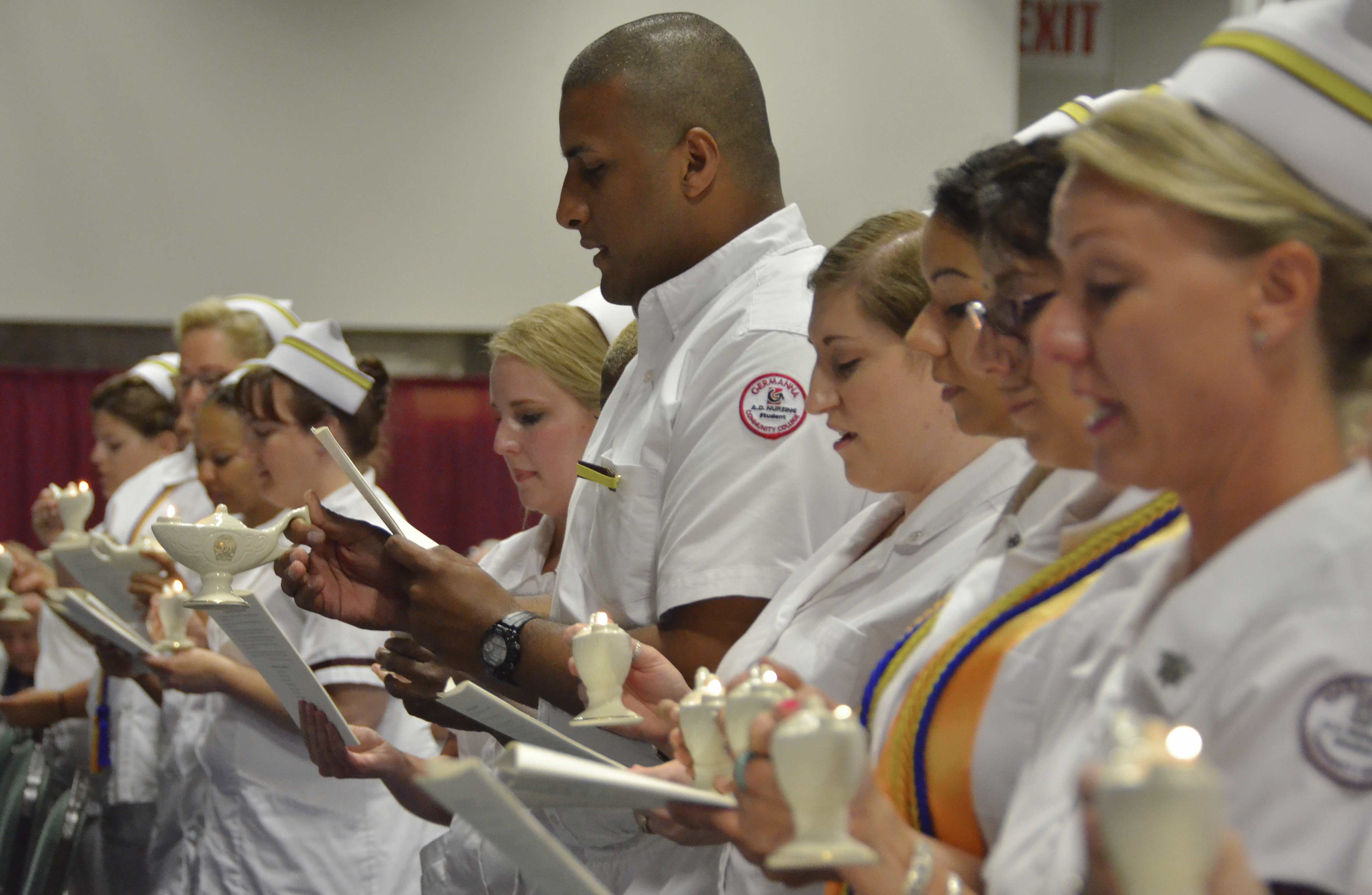
Nursing student graduate (center) participates in the reading of the International Nurses' Pledge during Germanna Community College's Nursing and Health Technologies convocation, held at the Fredericksburg Expo and Conference Center in Fredericksburg, Virginia, USA.

The sociology of health and illness, sociology of health and wellness, or health sociology examines the interaction between society and health. As a field of study it is interested in all aspects of life, including contemporary as well as historical influences, that impact and alter health and wellbeing.

It establishes that, from birth to death, social processes interweave and influence health and wellbeing. These influences may include location of upbringing, how illness is understood and framed by immediate community members, or the impact that technology has on health. As such, it outlines that both health and the medical science that engages it are social constructs; that the way of knowing illness, wellbeing, and interactions with them are socially interpreted.

Health sociology uses this insight to critique long-established ideas around the human body as a mechanical entity alongside disrupting the idea that the mind and body can be treated as distinct spaces. This biomedical model is viewed as not holistically placing humans within the wider social, cultural, economic, political, and environmental contexts that play a large part in how health and wellbeing are deprived, maintained, or improved. Alternative models include the biopsychosocial model which aims to incorporate these elements alongside the psychological aspect of the mind.

This field of research acts as a broad school overlapping with areas like the sociology of medicine, sociology of the body, sociology of disease to wider sociologies like that of the family or education as they contribute insights from their distinct focuses on the life-course of health and wellness.

== Theoretical perspectives ==
The field of sociology of health and illness has been shaped by the perspectives and contributing works of various authors that have enabled its development. Multiple research studies touch on the relationship between the patient and doctor as well as their environment within the healthcare system. One of the founders of the sociology of health and illness is Talcott Parsons, an American sociologist, who analyzed the relationship between patients and their doctors in his book The Social System written in 1951. In his sick role theory, he argued that people who were sick adopted a social role, not just a biological condition. Those who were sick deviated from social roles were unable to fulfill their respective functions, thus if too many people claimed to be ill, this would create a dysfunctional society that needed regulating. Creating this mechanism would prevent people who were pretending to be sick to form a subculture of being sick. By developing the “sick role mechanism” patients and doctors had to abide by a set of “rights” and “obligations” that would monitor entry into the sick role. The “rights” of a patient constituted an exemption from performing their respective social roles, such as going to work or housekeeping with the further exemption being given to those severely ill. These rights were given if they maintained two obligations, the first being that they had to view being sick as undesirable and thus must find a way to get better. Second, after a while of being sick, the person must seek the help of a doctor and follow their advice in other to alleviate their illness. The “obligations” of the doctors were to be trained in their field, be motivated to help the patient, have objective and emotional detachment from the patient, and be bound by the rules of professional conduct. Their “rights” consisted of being able to examine the patient physically and ask about their personal life, and have a position of authority and autonomy in their professional practice. Lastly, receive status and reward from their important role in society. Parson’s perspective. In addition, Michel Foucault published The Birth of the Clinic in 1963, in which he developed his theory of the “medical gaze” referring to how doctors filter patient information into a biomedical paradigm, which focuses solely on biological factors excluding how social, environmental and psychological factors can influence a patient’s condition. According to Foucault doctors are trained to be doctor-oriented rather than patient-oriented, which creates a form of abusive power structure. Among these authors have contributed to the development of the field of health and illness by bringing in their perspectives at the time.

== Historical background ==
Humans have long sought advice from those with knowledge or skill in healing. Paleopathology and other historical records, allow an examination of how ancient societies dealt with illness and outbreak. Rulers in Ancient Egypt sponsored physicians that were specialists in specific diseases. Imhotep was the first medical doctor known by name. An Egyptian who lived around 2650 B.C., he was an adviser to King Zoser at a time when Egyptians were making progress in medicine. Among his contributions to medicine was a textbook on the treatment of wounds, broken bones, and even tumors.

Stopping the spread of infectious disease was of utmost importance for maintaining a healthy society. The outbreak of disease during the Peloponnesian War was recorded by Thucydides who survived the epidemic. From his account it is shown how factors outside the disease itself can affect society. The Athenians were under siege and concentrated within the city. Major city centers were the hardest hit. This made the outbreak even more deadly and with probable food shortages the fate of Athens was inevitable. Approximately 25% of the population died of the disease. Thucydides stated that the epidemic "carried away all alike". The disease attacked people of different ages, sexes and nationalities.

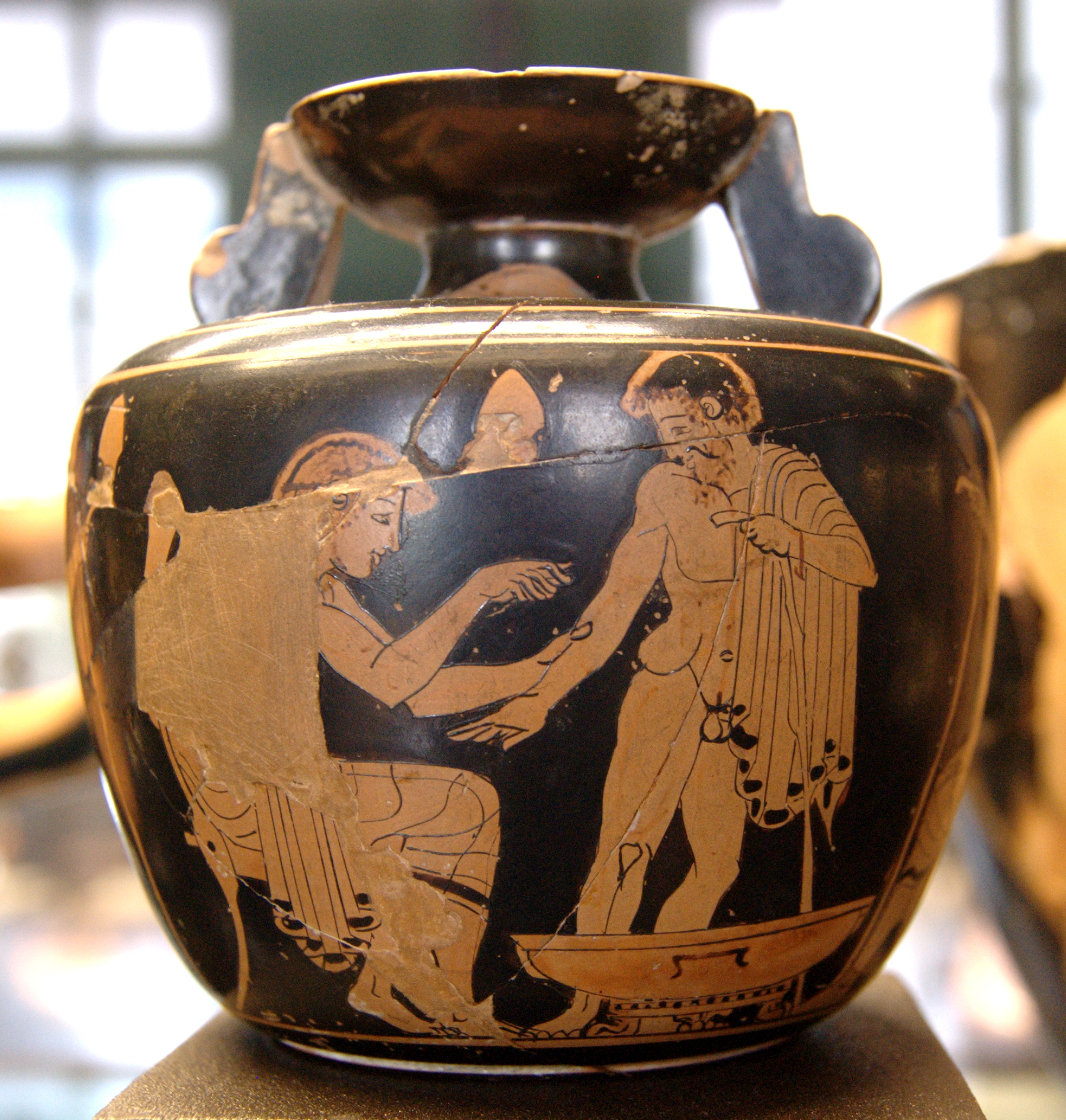
Physician in Ancient Greece treating a patient 480–470 BC

Ancient medical systems stressed the importance of reducing illness through divination and ritual. Other codes of behavior and dietary protocols were widespread in the ancient world. During the Zhou dynasty in China, doctors suggested exercise, meditation and temperance to preserve one's health. The Chinese closely link health with spiritual well-being. Health regimes in ancient India focused on oral health as the best method for a healthy life. The Talmudic code created rules for health which stressed ritual cleanliness, connected disease with certain animals and created diets. Other examples include the Mosaic Code and Roman baths and aqueducts.

Those that were most concerned with health, sanitation and illness in the ancient world were those in the elite class. Good health was thought to reduce the risk of spiritual defilement and therefore enhanced the social status of the ruling class who saw themselves as the beacon of civilization. During the late Roman Period, sanitation for the lower classes was a concern for the leisured class. Those that had the means would donate to charities that focused on the health of non-elites. After the decline of the Roman Empire, physicians and concern with public health disappeared except in the largest cities. Health and public doctors remained in the Byzantine Empire. Focusing on preventing the spread of diseases such as small pox lead to a smaller mortality rate in much of the western world. Other factors that allowed the modern rise in population include: better nutrition and environmental reforms (such as getting clean water supplies).

The present day sense of health being a public concern for the state began in the Middle Ages. A few state interventions include maintaining clean towns, enforcing quarantines during epidemics and supervising sewer systems. Private corporations also played a role in public health. The funding for research and the institutions for them to work were funded by governments and private firms. Epidemics were the cause of most government interventions. The early goal of public health was reactionary whereas the modern goal is to prevent disease before it becomes a problem. Despite the overall improvement of world health, there still has not been any decrease in the health gap between the affluent and the impoverished. Today, society is more likely to blame health issues on the individual rather than society as a whole. This was the prevailing view in the late 20th century. In the 1980s the Black Report, published in the United Kingdom, went against this view and argued that the true root of the problem was material deprivation. This report proposed a comprehensive anti-poverty strategy to address these issues. Since this did not parallel the views of the Conservative government, it did not go into action immediately. The Conservative government was criticized by the Labour Party for not implementing the suggestions that the Black Report listed. This criticism gave the Black Report the exposure it needed and its arguments were considered a valid explanation for health inequality. There is also a debate over whether poverty causes ill-health or if ill-health causes poverty. Arguments by the National Health Service gave considerable emphasis to poverty and lack of access to health care. It has also been found that heredity has more of a bearing on health than social environment, but research has also proved that there is indeed a positive correlation between socioeconomic inequalities and illness.

== Methodology ==
The Sociology of Health and Illness focuses on three areas: the conceptualization, the study of measurement and social distribution, and the justification of patterns in health and illness. By looking at these things researchers can look at different diseases through a sociological lens. The prevalence and response to different diseases varies by culture. By looking at bad health, researchers can see if health affects different social regulations or controls. When measuring the distribution of health and illness, it is useful to look at official statistics and community surveys. Official statistics make it possible to look at people who have been treated. It shows that they are both willing and able to use health services. It also sheds light on the infected person's view of their illness. On the other hand, community surveys look at people's rating of their health. Then looking at the relation of clinically defined illness and self reports and find that there is often a discrepancy.

A great deal of the time, mortality statistics take the place of the morbidity statistics because in multiple developed societies where people typically die from degenerative conditions, the age in which they die sheds more light on their life-time health. This produces multiple limitations when looking at the pattern of sickness, but sociologists try to look at various data to analyze the distribution better. Normally, developing societies have lower life expectancies in comparison to developed countries. They have also found correlations between mortality and sex and age. Very young and old people are more susceptible to sickness and death. On average women typically live longer than men, although women are more likely to have bad health.

>80 77.5–80 75–77.5 72.5–75 70–72.5 / 67.5–70 65–67.5 60–65 55–60 50–55; Life expectancy by region in 2015

Disparities in health were also found between people in different social classes and ethnicities within the same society, even though in the medical profession they put more importance in "health related behaviors" such as alcohol consumption, smoking, diet, and exercise. There is a great deal of data supporting the conclusion that these behaviors affect health more significantly than other factors. Sociologists think that it is more helpful to look at health and illness through a broad lens. Sociologists agree that alcohol consumption, smoking, diet, and exercise are important issues, but they also see the importance of analyzing the cultural factors that affect these patterns. Sociologists also look at the effects that the productive process has on health and illness. While also looking at things such as industrial pollution, environmental pollution, accidents at work, and stress-related diseases.

Social factors play a significant role in developing health and illness. Studies of epidemiology show that autonomy and control in the workplace are vital factors in the etiology of heart disease. One cause is an effort-reward imbalance. Decreasing career advancement opportunities and major imbalances in control over work have been coupled with various negative health costs. Various studies have shown that pension rights may shed light on mortality differences between retired men and women of different socioeconomic statuses. These studies show that there are outside factors that influence health and illness.

== International perspective ==
=== Africa ===
Estimation of the number of adults in Africa who are infected with HIV or AIDS. Note that levels of infection are much higher in sub-Saharan Africa.

HIV/AIDS is the leading epidemic that affects the social welfare of Africa. Human Immunodeficiency virus (HIV) can cause AIDS which is an acronym for Acquired Immunodeficiency Syndrome (AIDS), a condition in humans in which the immune system begins to fail, leading to life-threatening infections. Two-thirds of the world's HIV population is located in Sub-Saharan Africa. Since the epidemic started more than 15 million Africans have died by complications with HIV/AIDS.

People who are a part of religious sub-groups of Sub-Saharan Africa, and those who actively and frequently participate in religious activities, are more likely to be at a lower risk of contracting HIV/AIDS. On the opposite end, there are beliefs that an infected male can be cured of the infection by having sex with a virgin. These beliefs increase the number of people with the virus and also increase the number of rapes against women.

Herbal treatment is one of the primary medicines used to treat HIV in Africa. It is used more than standard treatment because it is more affordable. Herbal treatment is more affordable but is not researched and is poorly regulated. This lack of research on whether the herbal medicines work and what the medicines consist of is a major flaw in the healing cycle of HIV in Africa.

Economically, HIV has a significant negative effect. The labor force in Africa is slowly diminishing, due to HIV-related deaths and illness. In response, government income declines and so does tax revenue. The government has to spend more money than it is making, in order to care for those affected with HIV/AIDS.

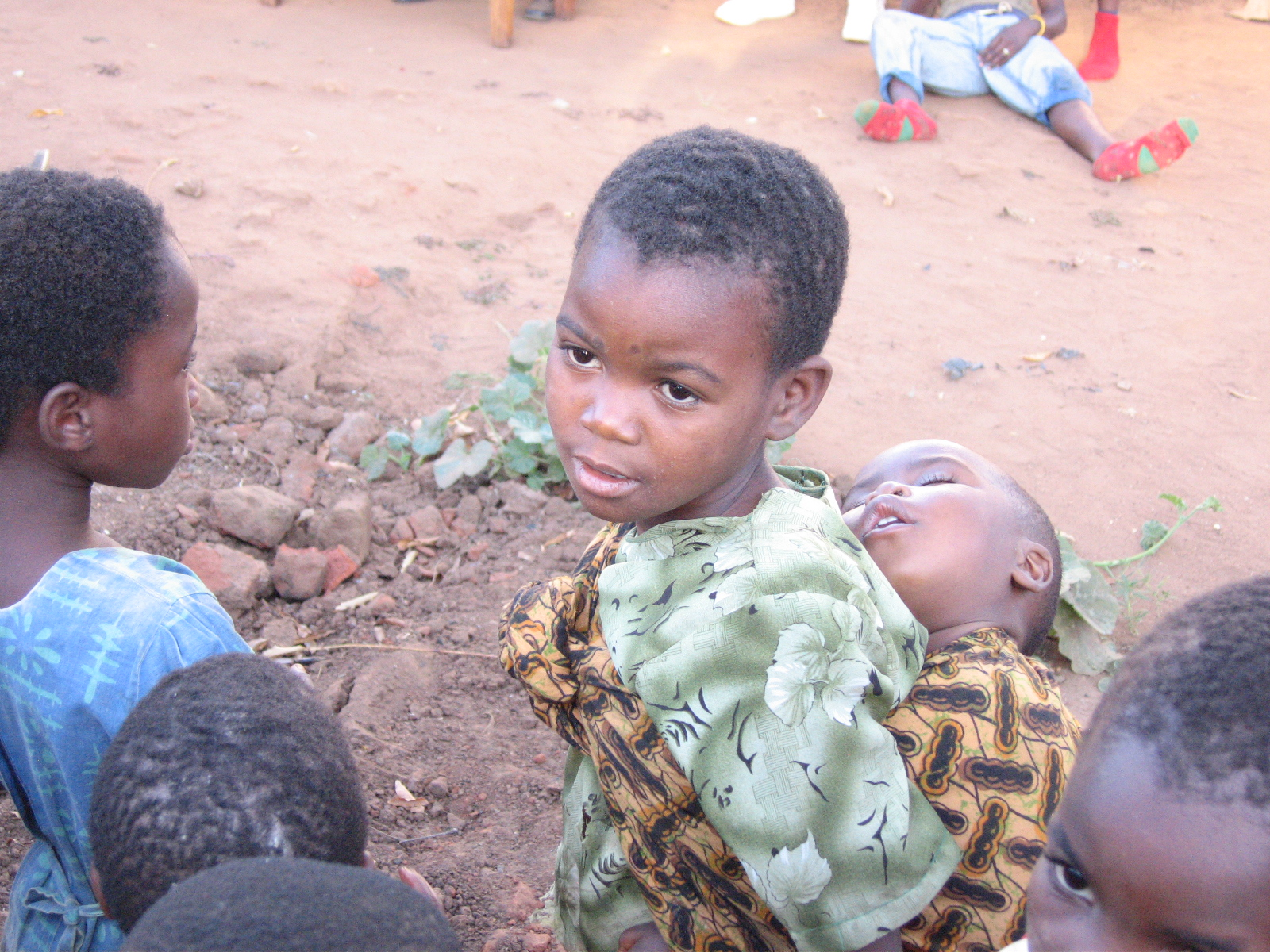
AIDS orphans in Malawi

A major social problem in Africa in regards to HIV is the orphan epidemic. The orphan epidemic in Africa is a regional problem. In most cases, both of the parents are affected with HIV. Due to this, the children are usually raised by their grandmothers and in extreme cases they are raised by themselves. In order to care for the sick parents, the children have to take on more responsibility by working to produce an income. Not only do the children lose their parents but they also lose their childhood as well. Having to provide care for their parents, the children also miss out on an education which increases the risk of teen pregnancy and people affected with HIV. The most efficient way to diminish the orphan epidemic is prevention: preventing children from acquiring HIV from their mothers at birth, as well as educating them on the disease as they grow older. Also, educating adults about HIV and caring for the infected people adequately will lower the orphan population.

The HIV/AIDS epidemic is reducing the average life expectancy of people in Africa by twenty years. The age range with the highest death rates, due to HIV, are those between the ages of 20 and 49 years. The fact that this age range is when adults acquire most of their income means they often cannot afford to send their children to school due to the high medication costs. It also removes the people who could help aid in responding to the epidemic.

=== Asia ===
Asian countries have wide variations of population, wealth, technology and health care, causing attitudes towards health and illness to differ. Japan, for example, has the third highest life expectancy (82 years old), while Afghanistan has the 11th worst (44 years old). Key issues in Asian health include childbirth and maternal health, HIV and AIDS, mental health, and aging and the elderly. These problems are influenced by the sociological factors of religion or belief systems, attempts to reconcile traditional medicinal practices with modern professionalism, and the economic status of the inhabitants of Asia.

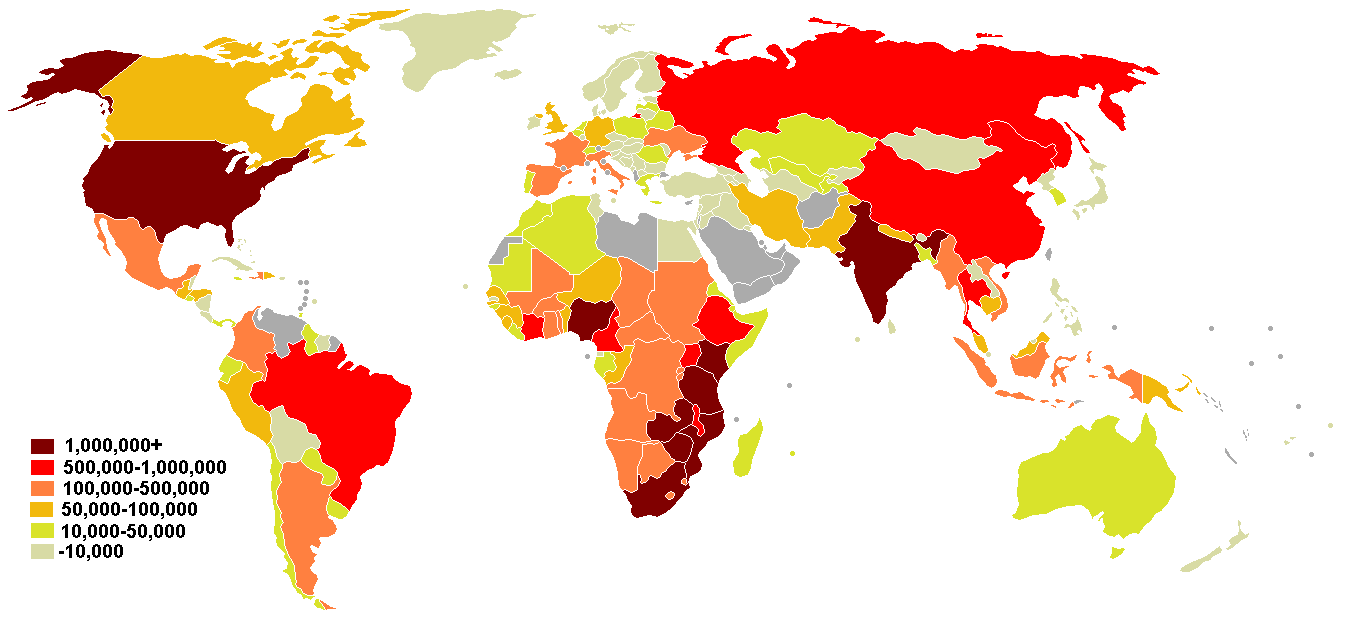
People living with HIV/AIDS

Like the rest of the world, Asia is threatened by a possible pandemic of HIV and AIDS. Vietnam is a good example of how society is shaping Asian HIV/AIDS awareness and attitudes towards this disease. Vietnam is a country with feudal, traditional roots, which, due to invasion, wars, technology and travel is becoming increasingly globalized. Globalization has altered traditional viewpoints and values. It is also responsible for the spread of HIV and AIDS in Vietnam. Even early globalization has added to this problem – Chinese influence made Vietnam a Confucian society, in which women are of less importance than men. Men in their superiority have no need to be sexually responsible, and women, generally not well educated, are often unaware of the risk, perpetuating the spread of HIV and AIDS as well as other STIs.

Confucianism has had a strong influence on the belief system in Asia for centuries, particularly in China, Japan, and Korea, and its influence can be seen in the way people chose to seek, or not seek, medical care. An important issue in Asia is societal effect on the ability of disabled individuals to adjust to a disability. Cultural beliefs shape attitudes towards physical and mental disabilities. China exemplifies this problem. According to Chinese Confucian tradition (which is also applicable in other countries where Confucianism has been spread), people should always pursue good health in their lives, with an emphasis on health promotion and disease prevention. To the Chinese, having a disability signifies that one has not led a proper lifestyle and therefore there is a lack of opportunities for disabled individuals to explore better ways to accept or adapt to their disability.

Indigenous healing practices are extremely diverse throughout Asia but often follow certain patterns and are still prevalent today. Some traditional healing practices include shamanism and herbal medicines, and may have been passed down orally in small groups or even institutionalized and professionalized. In multiple developing countries the only health care available until a few decades ago were those based on traditional medicine and spiritual healing. Now governments must be careful to create health policies that strike a balance between modernity and tradition. Organizations, like the World Health Organization, try to create policies that respect tradition without trying to replace it with modern science, instead regulating it to ensure safety but keeping it accessible. India in particular tries to make traditional medicines safe but still available to as many people as possible, adapting tradition to match modernization while still considering the economic positions and culture of its citizens.

Flag of World Health Organization

Mental health issues are gaining an increasing amount of attention in the Asian countries. A number of these countries have a preoccupation with modernizing and developing their economies, resulting in cultural changes. In order to reconcile modern techniques with traditional practices, social psychologists in India are in the process of "indigenizing psychology". Indigenous psychology is that which is derived from the laws, theories, principals, and ideas of a culture and unique to each society.

In multiple Asian countries, childbirth is still treated by traditional means and is thought of with regional attitudes. For example, in Pakistan, decisions concerning pregnancy and antenatal care (ANC) are usually made by older women, often the pregnant woman's mother-in-law, while the mother and father to be are distanced from the process. They may or may not receive professional ANC depending on their education, class, and financial situation. Generally in Asia, childbirth is still a woman's area and male obstetricians are rare. Female midwives and healers are still the norm in most places. Western methods are overtaking the traditional in an attempt to improve maternal health and increase the number of live births.

Asian countries, which are mostly developing nations, are aging rapidly even as they are attempting to build their economies. Even wealthy Asian nations, such as Japan, Singapore, and Taiwan, also have very elderly populations and thus have to try to sustain their economies and society with small younger generations while caring for their elderly citizens. The elderly have been traditionally well respected and well cared for in most Asian cultures; experts predict that younger generations in the future are less likely to be concerned and involved in the health care of their older relatives due to various factors such as women joining the workforce more, the separation of families because of urbanization or migration, and the proliferation of Western ideals such as individualism.

=== Australia ===
The health patterns found on the continent of Australia which includes the Pacific Islands, have been influenced by European colonization. While indigenous medicinal beliefs are not significantly prevalent in Australia, traditional ideas are still influential in the health care problems in a number of the islands of the Pacific. The rapid urbanization of Australia led to epidemics of typhoid fever and the Bubonic plague. Because of this, public health was professionalized beginning in the late 1870s in an effort to control these and other diseases. Since then Australia's health system has evolved similarly to Western countries and the main cultural influence affecting health care are the political ideologies of the parties in control of the government.

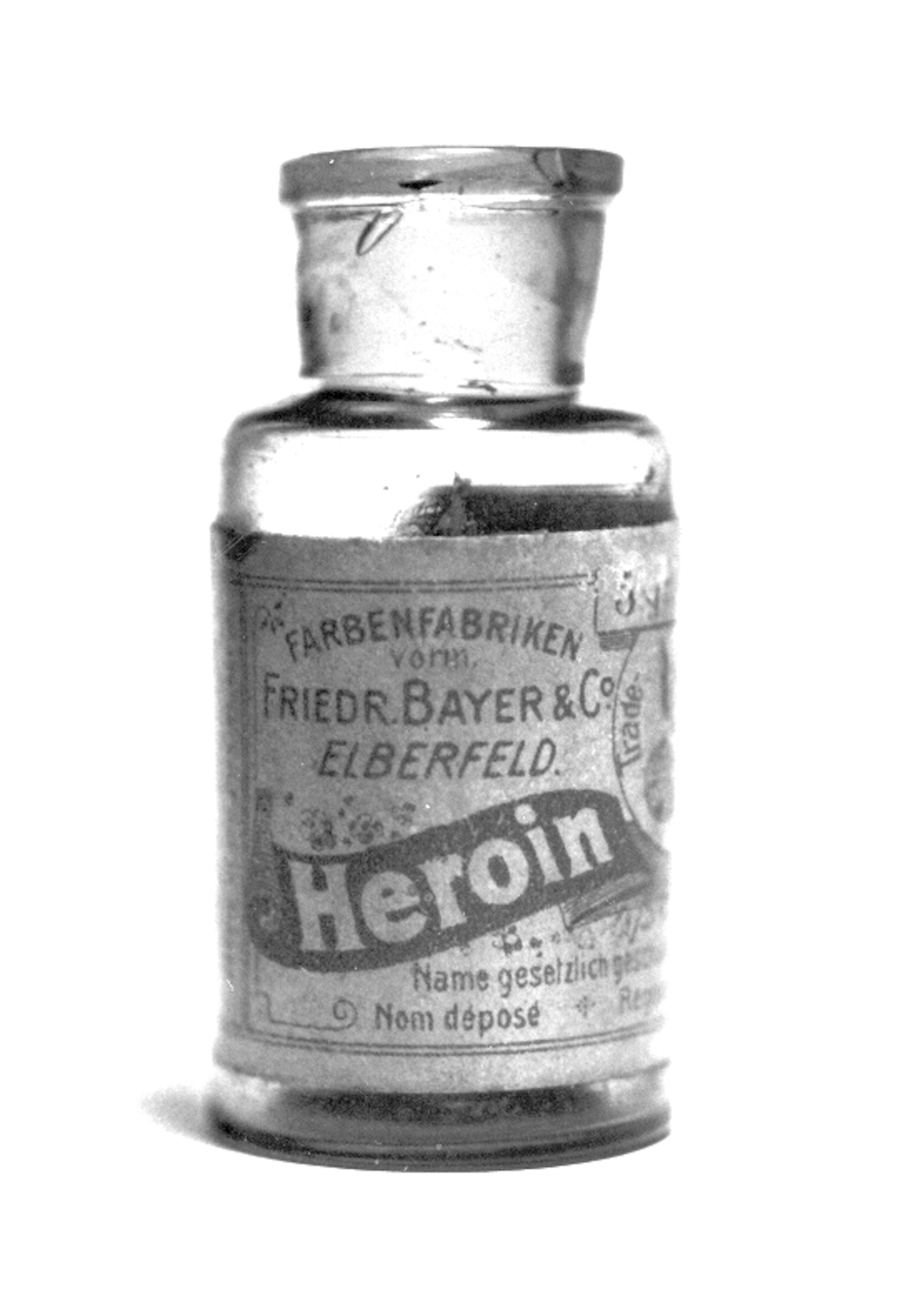
Old heroin bottle

Australia has had treatment facilities for 'problem drinkers' since the 1870s. In the 1960s and 1970s it was recognized that Australia had several hundred thousand alcoholics and prevention became a priority over cures, as there was a societal consensus that treatments are generally ineffective. The government began passing laws attempting to curb alcohol consumption but consistently met opposition from the wine-making regions of southern Australia. The government has also waged a war on illegal drugs, particularly heroin, which in the 1950s became widely used as a pain reliever.

Experts believe that a number of the health problems in the Pacific Islands can be traced back to European colonization and the subsequent globalization and modernization of island communities. (See History of the Pacific Islands.) European colonization and late independence meant modernization but also slow economic growth, which had an enormous effect on health care, particularly on nutrition in the Pacific Islands. The end of colonization meant a loss of medical resources, and the fledgling independent governments could not afford to continue the health policies put in place by the colonial governments. Nutrition was changed radically, contributing to various other health problems. While more prosperous, urban areas could afford food, they chose poor diets, causing 'overnourishment', and leading to extremely high levels of obesity, type 2 diabetes, and cardiovascular diseases. Poorer rural communities, on the other hand, continue to suffer from malnutrition and malaria.

Traditional diets in the Pacific are low in fat, but since World War II there has been a significant increase in fat and protein in Pacific diets. Native attitudes towards weight contribute to the obesity problem. Tongan natives see obesity as a positive thing, especially in men. They also believe that women should do as little physical work as possible while the men provide for them, meaning they get little exercise.

=== Europe ===
The largest endeavors to improve health across Europe is the World Health Organization European Region. The goal is to improve the health of poor and disadvantaged populations by promoting healthy lifestyles including environmental, economic, social and providing health care. Overall health in Europe is high compared to the rest of the world. The average life expectancy is around 78 in EU countries but there is a wide gap between Western and Eastern Europe. It is as low as 67 in Russia and 73 in the Balkan states. Europe is seeing an increase in the spread of HIV/AIDS in Eastern Europe because of a worsening socioeconomic situation. Cardiovascular disease, cancer and diabetes mellitus are more prevalent is Eastern Europe. The WHO claims that poverty is the most important factor bringing on ill health across Europe. Those at low socioeconomic status levels and multiple young people are also at risk because of their increased tobacco, alcohol, and non-medical substance use. Health and illness prevention in Europe is largely funded by the governmental services including: regulating health care, insurance and social programs. The role of religion and traditional medicine, however, is often left unexamined in such reports.

The study of hypertension within the United Kingdom has turned to examining the role that beliefs play in its diagnosis and treatment. Hypertension is an essential topic for study since it is linked to increased risk of stroke and coronary heart disease. The most common treatment for hypertension is medication but compliance for this treatment plan is low. A study conducted in the UK examined the differences between 'white' patients and first generation immigrants from the West Indies. There were differing reasons for non-compliance that involve the patients' perception and beliefs about the diagnosis. Patients commonly believe that high levels of anxiety when first diagnosed are the major cause and think that when stress levels decline so too will their hypertension. Other respondents in this UK based study had varying beliefs concerning the necessity of medication while others still argued that it was the side effects of medication that made them end their prescribed regimen. West Indian respondents whose lay culture teaches them to reject long-term drug therapy opted instead for folk remedies in higher numbers than the 'white' respondents. What can be seen here is that some people will choose to ignore a doctor's expert advice and will employ 'lay consultation' instead.

Regions of the WHO

Before people seek medical help they try to interpret the symptoms themselves and often consult people in their lives or use 'self-help' measures. A study of 'everyday illness' in Finland including: influenza, infections and musculo-skeletal problems focused on reasons for consulting medical experts and explanations of illness. These common illness were examined not because of their seriousness but because of their frequency. The researchers explain five possible triggers that people seek medical aid: 1- the occurrence of an interpersonal crisis 2- perceived interference with social and personal relations 3- perceived interference with vocational & physical activity 4- sanctioning by other people 5- patients' ideas about how long certain complaints should last. These kind of explanatory models are part of the process that people use to construct medical culture. They give meaning to illness and health, answer questions about personal responsibility about health and most importantly are part of the dialogue between patients' and professionals' illness explanations. It can help explore why some patients will follow a doctors instructions to the letter and others ignore them completely. A patient's explanation or understanding of their illness can be much broader than a physician's and this dynamic has become a major criticism of modern medical practice since it normally excludes the "social, psychological and experiential dimensions of illness."

The Finnish study examined 127 patients and the results have been different from findings in other countries where there is more 'lay consultation'. Half of the respondents did not have any lay consultation before coming to the doctors office. One-third did not try any self-treatment and three-quarters of the sample consulted the doctor within three days of symptoms developing. Possible explanations are that in Finland there is an aspect "over-protectiveness" within their health care system. Some might conclude that the Finnish people are dependent and helpless but the researchers of this study found that people chose to consult professionals because they trusted them over some lay explanation. These results echo similar studies in Ireland that explain this phenomenon as being based in a strong work ethic. Illness in these countries will affect their work and Finnish people will quickly get treatment so they can return to work. This research out of Finland also describes that this relationship between patient and doctor is based on:

1. national and municipal administrative bureaucracies that demand more output and more satisfied patients
2. the public demanding better care
3. nurses criticizing physicians for not taking a holistic view of patients
4. hospital specialists wanting better/earlier screening for serious illnesses (e.g. cancer).

The conflict between medical and lay worlds is prominent. On one hand a number of patients believe they are the expert of their own body and view the Doctor-patient relationship as authoritarian. These people will often use knowledge outside the medical field to deal with health and illness. Others see the doctor as the expert and are shy about describing their symptoms and therefore rely on the doctor for diagnosis and treatment.

In Europe, sociology of health and illness is represented by the European Society of Health and Medical Sociology (ESHMS).

=== North America ===
Compares figures in the population of OECD countries and the percentage of total population (aged 15 and above) with a body mass index greater than 30. Data was collected between 1996 and 2003.

North America is a fairly recent settled continent, made up of the United States, Canada, Mexico, Central America, and the Caribbean. It was built by an amalgamation of wealth, ideas, culture, and practices. North America is highly advanced intellectually, technologically, and traditionally. This advantageous character of North American nations has caused a high average life expectancy of 75 years for males and 80 years for females. This leads to the conclusion that North America has cultivated a comparatively healthy society. As North America contains several core nations, the growing economies in those nations are able to maintain and develop medical institutions. This subsequently provides more access to health care for American citizens but health care is not universal. North America is known for being a leading nation in regards to industrialization and modernization, but the United States lacks federal laws regarding health care as a basic human right. This lag of health care security causes subsequent issues with pharmaceutical competition, lack of care for the elderly, and little attention to alternative medicine. Health care and education are plentiful at a price and illness still persists for multiple reasons. A main reason is that a lower- and middle-class population still exists in plentiful numbers, maintaining a group that is highly vulnerable to physical ailment.

World map showing alcohol consumption around the world

North America's primary risk factors for illness are currently excessive alcohol use, malnutrition, obesity, tobacco use, and water sanitation. Obesity is a recent epidemic in North America. The 1990s brought a rise in the average Body Mass Index, or BMI. From the beginning and to the end of the decade, the median percent of adults who were obese rose from 12% to 20%. Alcoholism is the addiction of over-consumption of alcohol and is highly prevalent in the US. There are high incidence rates in multiple other world regions. Roughly 61% of American adults drank in 2007, and 21% of current drinkers consumed five or more drinks at one point in the last year. There have also been 22,073 alcohol induced deaths in the United States in the past year, about 13,000 of which were related to liver disease. Alcoholism has a number of risk factors ingrained in North American culture, such as heredity, stress from competition or availability.

The Swine Flu (also known as H1N1) epidemic is a recent disease emerging in the early 21st century. In April 2009, during the early days of the outbreak, a molecular biologist named Dr. Henry Miller wrote in the Wall Street Journal about New York City high-school students. These students apparently brought the virus back from Mexico and infected their classmates. All six cases so far reported in Canada were connected directly or indirectly with travel to Mexico as well. Flu viruses can be directly transmitted (via droplets from sneezing or coughing) from pigs to people, and vice versa. These cross-species infections occur most commonly when people are close to large numbers of pigs, such as in barns, livestock exhibits at fairs, and slaughterhouses. The flu is transmissible from human to human, either directly or via contaminated surfaces."

=== South America ===
There are a number of diseases that affect South America, but two major conditions are malaria and Hepatitis D. Malaria affects every country in South America except Uruguay, Chile, and The Falkland Islands. Elevation is a major factor in the areas where malaria is found. The disease is spread from person to person via mosquito bites. People are typically bitten by mosquitoes at dusk and dawn. Symptoms of this disorder are: high fever, chills, sweating, headaches, body aches, weakness, vomiting and diarrhea. If left untreated, new symptoms can occur; people that are infected may experience seizures, delirium and coma. Severe cases may end in death. Malaria can be cured, but the symptoms may not become noticeable until months later. There are three forms of medication that can cure Malaria. An infected person's accessibility to these drugs is dependent upon their access to medical care and their financial situation. Literature about Malaria treatment typically is focused toward people who are tourists. Most sources are not written with the native in mind.

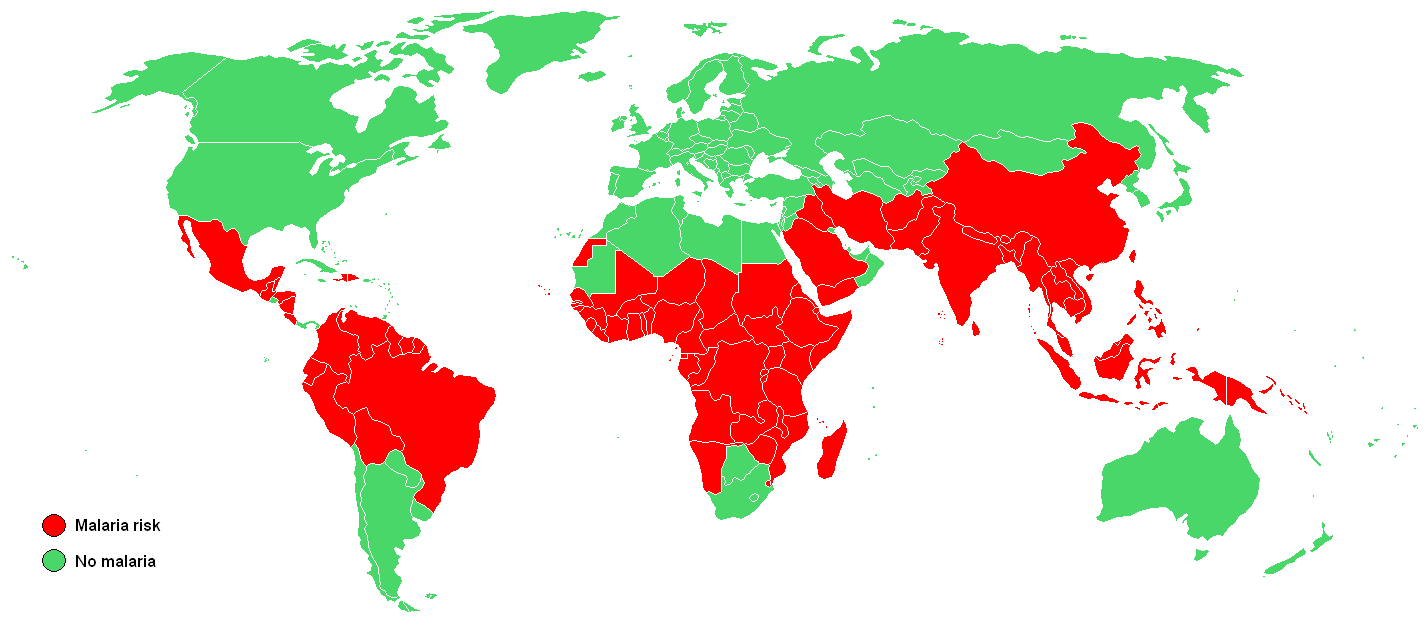
Malaria

The first sign of Hepatitis D was detected in 1978 when a strange and unrecognizable internuclear antigen was discovered during a liver biopsy of several Italians who developed HBV infections. Scientists initially thought that it was an antigenic specificity of HBV, but they soon found that it was a protein from another disease altogether. They called it "Hepatitis Delta Virus" (HDV). This new virus was found to be defective. HDV needed HBV to act as a helper function in order for it to be detected. Normally Hepatitis B is transmitted through blood or any type of blood product. In South America Hepatitis D was found to be fatal. Scientists are still unsure in what way this disease was being transmitted throughout certain South American countries. Sexual contact and drug use are the most common means of transmission. HDV is still considered an unusual form of hepatitis. Agents of this virus resemble that of plant viroids. It is still hard to tell how many stereotypes exist because HDV is under the umbrella of HBV. HDV causes high titers in the blood of people who are infected. Incubation of Hepatitis D typically lasts for thirty five days. Most often Hepatitis D is a co-infection with Hepatitis B or a super-infection with chronic hepatitis. In terms of super infections there are high mortality rates, ranging seventy to eighty percent; in contrast with co-infections which have a one to three percent mortality rate. There is little information with the ecology of Hepatitis D. Epidemics have been found in Venezuela, Peru, Columbia, and Brazil. People who are treated for Hepatitis B have been able to control Hepatitis D. People who have chronic HDB will continue to get HDV.

Another disease that affects South America is HIV and AIDS. In 2008 roughly two million people had HIV and AIDS. By the end of 2008 one hundred and seventy thousand people were infected with AIDS and HIV. Seventy seven thousand people died from this disease by the end of that year. Brazil has the most people that are affected with AIDS and HIV in South America. In Brazil sixty percent of the inhabitants are HIV positive because of drug use. Usually this disease is transmitted by either drug use involving needles or unprotected sex. Sharing needles and being infected with HIV and AIDS is most common in Paraguay and Uruguay. South America is trying to get treatment to the thousands of people infected by this disease. Brazil is offering generic AIDS prescriptions that are much less expensive than the name brand drugs. One hundred and eighty-one thousand inhabitants in Brazil who were infected are being treated. That accounts for eighty percent of those who needed immediate help. This aid from the government has had positive results. Statistics show that there was a fifty percent decrease in mortality rates, approximately sixty to eighty percent decrease in morbidity rates and a seventy percent decrease in hospitalization of infected people.

In remote areas of South America, traditional healers are the only forms of health care people have. In north Aymara and south Mapuche, where the indigenous groups have the strongest voices, they still heavily use traditional medicine. The government in Chile has implemented an Indigenous Health System to help strengthen the health care system. Even with Chile's indigenous groups, Chile still has the best public health services in South America. They also have the lowest mortality rates in the area. Their health care policies are centered around family and community wellbeing by focusing on the strategies for prevention health strategies. Reports have shown an increase in mental health issues, diabetes, and cardiovascular diseases.

South America's economy is developing rapidly and has a great deal of industries. The major industry in South America are agriculture. Other industries are fishing, handicrafts, and natural resources. Its trade and import-export market is continually thriving. In the past South American countries moved slowly in regards to economic development. South America began to build its economy ever since World War II. South America's largest economies are Brazil, Chile, Argentina, and Columbia. Venezuela, Peru, and Argentina's economy are growing rapidly.

== Journals ==
- Sociology of Health and Illness
- Social Science and Medicine
- Health: An Interdisciplinary Journal for the Social Study of Health
- Illness and Medicine
- Social Theory and Health
- Health, Risk and Society

== See also ==
- Alternative medicine
- Medicalization
- Epidemiology
- Naturalistic disease theories
- European Society of Health and Medical Sociology
