= Understanding Baby Loss =

2023 book by Kate Reed, Julie Ellis and Elspeth Whitby

Understanding Baby Loss: The sociology of life, death and post-mortem
- Authors: Kate Reed, Julie Ellis and Elspeth Whitby
- Language: English
- Publisher: Manchester University Press
- Publication date: 2023
- Publication place: United Kingdom
- Media type: Print
- Pages: 248
- Awards: Foundation for the Sociology of Health & Illness' Book of the Year Prize (2024)
- ISBN: 9781526191564

Understanding Baby Loss: The sociology of life, death and post-mortem is a 2023 book by Kate Reed, Julie Ellis and Elspeth Whitby, published by Manchester University Press. The book is a qualitative study of baby loss, based in the UK, and engages with the perspectives of parents, grandparents, and health professionals. The book was awarded the Foundation for the Sociology of Health & Illness' Book Prize in 2024.

== Reception ==
In a review for Sociology of Health & Illness, Jung Chen wrote that the book "enriches multiple fields, including studies of reproductive loss, medical sociology and relational sociology". Jean St. Clair, in a review for CHOICE: Current Reviews for Academic Libraries, wrote that the book's "themes are thought provoking and encourage health professionals to reflect on their role during the loss of a baby".

=== Awards ===
- Foundation for the Sociology of Health & Illness' Book Prize (2024).
