= European Society of Health and Medical Sociology =

- Abbreviation: ESHMS
- Formation: 1983
- Type: Academic Society
- Region served: Europe
- Members: ~300 members in 2024
- Website: https://eshms.eu

The European Society of Health and Medical Sociology (ESHMS) is a non-profit and independent society dedicated to advancing the sub-disciplines of health sociology and medical sociology. It was founded on 28–29 August 1983 at the University of Stirling, United Kingdom. Magdalena Sokołowska was the first president of the society and Raymond Illsley the first secretary.

ESHMS is composed of scientists involved in health and medical sociology research, health policy, health promotion and social epidemiology.

The society is registered in Germany and its official language is English.

== Founding and history ==
The ESHMS was founded by Magdalena Sokolowska, Raymond Illsley, Ivo Nuyens, Per-Gunnar Svensson and Johannes Siegrist, among others, in response to the growing interest in sociological perspectives on health and medicine in Europe, including Israel.

The WHO played a key role in the creation of the society. Following the 1978 Alma-Ata conference, the 34th World Health Assembly adopted the "Global strategy health for all by the year 2000". This initiative aimed to achieve an acceptable level of health "for all" individuals, enabling them "to lead a socially and economically productive life". The WHO European Office encouraged European sociologists to set up the European Society of Medical Sociology, which was founded in 1983.

The society has since grown to include members from diverse academic backgrounds and countries, and serves as a forum for discussing health issues, synthetising knowledge and experiences across European countries, and creating opportunities for research and international cooperation. Key milestones in the society's development include the launch of its biennial conference and its collaborations with other international associations.

== Activities ==
The ESHMS supports various activities, including:

- Organising the European biennial conference of health and medical sociology
- Organising workshops and summer schools.
- Promoting publications in the field of sociology of health and medicine.
- Supporting early-career researchers
- Facilitating collaborative research projects
- Providing networking opportunities for members.
- Funding research visits through dedicated grants.
- Awarding the best contribution in health and medical sociology with the "Excellence Prize".

== Biennial Conferences ==
The ESHMS organises a biennial conference that serves as a major platform for researchers and practitioners to present their work, exchange ideas, and network. Each conference is hosted by a different academic institution in Europe, focusing on a theme relevant to current health and medical sociology issues.

=== List of Biennial Conferences ===
Year	No	Theme	Location	Date	Host Institution
1986	1st	[Theme of First Conference]	Groningen, The Netherlands	3 June	University of Groningen
1988	2nd	[Theme of Second Conference]	Zagreb, Croatia	25 September	[Institution]
1990	3rd	[Theme of Third Conference]	Marburg, Germany	September	[Institution]
1992	4th	Health in Europe: diversity, integration and change	Edinburgh, United Kingdom	18–21 September	University of Edinburgh, Joint conference with the British Sociological Association Medical sociology group
1994	5th	Health + Medicine in the New Europe	Vienna, Austria	16–18 September	Ludwig Boltzmann Gesellschaft for The Sociology of Health and Medicine, University of Vienna
1996	6th	Health + Social Change in the Integration of Europe	Budapest, Hungary	29–31 August	[Institution]
1998	7th	The Making of Health Policy in Europe	Rennes, France	27–29 August	Ecole nationale de santé publique
2000	8th	Health in Transition: European Perspectives	York, United Kingdom	14–17 September	University of York, Joint conference with the British Sociological Association Medical sociology group
2002	9th	Health and Society in Europe	Groningen, The Netherlands	28–31 August	University of Groningen
2004	10th	European perspectives on changing health systems	Bologna, Italia	2–4 September	University of Bologna, Joint conference with the Italian Society of Health Sociology
2006	11th	European Health: Old and new challenges-Tackling Health Inequalities	Krakow, Poland	31 Aug-2 September	[Institution]
2008	12th	Health and Wealth in East and West – Divergence and Convergence in Europe	Oslo, Norway	28–30 August	Oslo University College
2010	13th	Health and Well-Being in Radically Changing Societies	Ghent, Belgium	26-28 Aug	Ghent University
2012	14th	Health inequalities over the life course	Hannover, Germany	30 Aug – 1 September	Hannover Medical School
2014	15th	Health and Welfare Challenges in Europe: East, West, North and South	Helsinki, Finland	28–30 August	Finnish National Institute for Health and Welfare
2016	16th	Healthy lives: technologies, policies and experiences	Geneva, Switzerland	27–29 June	University of Geneva
2018	17th	Old tensions, emerging paradoxes in health: rights, knowledge, and trust	Lisbon, Portugal	6–8 June	School of Sociology and Public Policies ISCTE-University Institute of Lisbon
2020	18th	Imagining beyond crisis: health, society, medicine (Cancelled because of COVID-19)	Uppsala, Sweden	27-29 Aug	Uppsala University
2022	19th	Healthscapes. Shaping the future of the post-pandemic society	Forlì, Italy	25-27 Aug	University of Bologna
2024	20th	Intersectionality & Inclusion in Health	Antwerp, Belgium	3–5 July	University of Antwerp
2026	21st	Mental Health in Times of Uncertainty	Hamburg, Germany	19–21 August	University Medical Center Hamburg-Eppendorf
2028	22nd	Towards a caring Europe: people, relations and systems	Krakow, Poland	5-7 July	Jagiellonian University Medical College

== Health and Medical Sociology Excellence Prize ==
This prize aims to honour and recognize outstanding contributions in the field of health and medical sociology through the acknowledgment of the best paper published in a peer-reviewed journal over the past four years. The prize was launched in 2024.

=== List of Health and Medical Sociology Excellence Prizes ===
Prize year	Author	Article title	DOI
2024	Ariane Bertogg	Gendered life courses and cognitive functioning in later life: the role of context-specific gender norms and lifetime employment	https://doi.org/10.1007/s10433-023-00751-4
2028	Forthcoming	The Prize will be delivered during the 22nd ESHMS conference, 5-7 Juy 2028, Krakow	Forthcoming

== Membership ==
Membership in the ESHMS is open to academics, researchers, and professionals interested in the sociology of health, medical sociology, or more broadly the links between society and health.

== Governance ==
The bodies of the ESHMS are the Executive Committee, the Advisory Board, and the General Assembly.

The ESHMS is governed by an elected Advisory Board comprising academics and professionals from diverse European institutions. Within the Advisory Board, the Executive Committee is composed of the President, Vice-President and the Treasurer. The board oversees the society's activities, including the organisation of conferences and member engagement. Members of the Advisory Board are elected by the members of the ESHMS for a term of office of four years.

The General Assembly serves as the main meeting of the society. This meeting takes place every two years at the biennial conference.

=== Past and Current Executive Committees ===
Below, the list of previous Executive Committees.

Year	President	Vice-President	Treasurer	Secretary	Election Period (Term)
1983	Magdalena Sokolowska	(unknown)	(unknown)	Raymond Illsley	(Do not apply – first election in 1987)
1984	Magdalena Sokolowska	(unknown)	(unknown)	(unknown)	(Do not apply – first election in 1987)
1985	Magdalena Sokolowska	(unknown)	(unknown)	(unknown)	(Do not apply – first election in 1987)
1986	Judith T. Shuval	(unknown)	(unknown)	(unknown)	(Do not apply – first election in 1987)
1987	Judith T. Shuval	(unknown)	(unknown)	(unknown)	1987-1990
1988	Judith T. Shuval	(unknown)	(unknown)	(unknown)	1987-1990
1989	Magdalena Sokolowska	(unknown)	(unknown)	(unknown)	1987-1990
1990	Johannes Siegrist	(unknown)	(unknown)	(unknown)	1987-1990
1991	Johannes Siegrist	(unknown)	(unknown)	(unknown)	1991-1994
1992	Johannes Siegrist	(unknown)	(unknown)	(unknown)	1991-1994
1993	Wim van den Heuvel	(unknown)	(unknown)	(unknown)	1991-1994
1994	Wim van den Heuvel	(unknown)	(unknown)	(unknown)	1991-1994
1995	Wim van den Heuvel	(unknown)	(unknown)	(unknown)	1995-1998
1996	Jürgen Pelikan	Eva Orozs	Johan De Ruiter	Johan De Ruiter	1995-1998
1997	Jürgen Pelikan	Eva Orozs	Johan De Ruiter	Johan De Ruiter	1995-1998
1998	Jürgen Pelikan	Eva Orozs	Johan De Ruiter	Johan De Ruiter	1995-1998
1999	Hilary Thomas	Denny Vågerö	(unknown)	Catherine Déchamp-Le Roux	1999-2002
2000	Hilary Thomas	Denny Vågerö	(unknown)	Catherine Déchamp-Le Roux	1999-2002
2001	Hilary Thomas	Denny Vågerö	(unknown)	Catherine Déchamp-Le Roux	1999-2002
2002	Hilary Thomas	Denny Vågerö	(unknown)	Catherine Déchamp-Le Roux	1999-2002
2003	Siegfried Geyer	Denny Vågerö	(unknown)	Johan De Ruiter	2003-2006
2004	Siegfried Geyer	Denny Vågerö	Rosaline Barbour	Rosaline Barbour	2003-2006
2005	Siegfried Geyer	Denny Vågerö	Rosaline Barbour	Rosaline Barbour	2003-2006
2006	Siegfried Geyer	Denny Vågerö	(unknown)	(unknown)	2003-2006
2007	Guido Giarelli	Denny Vågerö	Michèle Baumann	Michèle Baumann	2007-2010
2008	Guido Giarelli	Beata Tobiasz-Adamczyk	Michèle Baumann	Michèle Baumann	2007-2010
2009	Guido Giarelli	Ofra Anson	Michèle Baumann	Michèle Baumann	2007-2010
2010	Guido Giarelli	Ofra Anson	Michèle Baumann	Michèle Baumann	2007-2010
2011	Piet Bracke	Ofra Anson	Terje A. Eikemo	(no longer a role)	2011-2014
2012	Piet Bracke	Ofra Anson	Terje A. Eikemo	(no longer a role)	2011-2014
2013	Piet Bracke	Ofra Anson	Terje A. Eikemo	(no longer a role)	2011-2014
2014	Piet Bracke	Ofra Anson	Terje A. Eikemo	(no longer a role)	2011-2014
2015	Sakari Karvonen	Terje A. Eikemo	Ellen Verbakel	(no longer a role)	2015-2018
2016	Sakari Karvonen	Terje A. Eikemo	Ellen Verbakel	(no longer a role)	2015-2018
2017	Sakari Karvonen	Olaf von dem Knesebeck	Ellen Verbakel	(no longer a role)	2015-2018
2018	Sakari Karvonen	Olaf von dem Knesebeck	Ellen Verbakel	(no longer a role)	2015-2018
2019	Stéphane Cullati	Zofia Slonska	Ellen Verbakel	(no longer a role)	2019-2022
2020	Stéphane Cullati	Zofia Slonska	Ellen Verbakel	(no longer a role)	2019-2022
2021	Stéphane Cullati	Zofia Slonska	Ellen Verbakel	(no longer a role)	2019-2022
2022	Stéphane Cullati	Zofia Slonska	Ellen Verbakel	(no longer a role)	2019-2022
2023	Stéphane Cullati	Sarah van de Velde	Małgorzata Mikucka	(no longer a role)	2023-2026
2024	Stéphane Cullati	Sarah van de Velde	Małgorzata Mikucka	(no longer a role)	2023-2026
2025	Stéphane Cullati	Sarah van de Velde	Małgorzata Mikucka	(no longer a role)	2023-2026
2026	Stéphane Cullati	Sarah van de Velde	Małgorzata Mikucka	(no longer a role)	2023-2026
2027	Alice Scavarda	Melissa Ceuterick	Małgorzata Mikucka	(no longer a role)	2027-2030
2028	Alice Scavarda	Melissa Ceuterick	Małgorzata Mikucka	(no longer a role)	2027-2030
2029	Alice Scavarda	Melissa Ceuterick	Małgorzata Mikucka	(no longer a role)	2027-2030
2030	Alice Scavarda	Melissa Ceuterick	Małgorzata Mikucka	(no longer a role)	2027-2030

Commons Categories	Wiktionary
	Wiktionary:Sociology; Wiktionary:Epidemiology; Wiktionary:Public health
