= More Than Medicine =

2020 book by LaTonya J. Trotter

More Than Medicine: Nurse Practitioners and the Problems They Solve for Patients, Health Care Organizations, and the State
- Authors: LaTonya J. Trotter
- Language: English
- Subjects: Sociology
- Publisher: Cornell University Press
- Publication date: 2020
- Publication place: United States
- Media type: Print (hardcover, Paperback)
- Pages: 216
- Awards: Foundation for the Sociology of Health & Illness' Book of the Year Prize (2022)
- ISBN: 978-1501748141

More Than Medicine: Nurse Practitioners and the Problems They Solve for Patients, Health Care Organizations, and the State is a 2020 book by the sociologist LaTonya J. Trotter, published by Cornell University Press. The book is a multiyear ethnographic study of the everyday work of nurse practitioners (NPs) set in a nursing school and an adult day center for nursing home level-of-care patients. The book won the Foundation for the Sociology of Health & Illness' Book Prize in 2022.

== Reception ==
Tania M. Jenkins, writing in the American Journal of Sociology, identified Trotter's main argument as concerning "her proposed concept of "clinic work"" which is used to "describe the unique combination of medical and care work done" by nurse practitioners. Jenkins suggests that Trotter sees nurse practitioners' openness to a range of tasks as "diametrically opposed to physicians" and "driven by organizational, professional, and state demands". Jenkins praised Trotter for her "rich prose and her exceptional ability to weave intricate stories into a compelling, nuanced portrait of 21st-century health care". In a critical comment, Jenkins wrote that "there were some areas that could have been bolstered by additional evidence" to support Trotter's findings. Jenkins summarised that More Than Medicine "helps both to fill an important gap as one of the first ethnographies of NPs and to open new lines of inquiry for future research".

Jo Hope, in a review for Sociology of Health & Illness, saw the book as "persuasively arguing how the micro conditions of the clinic and the often locally contested role of the NP reflect wider social, governmental, professional, historical, economic and organisational constraints". Hope wrote that Trotter's "central thesis" in the book is that "the NP is primarily a nursing rather than a para-physician role". Hope praised the book as a "wide-ranging and engaging ethnography" and an "enjoyable read for anybody interested in ethnographies of work and health care". Hope concluded that the book is "a significant contribution to the sociological literature on nursing".

=== Awards ===
- Foundation for the Sociology of Health & Illness' Book Prize (2022).
