= Biopsychosocial model =

Explanatory model emphasizing the interplay among causal forces

The biopsychosocial model of health

Biopsychosocial models (BPSM) are a class of trans-disciplinary models which look at the interconnection between biology, psychology, and socio-environmental factors. These models examine how such factors interact to play a role in a range of topics, but mainly psychiatry, health and human development. Biopsychosocial approaches have significant overlaps and connections to emergent theories such as the social determinants of health, and models which seek to explain disease by reference to intergenerational, economic, and environmental factors.

The term is generally used to describe a model advocated by George L. Engel in 1977. The model built upon the foundational idea that "illness and health are the result of an interaction between biological, psychological, and social factors". The initial idea behind the model was to express mental distress as a triggered response of a disease that a person is genetically vulnerable to when stressful life events occur. In that sense, it is also known as vulnerability-stress model.

It then became referred to as a generalized model that interpreted similar aspects, and became an alternative to the biomedical and/or psychological models then dominant in many health care systems.

By around 2017, BPSM had become generally accepted; research interest—and use of the models in healthcare policy and by active medical professionals—continued to grow over the decade to 2020.

== Current status ==
A 2023 review said that in the previous decades substantial evidence had arisen supporting BPSM, although the theory of it remained unclear.

A 2021 review found a substantial gap between healthcare professionals' knowledge of the BPSM and their adoption of it in clinical practice.

A 2020 review presented the 'BPS-Pathways model,' which describes the pathways through which biopsychosocial factors are interconnected.

A 2018 review found that BPSM in primary care could lead to improved clinical outcomes, through creating awareness of factors impacting health and enhancing self-management of patients' illnesses.

A 2007 review said that the biopsychosocial model was widely accepted as the most heuristic approach to understanding and treating chronic pain.

A 2004 review said the BPSM was widely used as both a philosophy of clinical care and a practical clinical guide useful for broadening the scope of a clinician's gaze. It proposed the model had evolved into a biopsychosocial and relationship-centered framework for physicians. It proposed three clarifications to the model, and identified seven established principles.

- Self-awareness.
- Active cultivation of trust.
- An emotional style characterized by empathic curiosity.
- Self-calibration as a way to reduce bias.
- Educating the emotions to assist with diagnosis and forming therapeutic relationships.
- Using informed intuition.
- Communicating clinical evidence to foster dialogue, not just the mechanical application of protocol.

A 2002 review proposed use of the BPSM because the biomedical model did not fit the social and psychological aspects of health problems.

=== Institutional recognition ===
In the decade to 2015 there was a rising interest among healthcare researchers and practicing medical professionals in the biopsychosocial model. However, despite the rising interest, medical schools had limited use of the model in their curriculums relative to the increasing literature about the model.

== Biopsychosocial model vs. biomedical model ==
The biopsychosocial and biomedical models offer distinct perspectives on understanding and addressing health and illness.

=== Biomedical model ===
The biomedical model, which was historically prevalent, takes a reductionist approach by focusing on biological factors and treating diseases through medical interventions. It sees diseases as isolated physical abnormalities.

While this approach was once deemed sufficient, research within psychology and the social sciences cast doubt on its effectiveness.

=== Biopsychosocial model ===
The biopsychosocial model adopts a holistic viewpoint, acknowledging the complex interplay of biological, psychological, and social factors in shaping health and illness. It sees diseases as outcomes of dynamic interactions among various dimensions. The model emphasizes the interconnectedness of these dimensions, recognizing their mutual influence on an individual's health.

The BPSM has been extended to consider additional holistic elements influencing the perceived necessity for healthcare and the focus on health-related matters: Information, Beliefs, and Conduct. Based on the model's dependence on perception, it has been considered imperative to actively engage the individuals or communities whose requirements are being addressed, regardless of whether the focus is on their health, education, employment, housing, or any other needs. A key term in the biopsychosocial model is "syndemic" which refers to a set of health problem factors that interact synergistically with each other ranging from socioeconomic status to genetics.

Treatment under the biopsychosocial model is comprehensive, involving medical, psychological, and social interventions to address overall well-being.

== In relation to patient populations ==
Health inequities, often rooted in social determinants of health, highlight the disparities in health outcomes experienced by different populations.

The BPSM provides a framework for comprehending how health disparities arise and persist, which makes it a model of interest in targeting health inequities.

Some patients that fall under the biopsychosocial model may not fall under the biomedical model, as the biopsychosocial model considers factors that may not physiologically manifest in a person. These patients include those affected by health inequities and those at risk of infirmity.

== In relation to prevention ==
Preventative medicine considers preventative measures to stop patients from obtaining infirmity in the first place. By combatting preventable chronic diseases which make up a majority of deaths in patients of the US, the BPSM has been considered a potential tool to improve patient outcomes. SAMHSA has promoted BPSM approaches in preventing opioid use.

== In relation to gender ==
Within the framework of the biopsychosocial model, gender is regarded by some as a complex and nuanced construct, shaped by the intricate interplay of social, psychological, and biological factors. This perspective, as echoed by the Gender Spectrum Organization, defines gender as the multifaceted interrelationship between three key dimensions: body, identity, and social gender.

In essence, this characterization aligns with the fundamental principles of the biopsychosocial model, emphasizing the need to consider not only biological determinants but also the profound influences of psychological and social contexts on the formation of gender.

According to the insights of Alex Iantaffi and Meg-John Barker, the biopsychosocial model provides a comprehensive framework to understand the complexities of gender. They illustrate that biological, psychological, and social factors are not isolated entities but rather intricately intertwined elements that continually interact and shape one another. In this dynamic process, a person's gender identity emerges as the result of a complex interplay between their biological characteristics, psychological experiences, and social interactions. This holistic perspective is in harmony with the biopsychosocial model's approach, which acknowledges the inseparable connection between these various dimensions in influencing an individual's overall well-being.

In essence, within the biopsychosocial paradigm, gender is not merely a product of biological determinants; rather, it is a dynamic and interconnected aspect of human identity. This perspective urges a more nuanced understanding, encouraging researchers and medical professionals to consider the intricate interplay of social, psychological, and biological factors when exploring and addressing the complexities of gender.

== Models, theories and theorists ==
The following models or theories are regarded as biopsychosocial;

- Engel's model, as above.
- The Dynamic-Maturational Model of Attachment and Adaptation (DMM) describes how attachment relationships, and other factors, effect human development, information processing and functioning. Crittenden considered this to be a biopsychosocial model.
- Kozlowska's Functional Somatic Symptoms approach sees attachment relationships and other factors as causes of somatic problems. Siegel's Interpersonal Neurobiology (IPNB) model is similar to Kozlowska's approach, but sees the individual brain and mind, and interpersonal relationships, as part of one reality, rather than separate elements.
- Some trauma informed care models are biopsychosocial models.
- In 2012 Lumley and colleagues used a non-Engel model to conduct a biopsychosocial assessment of the relationship between pain and emotion.
- In 1986 Zucker and Gomberg used a non-Engel biopsychosocial perspective to assess the etiology of alcoholism.

== Potential applications ==
=== Understanding of medical effects ===
When Engel first proposed the biopsychosocial model it was for the purpose of better understanding health and illness. While this application still holds true the model is relevant to topics such as health, medicine, and development. Firstly, as proposed by Engel, it helps physicians better understand their whole patient. Considering not only physiological and medical aspects but also psychological and sociological well-being. Furthermore, this model is closely tied to health psychology. Health psychology examines the reciprocal influences of biology, psychology, behavioral, and social factors on health and illness.

=== Primary care ===
BPSM can improve primary care clinical outcomes, through creating awareness on the interactions among biological, psychological, sociocultural, and spiritual factors, and enhancing self-management of patients' illnesses.

=== Chronic and ill-defined conditions ===
BPSM is useful to address chronic diseases and ill-defined illnesses to which patients mount unique responses.

=== Pain ===
BPSM can be applied in relation to pain. Several factors outside an individual's health may affect their perception of pain. For example, a 2019 study linked genetic and biopsychosocial factors to increased post-operative shoulder pain. Future studies are needed to model and further explore the relationship between biopsychosocial factors and pain.

=== Mental health and psychology ===
Correlation has been found between adverse childhood experiences and subsequent health and well-being outcomes.

A BPSM appraisal can be used in diagnosis of depression and anxiety.

One advantage of applying the biopsychosocial model to developmental psychology is that it allows for an intersection within the nature versus nurture debate. This model provides developmental psychologists a theoretical basis for the interplay of both hereditary and psychosocial factors on an individual's development.

=== Care ===
The BPSM approach has been used as a framework for or component of care.

== Biopsychosocial research ==
Wickrama and colleagues have conducted several biopsychosocial-based studies examining marital dynamics. In a longitudinal study of women divorced midlife they found that divorce contributed to an adverse biopsychosocial process for the women. In another study of enduring marriages, they looked to see if hostile marital interactions in the early middle years could wear down couples regulator systems through greater psychological distress, more health-risk behaviors, and a higher body mass index (BMI). Their findings confirmed negative outcomes and increased vulnerability to later physical health problems for both husbands and wives.

Kovacs and colleagues meta-study examined the biopsychosocial experiences of adults with congenital heart disease. Zhang and colleagues used a biopsychosocial approach to examine parents own physiological response when facing children's negative emotions, and how it related to parents' ability to engage in sensitive and supportive behaviors. They found parents' physiological regulatory functioning was an important factor in shaping parenting behaviors directed toward children's emotions.

A biopsychosocial approach was used to assess race and ethnic differences in aging and to develop the Michigan Cognitive Aging Project. Banerjee and colleagues used a biopsychosocial narrative to describe the dual pandemic of suicide and COVID-19.

A biopsychosocial approach is also used to explain elusive factors in higher mortality rate known as the 'Glasgow effect'.

Despite its theoretical robustness and growing empirical support, the implementation of this model in clinical practice remains inconsistent, hindered by systemic, professional, and cultural barriers.

Artificial intelligence-driven tools are also being explored to integrate biopsychosocial data into clinical decision-making, enabling personalized treatment plans that reflect the complexity of each patient's condition.

== Criticisms ==
There have been a number of criticisms of Engel's biopsychosocial model.

Benning summarized the arguments against the model including that it

- lacked philosophical coherence,
- was insensitive to patients' subjective experience,
- was unfaithful to the general systems theory that Engel claimed it be rooted in,
- engendered an undisciplined eclecticism that provided no safeguards against either the dominance or the under-representation of any one of the three domains of bio, psycho, or social.

Psychiatrist Hamid Tavakoli argued that Engel's biopsychosocial model should be avoided because it

- unintentionally promoted an artificial distinction between biology and psychology, and
- caused confusion in psychiatric assessments and training programs,
- ultimately it has not helped the cause of trying to de-stigmatize mental health. The perspectives model does not make that arbitrary distinction.

A number of these criticisms have been addressed. For example, the biopsychosocial pathways model describes how it is possible to conceptually separate, define, and measure biological, psychological, and social factors, and thereby seek detailed interrelationships among these factors.

In a series of articles, Hunt, St-John Smith and Abed further criticised the biopsychosocial model for its lack of interaction with evolutionary theory, proposing that integrating evolutionary theory could address many of its criticisms. This 'evobiopsychosocial' approach is suggested to offer clarity on the relationship between the biological, psychological and social levels, and grounds the model more explicitly in fundamental biological theory, with implications for research, treatment, and conciliation.

As of 2017 whilst Engel's call to arms for a biopsychosocial model had been taken up in several healthcare fields and developed in related models, it had not been adopted in acute medical and surgical domains. In psychiatric settings, the biopsychosocial model has been operationalized through measurement-based care frameworks, which systematically assess biological (medication response, genetics), psychological (symptom scales, therapy progress), and social (functioning, life stressors) dimensions at each clinical encounter.

== History ==
The biopsychosocial model (BPSM) was proposed in the late 20th century.

The idea that there are several factors that may contribute to one's mental suffering is not a new concept.

Urie Bronfenbrenner wrote extensively on social and environmental influences on human development.

Adolf Meyer's psychobiology model is considered the forerunner to the biopsychosocial model by many. Meyer emphasised understanding mental illness in the context of a patient's personal history over diagnostic categories. Meyer laid down the groundwork for understanding the interplay of psychology and biology but tended to view these as interacting domains rather than a unified framework. Engel's model later incorporated biological, psychological, and social factors within a single conceptual approach.

The WHO definition of health adopted in 1948 implied a broad socio-medical perspective.

Roy Grinker coined the term 'biopsychosocial' prior to Engel's work. However, Grinker emphasized biological aspects of mental illness rather than proposing an integrative model of general health.

Engel broadened medical thinking by challenging the dominance of the biomedical approach. The idea of mind–body dualism goes back at least to René Descartes. Engel emphasized that the biomedical approach is limited because biological factors alone do not account for illness. Instead, psychological and social factors play a significant role in how illness is experienced and treated. Engel proposed a dialogue between the patient and the doctor in order to find the most effective treatment solution.

George L. Engel and John Romano of the University of Rochester in 1977 are widely credited with proposing the biopsychosocial model. Engel struggled with the then-prevailing biomedical approach to medicine as he strove for a more holistic approach by recognizing that each patient has their own thoughts, feelings, and history.

=== Emergence within the context of psychiatry ===
The biopsychosocial model is not just one of many competing explanations of health. Its emergence is best understood within a historical context. The model's development in psychiatry was influenced by ongoing debates about the scientific foundations of the discipline.

By the 20th century, psychiatry was still a relatively new field. In the Victorian era, psychiatry faced challenges in establishing medical authority over mental illness. This position was challenged by the problem of shell shock after World War I, which exposed limitations of purely biological explanations and contributed to the recognition of neurosis and the acceptance of psychoanalysis in psychiatric discourse. Institutions such as the Tavistock Clinic played a role in promoting psychosomatic approaches. These developments provided a context in which the biopsychosocial model gained influence.

=== WHO adoption in 2002 ===
After publication, principles consistent with the biopsychosocial model were reflected in the World Health Organization's International Classification of Functioning, Disability and Health in 2001–2002.
