= Daniel J. Siegel =

Psychiatry professor and executive director of the Mindsight Institute

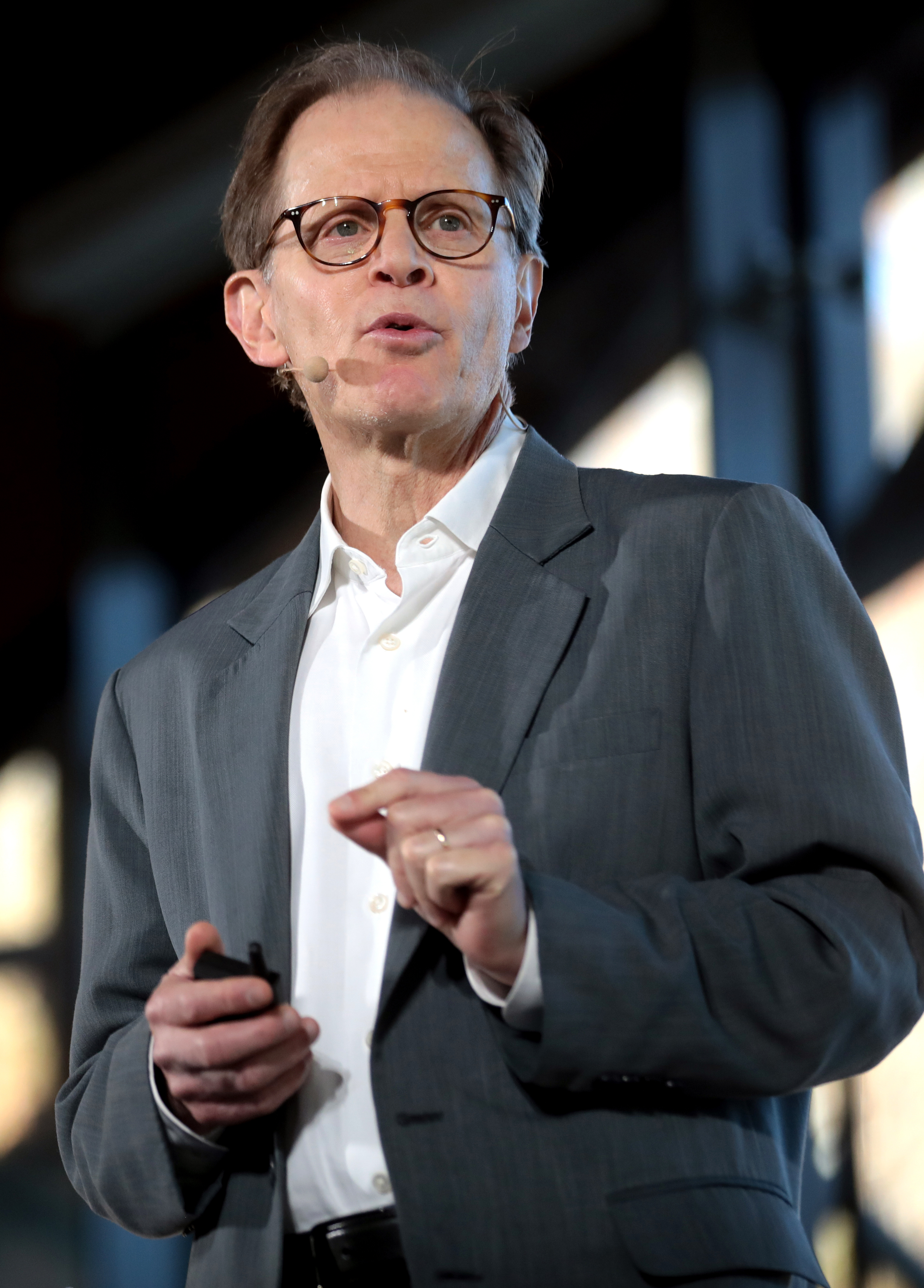
- Born: 2 September, 1957
- Education: Harvard Medical School; UCLA
- Occupations: Psychiatrist, author

Daniel J. Siegel (born July 17, 1957) is a clinical professor of psychiatry at the UCLA School of Medicine and executive director of the Mindsight Institute.

== Background ==
Daniel J. Siegel received his medical degree from Harvard Medical School and completed his postgraduate medical education at UCLA with training in pediatrics and child, adolescent and adult psychiatry. He also served as a post-doctoral fellow in the Bjork Learning and Forgetting Lab and Cogfog at UCLA. He served as a National Institute of Mental Health Research Fellow at UCLA, studying family interactions with an emphasis on how attachment experiences influence emotions, behavior, autobiographical memory and narrative.

Siegel is a clinical professor of psychiatry at the UCLA School of Medicine and the founding co-director of the Mindful Awareness Research Center at UCLA. An educator, he is a Distinguished Fellow of the American Psychiatric Association and recipient of several honorary fellowships. Siegel is also the executive director of the Mindsight Institute, an educational organization, which offers online learning and in-person seminars that focus on how the development of mindsight in individuals, families and communities can be enhanced by examining the interface of human relationships and basic biological processes. His psychotherapy practice includes children, adolescents, adults, couples, and families. He serves as the medical director of the LifeSpan Learning Institute and on the advisory board of the Blue School in New York City, which has built its curriculum around Siegel's Mindsight approach. Siegel is also on the Board of Trustees at the Garrison Institute.

Siegel has published extensively for the professional audience. He is the author of numerous articles, chapters, and the text, The Developing Mind: How Relationships and the Brain Interact to Shape Who We Are (2012). This book introduces the field of interpersonal neurobiology, and has been utilized by a number of clinical and research organizations worldwide. Siegel serves as the Founding Editor for the Norton Professional Series on Interpersonal Neurobiology which contains over sixty textbooks. The Mindful Brain: Reflection and Attunement in the Cultivation of Well-Being (2007) explores the nature of mindful awareness as a process that harnesses the social circuitry of the brain as it promotes mental, physical, and relational health. The Mindful Therapist: A Clinician's Guide to Mindsight and Neural Integration (2010), explores the application of focusing techniques for the clinician's own development, as well as their clients' development of mindsight and neural integration. Pocket Guide to Interpersonal Neurobiology: An Integrative Handbook of the Mind (2012), explores how to apply the interpersonal neurobiology approach to developing a healthy mind, an integrated brain, and empathic relationships. Mind: A Journey to the Heart of Being Human (2016) offers a deep exploration of our mental lives as they emerge from the body and our relations to each other and the world around us. His book Aware: The Science and Practice of Presence (2018) provides practical instruction for mastering the Wheel of Awareness, a tool for cultivating more focus, presence, and peace in one's day-to-day life. Siegel's publications for professionals and the public have been translated into over 40 languages.

Siegel's book, Mindsight: The New Science of Personal Transformation (2010), offers the general reader an in-depth exploration of the power of the mind to integrate the brain and promote well-being. He has written five parenting books, including Brainstorm: The Power and Purpose of the Teenage Brain (2014); The Whole-Brain Child: 12 Revolutionary Strategies to Nurture Your Child's Developing Brain and No-Drama Discipline: The Whole-Brain Way to Calm the Chaos and Nurture Your Child's Developing Mind, both with Tina Payne Bryson, PhD., The Yes Brain: How to Cultivate Courage, Curiosity, and Resilience in Your Child (2018) also with Tina Payne Bryson, PhD., and Parenting from the Inside Out: How a Deeper Self-Understanding Can Help You Raise Children Who Thrive (2003) with Mary Hartzell, M.Ed.

Siegel is involved in mindfulness and developed the field of Interpersonal Neurobiology, which is an interdisciplinary view of life experience that draws on over a dozen branches of science to create a framework for understanding of our subjective and interpersonal lives.

Siegel's most recent work integrates the theories of Interpersonal Neurobiology with the theories of Mindfulness Practice and proposes that mindfulness practice is a highly developed process of both inter and intra personal attunement.

He used to counsel comedian Chelsea Handler.

== Publications ==
- The Developing Mind: Toward a Neurobiology of Interpersonal Experience (New York: Guilford Press, 1999)
- Healing Trauma: Attachment, Mind, Body and Brain (New York: WW Norton & Company, 2003). Co-edited with Marion Solomon.
- Parenting From the Inside Out: How A Deeper Self-Understanding Can Help You Raise Children Who Thrive (New York: Tarcher, 2004). Co-author with Mary Hartzell.
- The Mindful Brain: Reflection and Attunement in the Cultivation of Well-Being (New York: WW Norton & Company, 2007)
- The Healing Power of Emotion: Affective Neuroscience, Development & Clinical Practice (New York: WW Norton & Company, 2009). Co-edited with Diana Fosha and Marion F. Solomon.
- The Mindful Therapist: A Clinician's Guide to Mindsight and Neural Integration (New York: WW Norton & Company, 2010)
- Mindsight: The New Science of Personal Transformation (New York: Bantam, 2010)
- The Whole-Brain Child: 12 Revolutionary Strategies to Nurture Your Child’s Developing Mind, Survive Everyday Parenting Struggles, and Help Your Family Thrive (New York: Delacorte Press, 2011). Co-author with Tina Payne Bryson.
- The Developing Mind, Second Edition: How Relationships and the Brain Interact to Shape Who We Are (New York: Guilford Press, 2012). ISBN 978-1-4625-0390-2.
- Pocket Guide to Interpersonal Neurobiology: An Integrative Handbook of the Mind (New York: W.W. Norton & Company, 2012)
- Brainstorm: The Power and Purpose of the Teenage Brain (New York: Penguin Putnam, 2013)
- No-Drama Discipline: The Whole-Brain Way to Calm the Chaos and Nurture Your Child's Developing Mind (New York: Bantam, 2014). Co-author with Tina Payne Bryson.
- Mind: A Journey to the Heart of Being Human (New York: WW Norton & Company, 2016)
- The Yes Brain: How to Cultivate Courage, Curiosity, and Resilience in Your Child (New York: Bantam, 2018). Co-author with Tina Payne Bryson.
- Aware: The Science and Practice of Presence (New York: TarcherPerigee, 2018).
- The Developing Mind, Third Edition: How Relationships and the Brain Interact to Shape Who We Are (New York: Guilford Press, 2020).
