= Naturalistic disease theories =

Theories within a culture which explain diseases and illnesses in impersonal terms

In medical anthropology, naturalistic disease theories are those theories, present within a culture, which explain diseases and illnesses in impersonal terms. George Foster explains naturalistic disease theory as following an "equilibrium model" in which health results from ideal balances of well-being appropriate to one's age, condition, and environment. Imbalances in these systems result in illness through impersonal and systematic mechanisms. One example of a naturalistic disease theory is the theory expressed in western medicine or biomedicine, which links disease and illness to scientific causes. This leaves any personal liability for the disease out of the equation, and the diseases are attributed to organisms such as bacteria or viruses, accidents, or toxic substances.

Other cultures have developed different naturalistic disease theories. One specific example lies in Latin cultures, which place "hot" or "cold" classifications on things like food, drink, and environmental conditions. They believe that the combination of hot and cold substances will cause an unbalanced system that leads to disease. Therefore, one is expected not to have a cold drink after taking a hot bath. Other examples of naturalistic disease theory include biomedicine and vitalism. Illnesses not considered to be caused by naturalistic disease theories fall under the category of personalistic disease theory. This theory views illness as a result of a personal direct agent such as a supernatural force, witchcraft, or the evil eye.

== Context ==
=== Medical anthropology ===
Naturalistic and personalistic disease theories have been defined by medical anthropologists who study health and healing systems in their social and cultural contexts across the world in both prehistoric and contemporary populations. Medical anthropology studies health, illness, and healing using anthropological theories and methods to learn more about factors that influence health and illness distribution, how people experience, prevent, and treat illness, their healing processes and the social relationships, cultural importance, and utilization of medical systems. Most subdivisions of anthropology primarily study humankind and its relationships, so medical anthropology largely analyzes how the health of individuals, communities, and the environment are affected by relationships, social norms, politics, and globalization. However, medical anthropology must also study the biological implications of health, because culture and biology affect health and wellbeing in tandem. This results in medical anthropologists discussing health in terms of illness and disease, where illness is the experience and perceptions of sickness largely influenced by social factors, and disease is the clinical manifestation of that sickness as altered physical function. Medical anthropologists created the two categories of naturalistic and personalistic theories of health, illness, and disease based on these approaches to studying systems of health.

== Types of naturalistic disease theories ==
=== Biomedicine ===
Biomedicine often refers to the Western conventional medical model which asserts that illness is the result of deviations from perceived biological norms. The biomedical model is founded upon the naturalistic theories about the body; within this approach illnesses are believed to arise from a specific and identifiable agent. As practiced in the United States, biomedicine defines health as the absence of disease, notably excluding the impact that social and/or spiritual well-being has on health. So, while individuals that subscribe to biomedicine might evoke help from supernatural beings, for example through prayer, the supernatural being evoked is not recognized as the agent of disease, thus distinguishing supernatural presence from its association within personalistic disease theory.

An important underlying assumption to consider is that biomedicine views illness, medical theories, science, and practical applications as culturally and universally legitimate, and also assumes that physical bodies are biologically identical globally. Moreover, biomedicine was seen to be acultural, while medical models elsewhere were seen to be culturally dependent and lacking scientific relevance; hereby delegitimizing other medical models and considering the experience of illness as unaffected by local context.

One of the foundational theories of biomedicine is The Germ Theory of Disease. According to germ theory, infectious diseases are caused by the presence of pathogenic microorganisms present within the physical body. Previously, disease was thought to be caused by miasma, or bad air, and while microorganisms had been discovered, they were not known to cause disease. Towards the end of the 19th century, germ theory helped transform medical thought and the art of surgical practices. In effect, germ theory revolutionized peoples' lives in order to abide by modern sanitation regulations. It influenced how people cleaned their homes, how people produced and prepared their foods, and how people interacted with one another. Additionally, given that germ theory allowed for the naming of specific pathological entities, the biomedical model started to view diseases as universal categories with particular etiologies. In effect, medical attention became focused on specific pathogens and pathologies instead of focusing on the individual and the social & natural environment.

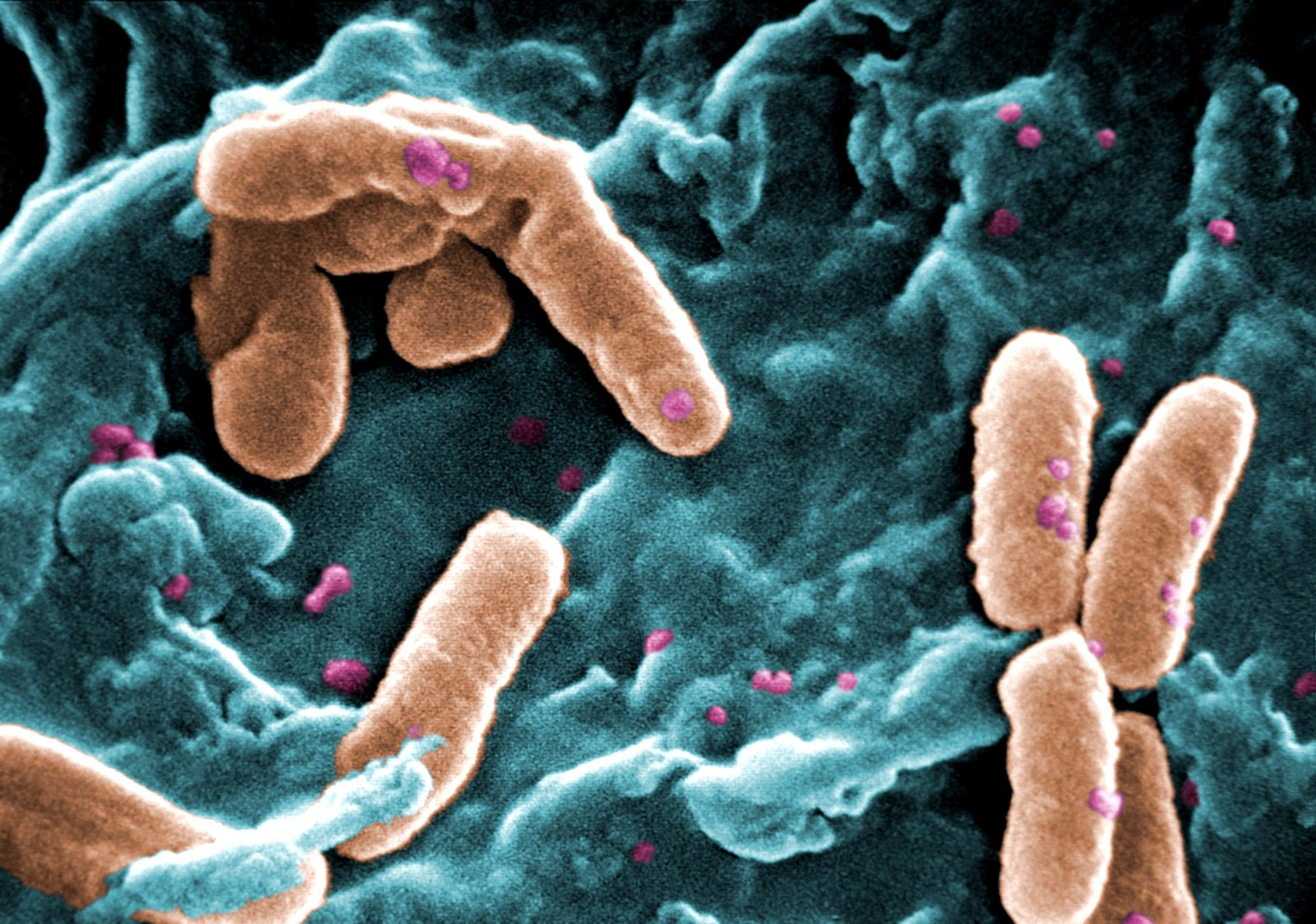
Electron microscope photo of bacteria in accordance with germ theory

Before the emergence of germ theory and biomedicine, hygienic practices were often formed around religious concepts of ritual purity. Germ theory generated a whole new set of ritualistic behaviors seeking to prevent the invasion of germs that has since become standardized, practical, secular, rational, and scientific. Treatment in biomedicine typically involves an individual going to a professional with a causational idea of the source of illness and asking for treatment that will restore wellbeing and biological equilibrium.

=== Vitalism ===
Vitalism is based on the belief that natural forces in the body define an individual's health. If these forces are harmonious, then the body is healthy, but if they are disrupted, they cause illness and disease until their normal flow is restored. Some examples of these vitalist forces are the 5 humors, Qi and prana, Ayurveda, and yin and yang.

Humorism is a medical approach relying on a balance of the four elements: blood, phlegm, yellow bile, and black bile, as well as with the lifestyle and environment. The balance of these bodily elements, which correspond to the physical elements of earth, air, fire, and water, can vary with the seasons, diet, exercise, and other external factors. Like other vitalist theories, imbalance causes disease. Humorism treatment involves restoring the balance, and thus health, by removing the element that was in excess. While humorism has since been disproved as a theory of medicine, it remains important as the first medical approach to consider natural causes of disease, rather than supernatural.

The 4 elements of Humorism as they relate to physical elements and their qualities

Other medicinal systems link vitality to energy, such as Qi in China and prana in India, and consider the human body to be a small aspect of a much larger universe that is connected via energy and spirit. Traditional Chinese medicine utilizes qigong, or the practice of maintaining Qi (or Chi, both pronounced Chee) as a vital life energy that supports health through a union of body, breath, and mind. Illness occurs when there is a disruption of Qi to body organs and systems, either as a result of excess or lack of Qi, while health occurs when Qi is balanced and sufficient. There are two types of Qi: nonrenewable Qi, also called prenatal or original, and renewable Qi which can be obtained through food, air, nature, meditation, etc. Qi circulates in the body through meridians forming acupuncture points that can be stimulated to influence organ function and even epigenetics. Stimulating these points has been found to have clinical significance in improving asthma, allergies, nausea, pain, stress and anxiety, and kidney and liver function.

Similarly, pranayama is the Indian practice of attaining and cultivating prana. In India, the vital life energy that supports healing when balanced and causes disease when imbalanced is called prana. Like Qi, it utilizes the body and mind to supply vital energy to organs through channels called chakras, much like meridians in qigong.

The idea of a vital energy such as Qi and prana have been adopted in Korean, Japanese, Greek-Islamic and Tibetan medicines as well. These medical ideas may be spread through cultures via state delegations, medicinal herb traders, spiritual pilgrims, or inherent healers that travel between communities.

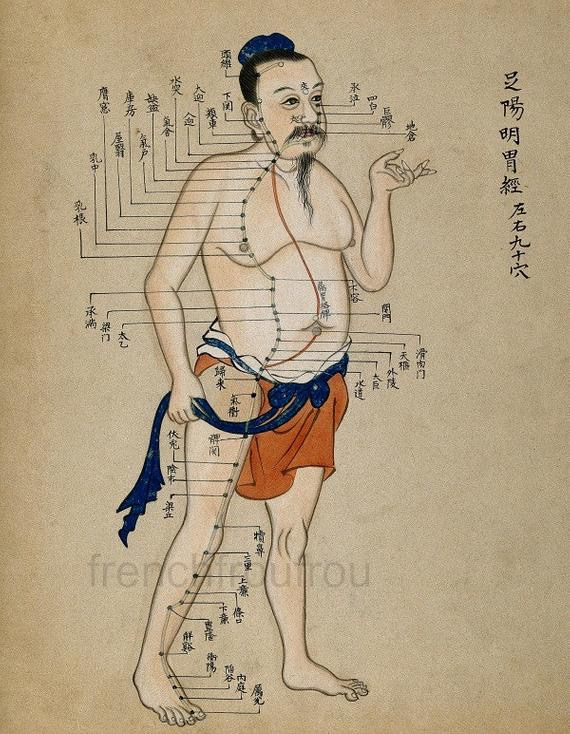
Ancient Chinese acupuncture diagram as used in the Chinese practice of Qi

Ayurveda is another ancient Indian medical system that attributes illness to an imbalance or stress in consciousness. It relies on a natural and holistic approach to physical and mental health in which universal connectedness, prakriti, or the body's constitution, and doshas, or life forces, are the primary aspects. It uses products from plants, minerals, and animals among others, as well as diet, exercise, and lifestyle to regain balance between mind, body, spirit, and environment. Ayurvedic medicine attempts to eliminate impurities, minimize symptoms, increase resistance to disease and worry, and improve harmony in life through a cleansing process, diet, exercise, meditation, and other holistic practices. However, only a few clinical trials have been done to test the efficacy of Ayurveda in western countries and because its effects are unverified in the US, many Ayurvedic medicines are sold as supplements rather than drugs.

== Cultural implications ==
=== Perceptions ===
Illness causality, and the corresponding theories of naturalistic versus personalistic medicine, closely relates to cures, diagnosis, disease prevention used within a wider social and cultural context. During the formative years of medical anthropology, minimal discourse occurred between anthropologists studying non-Western medicine, which led to many non-biomedical practices being labelled as primitive. Contrarily, naturalistic systems of disease theory tie back to practices and explanations popularized in ancient classical civilizations, like Greece (humorism), Rome (humorism & microbial theory), India (Ayurveda and prana), and China (Qi). Modern perceptions, particularly in Western thought tend to delineate biomedicine as being modern in origin while vitalism seems to be a remnant of the past. Current institutionalized systems of training and development for all naturalistic medicine point to naturalistic universal position in modernity.

=== Disease vs. illness ===
Whether viewed through a naturalistic or personalistic lens, disease is considered to be pathological, tangible, or organic manifestations of "sickness" or "imbalance" while perceived illnesses are often culturally bound. Illness is a person's perceptions or embodied experiences of disease and are often varied based upon a person's understanding of illness in a biomedical, vital, or spiritual context. Although disease may be universally experienced, culturally-bound syndromes interpret manifesting illness in the context of their psycho-social setting. Notably, Dhat syndrome is viewed in Southeast Asia as a physical manifestation of anxiety following sexual impotence. The physical manifestation is universally experienced as impotence across the globe, but Dhat syndrome is culturally perceived as resulting from an imbalance in vital fluid considered in humoristic theory.

Despite by definition being based in biological causation and free of objective moral and ethical value, naturalistic theories of disease carry inherent cultural implications. For example, what one culture or country might classify as a disease caused from internal imbalances might be considered normal behavior within a different culture. Additionally, even within a given culture, time plays a role in defining disease caused by natural forces and imbalances. For example, as recently as the 20th century homosexuality was considered a biologically determined disease by the American Psychiatric Association and World Health Organization based on social rather than pathological premises.

=== Modern applications ===
Worldwide, 1,900 medical schools in 166 countries train biomedical professionals and many more Osteopathic training institutions found internationally. These allopathic medical training programs are generally formally structured with overarching regulatory institutions.

Despite sometimes lacking formally recognized training institutions, naturalistic medicine carries large cultural authority in nations across the world. In Nigeria alone, 80% of citizens receive reliable healthcare only through such traditional healers, meaning these practitioners have deep ties to the culture and health of local communities. The World Health Organization called upon African governments to formally recognize traditional medicine practices within local cultures. Traditional medical providers were considered to have immense potential in allowing the UN to reach its Sustainable Development Goals. By granting official status and authority to these naturalistic, non-biomedical practices, the WHO aimed to further increase access to and funding of locally accepted health providers.

Non-biomedical naturalistic practices have also increased in prevalence amongst wealthy populations across the world. Rich Westerners, some frustrated with biomedical treatment, are known to seek out alternative treatment such as Qi in China. This "experimentation" with various naturalistic treatment theories has become commodified in some such circles to become a notable fraction of local economies. Socio-cultural and economic importance of naturalistic medical practices validate these practices in global circles outside of "traditional" spheres of practice. This is seen with up to 70% of Canadians reporting having used "alternative" medicines outside of the biomedical categorization.

== Limitations of terminology and alternate categorization ==
The binary terminology system of disease causality— naturalistic or personalistic—is limited in its assumption that every culture binds itself to one particular theory. However, many cultures acknowledge personalistic casualties as well naturalistic casualties, especially in instances of emotional disturbances and illnesses. One instance in which these lines blur is exemplified in the Latin American emotional disturbance known as susto, or "fright". In this case, if fright can be traced back to an agent that intended harm, it might be classified in terms of personalistic causation. However, if the fright results from a chance occurrence that might lead to natural harm, for example slipping on a rock near a body of water and fearing drowning, it aligns more with naturalistic causation. An additional discrepancy in the dual terminology is that while naturalistic theories can only address illness, personalistic theories might be applied to misfortunes with far more variable causality, not purely the biological.

Linda Garro in her studies of medical anthropology and illness theories found that comparative frameworks of these theories are not top down and deterministic, but rather they are a useful aid in addressing ambiguity in illness in a cross cultural context. As medical anthropology became a realm of interest, varying theories of illness accompanied and led to the development of the naturalistic and personalistic categorizations. Anthropologist George Murdock in 1980 proposed two categories of disease theory: natural causation being disease explained by "modern medical science", and supernatural causations, consisting of mystical, magical, and animistic sources of disease. Another popular categorization of the time classified disease as internalizing, referring to reliance on physiological explanations, as exemplified through biomedicine, compared to externalizing, referring to illness attributed to disrupted, external relations.
