= Interpersonal neurobiology =

Interdisciplinary framework associated with human development and functioning

Interpersonal neurobiology (IPNB) or relational neurobiology is an interdisciplinary framework that was developed in the 1990s by Daniel J. Siegel, who sought to bring together scientific disciplines to demonstrate how the mind, brain, and relationships integrate. IPNB views the mind as a process that regulates the flow of energy and information through its neurocircuitry, which is then shared and regulated between people through engagement, connection, and communication. Drawing on systems theory, Siegel proposed that these processes within interpersonal relationships can shape nervous system maturation. Siegel claimed that the mind has an irreducible quality which informs this approach.

IPNB proposes that interpersonal experiences have substantial impact on brain development early in life. Siegel notes that disruptions to the continuity, presence, and availability of the caregiver result in attachment disorders that manifest as physical changes in neural structures that shape the perception of reality. The claim is that this influences emotional intelligence, complexity of behaviours, and flexibility of responses later in life. IPNB asserts a causal interaction between genetic composition and social experiences influencing neurobiological and psychological functioning.

== History ==
At the University of California Siegel gathered academics from fields including anthropology, physics, neuroscience, sociology, linguistics, genetics, and psychiatry. At this meeting, he argued that contemporary understanding of the 'mind' and the effect of social relationships on brain development/functioning was underdeveloped.

The term mind lacks a rigorous definition. The oldest and still common reference is to Hippocrates text On the Sacred Disease which refers to the mind as 'brain activity'. This definition has been rejected by sociologists, linguists, and anthropologists who argued that interpersonal relationships should be part of the definition. This position is controversial, and neuroscientists and physicians have ridiculed this view, instead asserting that our thoughts and feelings, and therefore our mind, are an outcome of brain activity. This is the standard view in line with William James' 1890 text Principles of Psychology. Siegel counters that because developmental studies of child attachment relationships demonstrated that severed child relationships with parents could impede growth, sometimes even causing death, as first described in Sigmund Freud's 1927 text The Question of Lay Analysis, a more expansive view was warranted.

Over the next four and half years Siegel and similar-minded colleagues began to construct the framework of interpersonal neurobiology.

Other academics who have contributed to the concept of IPNB are Alan Schore, Louis Cozolino, and Bonnie Badenoch.

== Aspects ==
IPNB offers the Brain-Mind-Relationship or Triangle of Well-being concept to explain how social interactions shape neural connections. The biological and social interactions create continuous feedback loops, effected via neuroplasticity.

=== Brain/body ===
The brain and body are intimately connected. The body holds multiple clusters of neurons. E.g., the human gut has approximately 100,000,000 neurons. Stephen Porges' polyvagal theory claims that the vagus nerve system is central to connecting these clusters.

Siegel's model of the brain attempts to simplify the complexity of brain formation in emphasizing interaction between the brainstem, limbic systems (hippocampus and amygdala) and middle prefrontal cortex.

Close proximity between the Limbic System (Hippocampus & Amygdala) and Brainstem

- Brainstem: A major role of the brainstem involves regulation. This mediation of the autonomic nervous system (including the sympathetic and parasympathetic nervous systems) controls our homeostasis of heart rate, breathing, hunger, and rest, as well as our fight/flight/freeze/faint responses to perceived threats and other stimuli.
- Hippocampus: The hippocampus is associated with explicit and declarative memory and begins development at approximately 18 months of age.
- Amygdala: The amygdala primarily processes memories, emotions, and decisions. It mediates fear, rapidly absorbing and analysing information faster than the conscious mind to potentially trigger a fight or flight response through the brain stem.
- Prefrontal cortex: Within the prefrontal cortex is the middle prefrontal region, including the orbitofrontal cortex, medial frontal gyrus and ventrolateral prefrontal cortex. These areas are responsible for abstract ideas/thoughts, reasoning/thinking, and planning ahead. The area has been linked to regulation of the autonomic nervous system, social cognition, morality, and self-awareness.

Due to the close proximity of the middle-prefrontal cortex, the brainstem, and limbic systems, Siegel argued that the integration of these areas via the prefrontal cortex that controlled nine essential neurobiological and interpersonal functions, including:

- Body regulation
- Attuned communication
- Emotional balance
- Response flexibility
- Fear modulation
- Empathy
- Insight
- Moral awareness
- Intuition

=== Mind ===
In IPNB, the mind is the embodied and relational process that regulates the flow of energy and information both within and between brains. IPNB decomposes the term mind into four facets:

- Subjective experience - one's respective perception and felt texture of life
- Consciousness - the experience of knowing or being aware, and the knowledge or that awareness
- Information processing - collecting, storing, using, and producing information.
- Self-organisation - when the parts of a complex system differentiate and then link without external control. A failure of self-organisation leaves a chaotic or inflexible outcome.

=== Relationships ===
In epigenetics, psychological development can occur through interchange between heredity and environment, with the surrounding culture and environment influencing personality development. IPNB elevates epigenesis, claiming that neurons from variant experiences/relationships can alter regulatory molecules that control gene expression, thus shaping the activity and structure of neural circuits. Relationships associated with negative affect experiences cause related neurons to develop thicker axons and more dendrites, which allow affect behaviour faster and more intensely than information coming from the prefrontal cortex. Neural clusters associated with positive affect are evidently not as influential in the brain, to the extent that they are less salient for survival. Negative experiences form stronger neural connections between the amygdala, and brainstem, which are reinforced through mental repetition and attentional bias. Such experiences shape neural connections, from which the mind emerges.

=== Integration ===
Siegel refers to integration as the process of linking parts into a functional whole. In IPNB, integration comes from the energy and information flow between relationships and the brain. Interpersonal relationships early in life shape neural structures that allow a coherent world view. Relationships thereby facilitate or inhibit the integration of a holistic, coherent experience. Using a MEG, connectome harmonics reveals how the brain recruits differentiated regions into a harmonious whole. Impaired integration, potentially though poor infant-caregiver relationships, may stimulate 'chaotic' or 'rigid' patterns of behaviour, possibly explaining why development is 'stunted' in such individuals.

==== Domains ====
Siegel identified nine domains of integration imperative for brain health:

- Consciousness – differentiating the knowing from the knowns of what we are aware of
- Bilateral – left and right hemispheres
- Vertical – linking the brainstem and limbic area to higher cortical regions
- Memory – linking the elements of implicit memory to explicit memory.
- Narrative – making sense of memory and experience to establish meaning in events
- State – respecting the states of mind that make up memory, thought, behaviour, and action
- Interpersonal – respecting others' inner experiences and engaging in respectful communication
- Temporal – representing time/change and reflect on the passage of time (e.g. life versus death).
- Identity – the sense of agency and coherence (potentially associated with feelings of belonging)

== Impact on attachment and development ==
IPNB examines how integrative experiences promote or prune the growth of integrative brain fibres. At birth, an infant's brain occupies approximately 25% the volume of an adults brain in its first year and 75% in its second year. This development is affected by the environment, as the subcortical areas in the brain undergo rapid growth in the first 6 months. Mirror neurons promote this development, as they fire both when one sees an intentional act in someone else and then when they perform that same action, "mirroring" the behaviour of the other. Mirror neurons also stimulate internally what you see someone else feeling. In which mirror neurons are trained through Hebbian learning, the simultaneous activation of cells leads to pronounced increases in synaptic strength between those cells, meaning "cells that fire together, wire together." In IPNB, infants and children learn emotions like happiness and sadness from their relationships with and mirroring of their primary caregivers. The attuned communication of the caregiver being empathetic and presenting their emotional availability to the infant shapes their emotional development, both verbally and nonverbally. The caregivers reactions to emotions also become the way the child understands which emotions are acceptable, with the child's future relationships possibly being contingent upon the infant caregiver relationship. However, regions including the prefrontal cortex develop into the third decade of life, with basic emotional regulation not being an overly reliant factor on the caregiver.

Growing up in dysfunctional family environments or experiencing social isolation can atrophy the 'emotional' areas of the brain. For example, toxic parent-child attachments involving verbal/physical abuse, and regular angry interactions impairs the child's sense of agency, coherence, and affectivity in interactions with others. Parents with unresolved personal issues may project these emotions onto their children. Internally, elevated cortisol in the limbic region coincides with suboptimal attachment experiences that can kill neurons and alter genes in the hypothalamic pituitary adrenal axis (HPA), which controls stress hormone release. The regulatory molecules that control gene expression can be changed by stress, leading to the accelerated pruning and restructuring of neural networks, increasing latent vulnerability to attachment and mental disorders. Altogether, depending on the healthiness of the child-caregiver relationship, distinct attachment styles identified in clinical observation will be promoted within the child, including secure attachment, anxious-ambivalent attachment, and anxious-avoidant/dismissive-avoidant attachment. Children lacking a secure attachment with their caregiver are more prone to mental illness. Siegel asserts that too few inhibitory fibres connect the middle prefrontal cortex to the amygdala in people with bipolar disorder. An 8-year-old with 900 fibers going connecting to their amygdala to calm it down, needs 600 to make it work well. But during adolescence, high stress levels (as well as probably being genetically induced) can prune half the inhibitory fibres, leading to symptoms (such as mood swings).

Parents damaged by an infant-caregiver attachment issue can unknowingly pass this attachment style to their children. Effective therapy may be able to create new connections and neural nets associated with better regulation of emotions and attuned communication, fostering better interpersonal relationships.

== Applications to practice ==
Although little empirical research asseses the in-depth application of interpersonal neurobiology, various IPNB-informed studies have been conducted.

=== Counselling ===
==== Miller et al. 2016 ====
This small study (n=6) used an interpretative phenomenological analysis (IPA) framework in collecting beliefs about the potential improvements of counsellors clinical practice after learning IPNB in a one-year course. In sum, the counsellors accepted that IPNB facilitated personal and professional development. They reported an increase in compassion, empathy, and acceptance towards self and others. They also reported increased self-awareness, presence in relationships with others, and confidence in their own intuition as clinicians, all of which are proven qualities for effective counselling. The majority of participants noted movement toward more secure attachments, allowing them to better engage with clients. They reported greater awareness of reactions to clients that were due to their own personal histories, allowing them to respond more to clients' needs rather than their own needs. Participants reported that IPNB's perspective on experiences influencing brain development and the mind helped them see individuals' struggles in a less pathological frame. This shift in understanding client struggles was deemed likely to improve the empathy and thus, interpersonal relationship and selected interventions between practitioner and client.

The subjective nature of the IPA framework and small sample size limits the reliability and validity of the study. Participants had relatively homogenous gender and ethnic characteristics, limiting the study's generality.

==== Meyer et al. 2013 ====
Meyer, et al. (2013) addressed IPNB through the biological and interpersonal processes occurring within infant/caregiver relationships, and what this development of the nature vs nurture debate implies for counsellors. The study encouraged counsellors to take a holistic approach to practice, incorporating natural and nurturing influences, such as viewing the emotions learned from caregivers in relation to psychological functioning. Counsellors may measure constructs such as affect regulation to understand a patient's emotional development and relate it to the state of integrative fibres in the prefrontal cortex and limbic system. It recommended implementing IPNB concepts of attachment into the counselling relationship helping form a secure attachment between counsellor and client and aiding the client to reconstruct healthy affect patterns in a safe environment. The study advocated attuned communication, emotional mirroring, and empathy. It advised counsellors to determine what emotional patterns are in effect and attempt the neural wiring of healthy patterns.

=== Therapies ===
==== Badenoch and Cox, 2013 ====
Badenoch and Cox's (2013) text shares their experience of integrating IPNB into group therapy. It reported increased empathetic and mindful awareness between therapist and group members via a thorough understanding of IPNB. They report that this mindful awareness of the self and others assists the integration between prefrontal cortex and limbic regions, enhancing emotional regulation and sense of confidence, followed by increased compassion. This reported calmness provides calms the room, allowing a larger range of experiences to emerge. Infant-caregiver relationships in IPNB are explored to allow patients to recognise that previously believed character flaws may actually be indicative of neurobiological development issues, which decrease shame and heighten self-compassion. Information on neuroplasticity suggesting the potential to rewire unhealthy neural pathways is reported to have alleviated longstanding struggles within the group.

An implicit memory activity involving the recall of a recent pleasant experience e.g., "playing frisbee with my dog in the park last Sunday," and reflecting afterwards was reportedly effective in the group therapy. Recalling the positive feeling allowed patients to be more in-touch with their emotions and strengthen their emotional control. Understanding the types of memories and emotions may enable a group therapist to see participants with greater clarity and to discern the memory patterns affecting the movement or sensations of the body. It may allow group therapists to maintain therapist-patient connections.

=== Other ===
==== Page, L. 2006 ====
Page's (2006) journal illustrates the application of IPNB concepts into leadership/management in constituting organisational change. Page states the mindful and social awareness IPNB-informed teachings can induce may allow more collaborative, contingent communication, allowing others to 'feel felt.' Page then believes this attuned communication and energy is then imitated and mirrored by employees. Over time, neural, mental, and behavioral patterns become engrained within the organisation, encouraging employees to take on the challenge of distributed leadership, enhancing individual and organizational complexity.
