= Garrison Institute =

American non-profit research institute

The Garrison Institute
- Formation: 2003 (23 years ago)
- Purpose: Research institute, political advocacy, and retreat
- Headquarters: Garrison, New York
- President: Diana Calthorpe Rose
- Co-Chair: Jonathan F. P. Rose, Rachel Gutter
- Board of directors: Kaira Jewel Lingo, Dan Siegel, Sebastian Zugman

The Garrison Institute is a non-profit, nonsectarian research institute and social organization founded in, and operating out of, Garrison, New York. The Institute publishes research and reports authored by several scientists with a focus on social justice, sustainability, and diversity. The organization also hosts retreats, symposia, and other social gatherings with the goal of fostering social and environmental change.

== Purpose ==
The Garrison Institute encourages the unity between spiritual teachers, students, organizations, and a diverse range of communities. The Institute aims to support the coalescence of contemplative spiritual teachers, academic scientists, and individuals that seek to develop social and environmental change.

Since 2003, over 75,000 people have participated in the Garrison Institute retreats and programs.

== History ==
The Institute's founders Diana Calthorpe Rose and Jonathan F. P. Rose purchased the headquarters from Open Space Institute on March 20, 2003 with the foundation of the organization. The site was formerly known as Glenclyffe, when it was the 19th century estate of New York Governor and U.S. Secretary of State Hamilton Fish. It is now a renovated version of the 77,000 square foot stone and brick monastery and seminary built by the Capuchin Franciscan Province of St. Mary in 1923.

In 2004, the Hudson River Project was launched to discuss social science and the humanities relating to environmental issues. The Hudson River Project became the Initiative on Transformation Ecology (ITE), now Climate, Mind and Behavior (CMB). In 2005, the Women's Wellness Project was created, a five-year pilot program conducting contemplative-based training for women working to end domestic violence. This was the basis of what became the Initiative on Transforming Trauma (ITT), which is now the institute's Signature Program on Contemplative-Based Resilience (CBR).

The Dalai Lama visited the Institute in the fall of 2003 and blessed it.

== Staff and teachers ==
The Garrison Institute is led by executive director Johnathan Weisner. Teachers and presenters at the Garrison Institute have included Adyashanti, the Dalai Lama, Rajmohan Gandhi, Philip Glass, Daniel Goleman, Mikhail Gorbachev, Paul Hawken, Father Thomas Keating, Sharon Salzberg, Pete Seeger, Roshi Enkyo O’Hara, Peter Senge, Lama Surya Das, Tsoknyi Rinpoche, Yongey Mingyur Rinpoche, and many others.

== Board of trustees ==
- Rachel Gutter, Co-chair
- Jonathan F. P. Rose, Co-chair
- Monica Winsor
- Lisette Cooper
- Will Rogers, Treasurer
- Ruth Cummings
- Paul Hawken
- Diana Calthorpe Rose
- Sharon Salzberg
- Daniel J. Siegel
- Susan Davis
