= George L. Engel =

American internist and psychiatrist (1913–1999)

George Libman Engel
- Born: December 10, 1913; New York City, New York
- Died: November 26, 1999 (aged 85); Rochester, New York
- Education: Dartmouth College; Johns Hopkins University School of Medicine
- Known for: Biopsychosocial model
- Scientific career
- Fields: Psychiatry and Medicine
- Workplaces: University of Rochester Medical Center

George Libman Engel, M.D., (December 10, 1913 – November 26, 1999) was an American Internist who, along with his colleague John Romano, was instrumental in developing and teaching psychosomatic medicine at the University of Rochester Medical Center in Rochester, New York. He was Professor Emeritus of Medicine and Psychiatry at the University of Rochester School of Medicine and Dentistry. He is best known for his formulation of the biopsychosocial model, a general theory of illness and healing.

== History ==
=== Early life ===
Engel was born in New York City in 1913. He completed his undergraduate degree in chemistry from Dartmouth College in 1934. In the same year, he entered Johns Hopkins University School of Medicine in Baltimore, Maryland to study medicine. He received his medical degree in 1938.

=== Academic career ===
Engel began his academic journey at Dartmouth by majoring in chemistry and received his undergraduate degree in 1934. George and his identical twin brother both graduated with M.D. degrees at Johns Hopkins in 1938 and then went on to study Pavlovian behaviorism together at the All-Union Institute of Experimental Medicine located in Leningrad, Russia. He then interned at Mt. Siani Hospital in New York City and stayed for about two and a half years, where he met physicians such as Eli Moschcowitz and Lawrence Kubie were incorporating psychosomatics into the clinical service. At the time, Engel was skeptical of psychoanalysis and psychosomatic medicine. He was committed to purely physical explanations of disease processes.

Engel began a Research Fellowship in Medicine at Harvard Medical School and also Graduate Assistant in Medicine at the Peter Bent Brigham Hospital (now Brigham and Women's Hospital) in 1941. He came under the supervision of physician Soma Weiss, who at this time was becoming interested in psychosomatics. At this time, he first met with psychiatrist John Romano. Romano had arrived in Boston several years before Engel. With the encouragement from Weiss, Engel and Romano collaborated on a study of delusional patients. In 1942, Romano became chairman of the psychiatry department at the University of Cincinnati. Romano invited Engel to join the faculty at Cincinnati and Engel accepted the invitation. At this point Engel converted to the psychosomatic school.

==== University of Rochester ====
Romano was given the opportunity to establish an entirely new psychiatry department at the School of Medicine and Dentistry of the University of Rochester Medical Center in 1946. Engel joined Romano in Rochester. He had dual appointments in psychiatry and medicine departments. He was responsible for establishing a medical psychiatric liaison service staffed largely by internists. He became deeply involved in the incorporation of psychiatric training in the medical school curriculum, and also began his own training in psychoanalysis.

Engel began a collaboration with Franz Reichsman on the Monica project, a study that extended from Monica's infancy to adulthood, in 1953. By the mid-1950s, he was considered one of the major figures in psychosomatic studies. He was prominent in the American Psychosomatic Society. He also edited its journal, Psychosomatic Medicine and began publishing numerous books and articles on the relation of emotion and disease and on the incorporation of these ideas into medical training and clinical practice. Under his direction, the program at the university became a leading center in the development of psychosomatic theory and training. His ideas came to be termed as the biopsychosocial model.

The fundamental assumption of the biopsychosocial model is that health and illness are consequences of the interplay of biological, psychological, and social factors. This concept is particularly important in health psychology. This model was theorised by Engel at Rochester and putatively discussed in a 1977 article in the journal Science.

=== Late years ===
In his later years, Engel never lost his sense of humor and his generosity. He was admired by his students and physicians who worked with him. He died suddenly of heart failure in 1999.

== Awards and honors ==
Engel received many awards and honors from the American College of Physicians and the American Psychiatric Association for his work.

== Publications ==
- Engel, George L., and R.W. Gerard. “The Phosphorus Metabolism of Invertebrate Nerve,” The Journal of Biological Chemistry 112 (1935): 379-392.
- Gurvich, Aleksandr Gavrilovich, and George L. Engel. Mitogenetic Analysis of the Excitation of the Nervous System. Amsterdam: N.v. Noord-Hollandsche Uitgeversmaatschappij, 1937.
- Romano, J., and George L. Engel. “Syncopal Reactions during Simulated Exposure to High Altitude in Decompression Chamber,” War Medicine (1943): 475-489.
- Engel, George L., and J. Romano. Scotomata, Blurring of Vision, and Headache as Complications of Decompression Sickness. Washington, 1943.
- Engel, George L., and J. Romano. “A Migraine-like Syndrome Complicating Decompression Sickness: Clinical and Electroencephalographic Observations,” Transactions of the American Neurological Association (1944): 60-64.
- Engel, George L., and J. Romano. A Migraine-like Syndrome Complicating Decompression Sickness: Scintillating Scotomas, Focal Neurologic Signs and Headache: Clinical and Electroencephalographic Observations. War Medicine (1944): 304-314.
- Romano, J., and George L. Engel. Problems of Fatigue as Illustrated by Experiences in the Decompression Chamber,” War Medicine (1944): 102-105.
- Engel, George L. Fainting: Physiological and Psychological Considerations. Springfield, Ill.: C.C. Thomas, 1950.
- Engel, George L. Fainting. Springfield, Ill.: Thomas, 1962.
- Engel, George L. Psychological Development in Health and Disease. Philadelphia, Saunders, 1962.
- Morgan, William L., and George L. Engel. The Clinical Approach to the Patient. Philadelphia, Saunders, 1969.
- Engel, George L. and William L. Morgan. Interviewing the Patient. London, Philadelphia, Saunders, 1973.
- Engel, George L. "The need for a new medical model: a challenge for biomedicine". Science.1977.196(3):129-136.
- Engel, George L. "The Clinical Application of the Biopsychosocial Model," The American Journal of Psychiatry (1980): 535-544
