= John Romano (physician) =

American physician (1908–1994)

- Born: November 20, 1908; Milwaukee, Wisconsin, USA
- Died: June 19, 1994 (aged 85); Rochester, New York, USA
- Occupations: Physician, psychiatrist

John Romano (November 20, 1908 - June 19, 1994) was an American physician, psychiatrist, and educator whose major interest was in medical education and the important relationship between psychiatry and medicine. He founded the Department of Psychiatry at the University of Rochester and served as chairman from 1946 to 1971. He published over 200 scientific papers and served on several editorial boards including the Journal of Psychiatric Research.

== Early life and education ==
Romano was born in Milwaukee, Wisconsin in 1908 to Nicolo Vincenzo and Frances Louise Romano. His father was an immigrant from Calabria, Italy and a music teacher; his mother, a family welfare worker, was a first-generation Italian-American with Tuscan ancestry. Romano attended Riverside High School, then Marquette University in Milwaukee to receive his B.S. in 1932. He received his M.D. in 1934 from Marquette University School of Medicine.

== Career ==
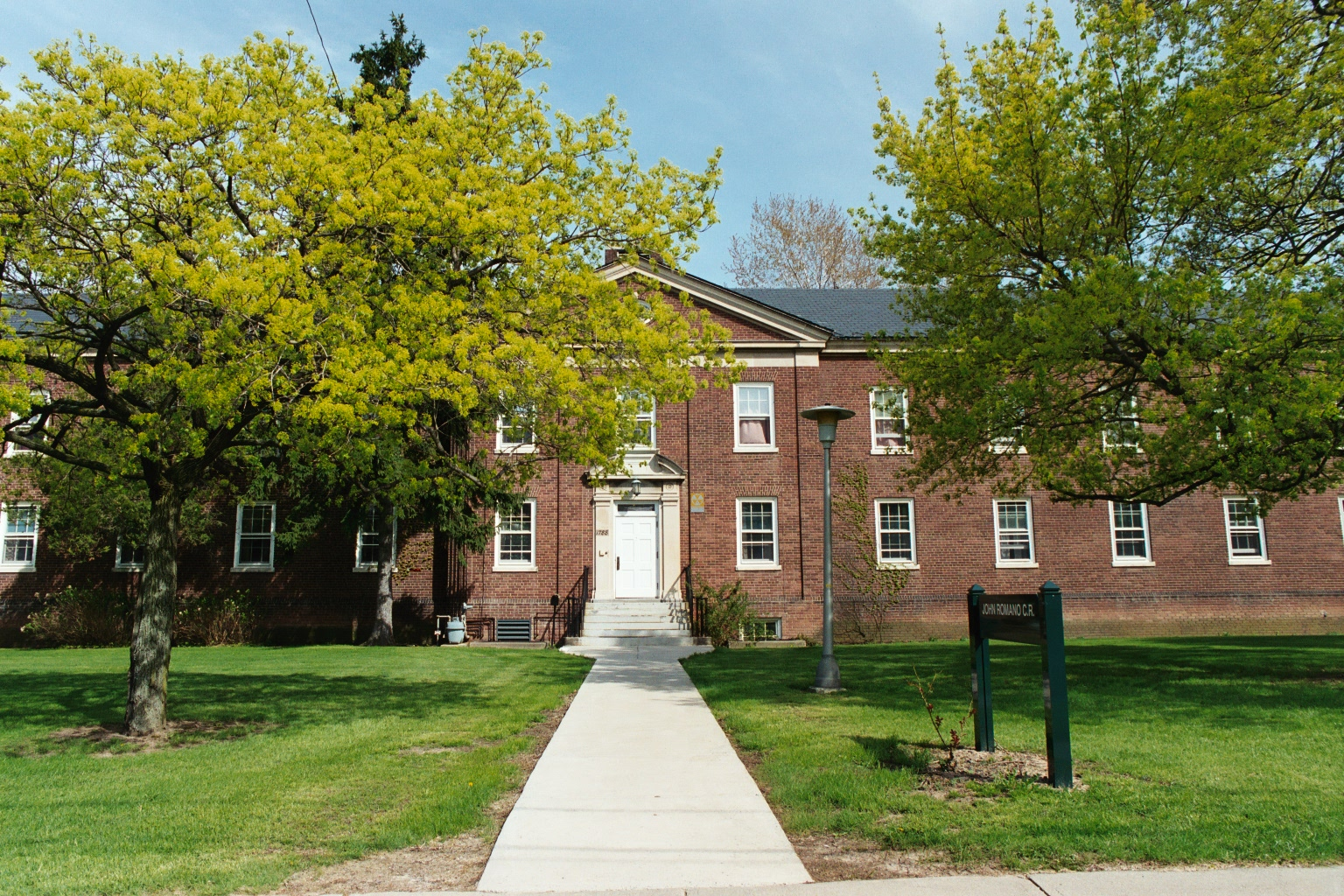
One of the residences on the ground of the Rochester Psychiatric Center was named after John Romano.

Romano interned in medicine at the Milwaukee County General Hospital in 1933-1934 following a year-long externship in psychiatry in the Milwaukee County Asylum for Mental Diseases. He moved on to Yale School of Medicine Hospital, where he broadened his experience in neurology, then was a Commonwealth Fund Fellow in psychiatry at the University of Colorado School of Medicine and an assistant psychiatrist at the Colorado Psychopathic Hospital in Denver. Romano stayed in Colorado from 1935 to 1938, where he worked with Franklin Ebaugh and gained experience in psychosomatic medicine and patient care. He also decided on his specialization and sought additional training in neurology. He worked as a Rockefeller Fellow in Neurology at Boston City Hospital in 1938–1939, then as a Sigmund Freud Fellow in Psychoanalysis at the Boston Psychoanalytic Institute. While there, he taught medicine at Harvard Medical School and was a medical associate at the Peter Bent Brigham Hospital. Romano later reflected that the neurology training had also broadened his knowledge of clinical medicine and psychiatry. He also came to the attention of Soma Weiss, M.D., who had heard of Romano's skill in clinical teaching and research and served as his mentor.

In June 1941, Romano became the chair of the University of Cincinnati College of Medicine's Department of Psychiatry and the Director of Psychiatric Service at Cincinnati General Hospital. There, he worked on improving medical education using mind-body interventions and introduced psychiatric training into all four years of the medical curriculum. He continued his research and studied, among other topics, delirium, fainting, and decompression sickness. While visiting Boston, he met George L. Engel, who had a particular interest in psychosomatic medicine, and recruited him to the faculty at Cincinnati and later at the University of Rochester.

During World War II, he worked as a neurology and psychiatric consultant for the United States Army, a role he would return to in support of the U.S. Army Surgeon General in the 1950s. In 1945, after returning to the United States, he accepted the role of founding chairman in the Psychiatry Department at the University of Rochester School of Medicine & Dentistry. He served in this role until 1971, when he retired. Because the department was so new and the practice of psychiatry had not yet become mainstream, there were few resources for instruction. As such, Romano was heavily involved in student and trainee teaching and spent a lot of time working on medical education. He strongly believed in the importance of medical training in psychiatrics and vice versa. He also introduced psychology and social work training and research into the curriculum.

In 1946, he helped found the National Institute of Mental Health and served as general vice-chairman of the American Red Cross' Advisory Board on Health Services between 1946 and 1949. He served on the original National Advisory Mental Health Council of the United States Public Health Service and, as chair of the Research Study section, worked to get funding for psychiatric research. Romano collected funds and supervised the building of the psychiatric wing, called Wing R, at Rochester's Strong Memorial Hospital in 1949 and sat on the Board of Overseers at Harvard Medical School in 1949–1954. Between 1949 and 1952, he was on the psychiatric training committee for the National Institute of Mental Health and in 1956-1961 chaired their Mental Health Fellowship Grant Committee. He was named a Distinguished University Professor in 1968 and was a senior member of the National Institute of Medicine. In the last decade of his life, he also served on committees and planning groups for the Ford Foundation, the American Medical Association, and the Association of American Medical Colleges, among others.

== Honors and awards ==
The Mental Health Association of Rochester and Monroe County gives an annual award in his name to someone who has made strides in the mental health sphere. He frequently visited patients in the Rochester Psychiatric Center; eventually, a community residence was named in his honor on behalf of the patients.

- 1962: Membership to the American Academy of Arts and Sciences
- 1971: Honorary DSc from Marquette University
- 1971: Gold Medal Award from the University of Rochester Medical School alumni
- 1972: Gold-Headed Cane from the University of California Medical School
- 1973: William Menninger Award from the American College of Physicians
- 1974: Honorary DSc from Hahnemann University Hospital

== Personal life ==
Romano died at Strong Memorial Hospital in Rochester, New York in June 1994 after an acute stroke. He was survived by a son, David, of Philadelphia and three granddaughters, Katherine, Elizabeth, and Sarah. His wife Miriam, who he married in 1933, preceded him in death in 1989.

== Selected publications ==
- Romano, John, and Franklin G. Ebaugh. "Prognosis in Schizophrenia: A Preliminary Report", American Journal of Psychiatry (Nov. 1938): 583–596.
- Romano, John. "Patients' Attitudes and Behavior in Ward Round Teaching," The Journal of the American Medical Association (1941): 664–667.
- Romano, John. "Emotional Components of Illness," Connecticut Medical Journal (1943): 22–25.
- Romano, John, and George L. Engel. "Syncopal Reactions during Simulated Exposure to High Altitude in Decompression Chamber," War Medicine (1943): 475–489.
- Romano, John, and George L. Engel. "Problems of Fatigue as Illustrated by Experiences in the Decompression Chamber," War Medicine (1944): 102–105.
- Romano, John. Adaptation. Ithaca, Cornell University Press, 1949.
- Romano, John. "Twenty-Five years of University Department Chairmanship," American Journal of Psychiatry (June 1966): 7-27.
- Romano, John. "The Teaching of Psychiatry to Medical Students: Past, Present, and Future," American Journal of Psychiatry (Feb. 1970): 1115–1126.
- Romano, John. "The Elimination of the Internship – An Act of Regression," American Journal of Psychiatry (May 1970): 1565–1576.
- Romano, John. "The Teaching of Psychiatry to Medical Students," American Journal of Psychiatry (May 1973): 559–562.
- Romano, John, ed. To Each His Farthest Star: University of Rochester Medical Center, 1925-1975. Rochester, NY: University of Rochester Medical Center, 1975.
- Romano, John. "Emotional and Psychological Responses to Anesthesia and Surgery," American Journal of Psychiatry (Jan. 1981): 133–134.
- Romano, John. "The Chronic Mentally Ill: Treatment, Programs, Systems," American Journal of Psychiatry (Oct. 1982): 1364–1365.
- Romano, John. "Treating the Long-Term Mentally Ill," American Journal of Psychiatry (Sept. 1984): 1120–1121.
