= Biomedical model =

Model of illness

The biomedical model of medicine care is the medical model used in most Western healthcare settings, and is built from the perception that a state of health is defined purely in the absence of illness. The biomedical model contrasts with sociological theories of care.

== History ==
Forms of the biomedical model have existed since before 400 BC, with Hippocrates advocating for physical etiologies of illness. Despite this, the model did not form the dominant view of health until the nineteenth century during the Scientific Revolution.

== Criticism ==
Criticism of the model generally surrounds its perception that health is independent of the social environment in which it occurs, and can be defined one way across all populations. The model is also criticised for its view of the health system as socially and politically neutral, and not as a source of social and political power or as embedded into the structure of society.

== Alternative models ==
The biopsychosocial model is offered as an alternative.

== Features ==
In their book Society, Culture and Health: an Introduction to Sociology for Nurses, health sociologists Karen Willis and Shandell Elmer outline eight 'features' of the biomedical model's approach to illness and health:

- doctrine of specific aetiology: that all illness and disease is attributable to a specific, physiological dysfunction
- body as a machine: that the body is formed of machinery to be fixed by medical doctors
- mind-body distinction: that the mind and body are separate entities that do not interrelate
- reductionism
- narrow definition of health: that a state of health is always the absence of a definable illness
- individualistic: that sources of ill health are always in the individual, and not the environment which health occurs
- treatment versus prevention: that the focus of health is on diagnosis and treatment of illness, not prevention
- treatment imperative: that medicine can 'fix the broken machinery' of ill-health
- neutral scientific process: that health care systems and agents of health are socially and culturally detached

== See also ==
- Biopsychosocial model
- Medical model
- Medical model of disability
- Social model of disability
- Trauma model of mental disorders
