= Judith Shuval =

Israeli sociologist (1925–2025)

- יהודית שובל
- Education Minister Zalman Aran awarding the 1965 Israel Prize for social science to Shuval
- Born: 24 August 1925; New York City, U.S.
- Died: 28 July 2025 (aged 99)
- Education: Bachelor's degree, Hunter College; Bachelor's degree, Jewish Theological Seminary; Ph.D., Radcliffe College, Harvard University
- Occupation: Professor of sociology
- Known for: Medical sociology, immigration studies
- Awards: Israel Prize (1965); Helen De-Roy Prize (1959); Henrietta Szold Award (1995)

Judith Tannenbaum Shuval (Hebrew: יהודית שובל; 24 August 1925 – 28 July 2025) was an Israeli sociologist and academic who was professor of sociology at the Hebrew University of Jerusalem, specializing in public health and immigration.

== Life and career ==
Shuval was born on 24 August 1925 in New York City. She attended Hunter College and later earned a bachelor's degree from the Jewish Theological Seminary. In 1949, she immigrated to Israel and worked at the Israel Institute of Applied Social Research. She completed her Ph.D. in sociology from Radcliffe College at Harvard University in 1955. That same year, she was appointed an adviser on immigrant absorption for UNESCO.

Shuval was hired by the Hebrew University in Jerusalem as a lecturer in sociology in 1968. She eventually became the Louis and Pearl Rose Professor of Medical Sociology. During the 1978–1979 academic year, and again in 1981, she was a visiting professor of sociology at the University of Michigan at Ann Arbor. She also represented Israel at the European Society for Health and Medical Sociology in 1983 and served as chairwoman of the Israeli Sociological Association from 1986 to 1988.

Shuval retired in 1994, and died on 28 July 2025, one month before her 100th birthday.

== Awards and honors ==
- In 1959, Shuval received the Helen De-Roy prize, given by the Society for the Study of Social Problems.
- In 1965, she was awarded the Israel Prize for sociology.
- In 1995, Hadassah awarded her the Henrietta Szold Award for public medicine and hygiene.

== Publications ==
- Immigrants on the Threshold 1963
- The Dynamics of Transition: Entering Medicine 1979
- Social Functions of Medical Practice (with A. Antonovsky and A.M. Davies) 1970
- Newcomers and Colleagues: Soviet Immigrant Physicians in Israel 1984
- Immigrant Physicians: Former Soviet Doctors in Israel, Canada and the United States (with J.H.Bernstein) 1997
- Immigration to Israel: Sociological Perspectives (with E.Leshem) 1998 [Immigration to Israel: Sociological Perspectives]
- Social Structure and Health in Israel (with O.Anson) 2000

== See also ==
- List of Israel Prize recipients
