= Louis Cozolino =

American psychologist (born 1953)

Louis John Cozolino (born April 16, 1953) is an American psychologist and professor of psychology at Pepperdine University. He holds degrees in philosophy from the State University of New York at Stony Brook, theology from Harvard University and a Ph.D. in clinical psychology from UCLA. He has conducted empirical research in schizophrenia, the long-term impact of stress, and child abuse. Cozolino has published numerous articles, several books, and maintains a clinical and consulting practice in Los Angeles.

== The social brain ==
Cozolino's more recent writings focus on the evolution of the human brain into a social organ and the ways in which brains connect to attune, communicate, and regulate one another. He uses the term "sociostasis" to describe how we have evolved to regulate each other's metabolic activation, emotions, and behavior.

== The social synapse ==
Cozolino introduced the concept of the social synapse, the medium through which we are linked together into larger organisms such as families, tribes, societies and the human species as a whole. "Gaze, pupil dilation, facial expressions, posture, proximity, touch, and mirror systems are all reflexive and obligatory systems that work below conscious awareness. These and other systems yet to be discovered create a high-speed information linkup between us, establishing ongoing physiological and emotional synchrony."

== Sociostasis ==
Cozolino uses the term sociostasis to describe the reciprocal influence individuals have on one another as they regulate each other's biology, psychology, and states of mind across the social synapse. It is an expansion of the way Murray Bowen described the emotional homeostasis that exists within families that influences separation and individuation.

== Social status schema ==
In his book Why Therapy Works, Cozolino proposed his theory of social status schema. This theory proposes that we are programmed early in life, via emotional experience he calls core shame, to act as alphas or betas in social groups. Core shame results in a deep insecurity about speaking up or being too visible in groups which makes us easy to lead by those who behave as alphas. Cozolino says that while psychologists most often interpret shame as the result of early negative life experiences, he suggests that core shame may be a psychological consequence of a deeper biological strategy of natural selection to organize us into a group hierarchy with a higher probability of survival.

== The executive brains ==
Cozolino posits a theory of executive functioning described in his "The Pocket Guide to Neuroscience for Clinicians" which suggests that there are three separate and interacting executive systems within the human brain. The first executive system, and the most primitive, is centered in the amygdala and controls basic approach/avoidance and fight/flight/freeze reactions. The second executive system is located within networks of the parietal and frontal cortices and the connecting fibers which join them. This system, the one most usually associated with executive functioning, models space (parietal) and time (frontal) allowing us to navigate four dimensional space, solve problems, maintain a memory of the future, and develop abstract reasoning abilities. This system has been explored in research referred to as P-FIT (Parietal-Frontal Intelligence Theory). The third executive system, referred to as the Default Mode Network (DMN), organizes our experience of self and others and is related to self-reflective capacity, theory of mind, attunement, empathy, and compassion.

These three systems have different evolutionary histories, developmental courses, and are shaped by both template genetics and epigenetic processes. They are also anti-correlational to different degrees, meaning that activation of one is capable of down regulating and/or inhibiting the activation and functioning of the others. The clearest example of this is the decrease in both the second and third executive systems during high states of arousal triggered by the first (amygdala) executive. The application of this theory to clinical and consultive work is explored in a number of Cozolino's more recent works.

== The neuroscience of psychotherapy ==
In The Neuroscience of Psychotherapy, Cozolino synthesizes the field of psychotherapy with findings from neurology, neuroscience, and neurochemistry to provide a model for the underlying mechanisms of action in the therapeutic process. He describes four key principles for enhancing neuroplasticity in the human brain/mind complex: secure relationships, a low to moderate level of physiological arousal, a balance of emotional and cognitive processing, and the construction of coherent narratives about the self, relationships, and the world.

== Personal life ==
Cozolino married Susan Evich in 2005 and they have one child, Sam. They all live in Westchester, Los Angeles and Cozolino has an office in Westwood.

== Books ==
- (2002): The Neuroscience of Psychotherapy: Building and Rebuilding the Human Brain, W.W. Norton & Company, New York.
- (2004): The Making of a Therapist: A Practical Guide for the Inner Journey, W.W. Norton & Company, New York, W W Norton page.
- (2006): The Neuroscience of Human Relationships: Attachment and the Developing Social Brain, W.W. Norton & Company, New York. W W Norton page
- (2008): The Healthy Aging Brain: Sustaining Attachment, Attaining Wisdom, W.W. Norton & Company, New York. W W Norton page
- (2010): The Neuroscience of Psychotherapy, 2nd edition, Healing the Social Brain, W.W. Norton & Company, New York. W W Norton page
- (2012): The Neuroscience of Human Relationships: Attachment and the Developing Social Brain, 2nd Edition, W.W. Norton & Company, New York.
- (2013): The Social Neuroscience of Education: Optimizing Attachment & Learning in the Classroom, W.W. Norton & Company, New York. W W Norton page
- (2014): Attachment-Based Teaching, W.W. Norton & Company, New York.
- (2015): Why Therapy Works: Using Your Mind to Change Your Brain, W.W. Norton & Company, New York.
- (2018): Timeless: Nature's Formula for Health and Longevity, W.W. Norton & Company, New York.
- (2020): The Pocket Guide to Neuroscience for Clinicians, W.W. Norton & Company, New York.
- (2021): The Development of a Therapist, W.W. Norton & Company, New York.
