= Sociology of Health and Illness =

- Discipline: Sociology of health and illness
- Language: English
- Edited by: Professor Karen Lowton and Professor Flis Henwood

Publication details
- History: 1979-present
- Publisher: Wiley-Blackwell on behalf of the Foundation for the Sociology of Health and Illness
- Frequency: 8/year
- Impact factor: 2.9 (2022)

Standard abbreviations
- ISO 4: Sociol. Health Illn.

Indexing
- ISSN: 0141-9889 (print); 1467-9566 (web)
- LCCN: 81646145
- OCLC no.: 757396445

Links
- Journal homepage

Sociology of Health & Illness (SHI) is a peer-reviewed academic journal which covers the sociological aspects of health, illness, medicine, and health care. It is published by Wiley-Blackwell on behalf of the Foundation for the Sociology of Health and Illness. Established in 1979, the journal was originally published by Routledge and Kegan Paul (up to 2002). The Editorial Team is currently led by Karen Lowton (University of Sussex) and Flis Henwood (University of Brighton) as joint Editors in Chief. Other members of the team are: Dr Catherine Will, Dr Ben Fincham, Dr Catherine Theodosius, Professor Gillian Bendelow and Dr Sasha Scambler.

During the years, the annual number of issues has risen from three to four (1986), five (1993), six (1998) and seven (2003) to eight times a year since 2012. According to the Journal Citation Reports, the journal had an impact factor of 1.735 in 2012, 1.89 in 2016, and currently stands at 2.9 in 2022. The journal was ranked in 2022 as follows:

- 88/181 (Public, Environmental & Occupational Health (Social Science))
- 15/45 (Social Sciences, Biomedical)
- 39/149 (Sociology)

== See also ==
- Sociology of health and illness
