= List of University of Rochester people =

Here follows a list of notable alumni, non-graduate attendees, faculty, and presidents of the University of Rochester. The institution has more than 120,000 living alumni as of 2022.

Note: Some individuals are listed in multiple categories (e.g., alumni who were also members of the faculty). In such cases, a parenthetical note identifies the second relevant category. Recipients of honorary degrees from the university are not included. All degree years are for bachelor's degrees unless otherwise noted. For a list of alumni of the Eastman School of Music, see List of Eastman School of Music people.

== Notable alumni ==
=== Nobel laureates ===
Name	Class Year	Notability	Reference
Harvey J. Alter	1956; 1960 (MD)	2020 Nobel Prize in Physiology or Medicine	
Steven Chu	1970	1997 Nobel Prize in Physics, 12th United States Secretary of Energy	
Daniel Carleton Gajdusek	1943	1976 Nobel Prize in Physiology or Medicine	
Arthur Kornberg	1941 (MD)	1959 Nobel Prize in Physiology or Medicine	
Masatoshi Koshiba	1955 (PhD)	2002 Nobel Prize in Physics	
Donna Strickland	1989 (PhD)	2018 Nobel Prize in Physics	
Richard Thaler	1970 (MA), 1974 (PhD)	2017 Nobel Prize in Economics (see also under 'Notable faculty')	
Vincent du Vigneaud	1927 (PhD)	1955 Nobel Prize in Chemistry	

=== National Medal winners ===
Name	Class Year	Notability	Reference
George Abbott	1911	National Medal of Arts, writer and director	
David A. Berry	1967	National Humanities Medal, educator	
D. Allan Bromley	1952 (PhD)	National Medal of Science, physicist	
Esther M. Conwell	1945 (MS)	National Medal of Science, chemist and physicist (see also under 'Notable faculty')	
Robert Dicke	1939 (PhD)	National Medal of Science, astrophysicist	
Renée Fleming	1983 (MM)	National Medal of Arts, singer	
Donald Henderson	1954 (MD)	National Medal of Science, Presidential Medal of Freedom, epidemiologist	
Evelyn Brooks Higginbotham	1984 (PhD)	National Humanities Medal, historian	
James V. Neel	1939 (PhD); 1944 (MD)	National Medal of Science, geneticist	
John Prausnitz	1951 (MS)	National Medal of Science, chemist	
John Clarke Slater	1920	National Medal of Science, physicist	
Alejandro Zaffaroni	1949 (PhD)	National Medal of Technology, biotechnology entrepreneur	

=== National academy members ===
Alumni listed here were elected to the National Academies of Sciences, Engineering, and Medicine, the American Academy of Arts and Sciences, the American Academy of Arts and Letters, or national academies outside the United States.

Name	Class Year	Notability	Reference
Girish Agarwal	1969 (PhD)	The Royal Society, Indian National Science Academy, physicist	
Michelle Albert	1994 (MD)	National Academy of Medicine, physician	
John Aldrich	1975 (PhD)	American Academy of Arts and Sciences, political scientist	
David Amaral	1977 (PhD)	National Academy of Medicine, psychiatrist	
Dominick Argento	1958 (DMA)	American Academy of Arts and Letters, composer, recipient of the Pulitzer Prize	
Linda Birnbaum	1967	National Academy of Medicine, microbiologist	
E. Sandra Byers	1973	The Royal Society of Canada, psychologist and sexologist	
Laura Carstensen	1978	National Academy of Medicine, American Academy of Arts and Sciences, psychologist	
Daniel Diermeier	1995 (PhD)	American Academy of Arts and Sciences, political scientist, 9th Chancellor of Vanderbilt University	
Robert S. Edgar	1957 (PhD)	National Academy of Sciences, American Academy of Arts and Sciences, geneticist	
Stephen Fantone	1979 (PhD)	National Academy of Engineering, optical engineer	
Timothy Feddersen	1993 (PhD)	American Academy of Arts and Sciences, political scientist	
Clement Finch	1941 (MD)	National Academy of Sciences, American Academy of Arts and Sciences, hematologist	
Morris Fiorina	1972 (PhD)	National Academy of Sciences, American Academy of Arts and Sciences, political scientist	
Robert Fogelin	1955	American Academy of Arts and Sciences, philosopher	
Gilles Fontaine	1974 (PhD)	The Royal Society of Canada, astrophysicist	
Kenneth French	1978 (MBA), 1981 (MS), 1983 (PhD)	American Academy of Arts and Sciences, economist	
Grove Karl Gilbert	1862	National Academy of Sciences, American Academy of Arts and Sciences, geologist, 1st Chief Geologist of the United States Geological Survey	
Robert Gomer	1949 (PhD)	National Academy of Sciences, American Academy of Arts and Sciences, chemist and physicist	
Amit Goyal	1988 (MS), 1991 (PhD)	National Academy of Engineering, engineer	
Jerry Green	1967, 1970 (PhD)	American Academy of Arts and Sciences, economist	
Jane Guyer	1972 (PhD)	National Academy of Sciences, American Academy of Arts and Sciences, anthropologist	
N. Katherine Hayles	1977 (PhD)	American Academy of Arts and Sciences, literary scholar	
Susan Hockfield	1973	American Academy of Arts and Sciences, neuroscientist, 16th President of MIT	
John D. Huber	1991 (PhD)	American Academy of Arts and Sciences, political scientist	
Peter van Inwagen	1969 (PhD)	American Academy of Arts and Sciences, philosopher	
Gregory Kealey	1978 (PhD)	The Royal Society of Canada, historian	
David T. Kearns	1952	American Academy of Arts and Sciences, 1st U.S. Deputy Secretary of Education, Chairman and CEO of Xerox	
Young-Kee Kim	1990 (PhD)	National Academy of Sciences, American Academy of Arts and Sciences, physicist	
H. Jeff Kimble	1977 (PhD)	National Academy of Sciences, physicist	
Galway Kinnell	1949 (MA)	American Academy of Arts and Letters, American Academy of Arts and Sciences, poet, MacArthur Fellow, recipient of the Pulitzer Prize and National Book Award	
Clifford Kubiak	1980 (PhD)	American Academy of Arts and Sciences, chemist	
John G. Levi	1969	American Academy of Arts and Sciences, lawyer, Chair of the Legal Services Corporation	
Richard Locksley	1976 (MD)	National Academy of Sciences, American Academy of Arts and Sciences, immunologist	
Jonathan Lunine	1980	National Academy of Sciences, astrophysicist	
Arthur Lupia	1986	American Academy of Arts and Sciences, political scientist	
Harmit Malik	2000 (PhD)	National Academy of Sciences, American Academy of Arts and Sciences, biologist	
Ho-Kwang Mao	1968 (PhD)	National Academy of Sciences, The Royal Society, Chinese Academy of Sciences, geophysicist	
Diane Mathis	1978 (PhD)	National Academy of Sciences, American Academy of Arts and Sciences, hematologist	
Bernadette Mazurek Melnyk	1992 (PhD)	National Academy of Medicine, nurse	
Richard McKelvey	1973 (PhD)	National Academy of Sciences, American Academy of Arts and Sciences, political scientist	
Edward Mendelson	1966	American Academy of Arts and Sciences, literary scholar	
Henry Metzger	1953	National Academy of Sciences, immunologist	
Edward D. Miller	1968 (MD)	National Academy of Medicine, anesthesiologist, Dean of the Johns Hopkins University School of Medicine	
James D. Morrow	1982 (PhD)	American Academy of Arts and Sciences, political scientist	
Carol Nadelson	1961 (MD)	American Academy of Arts and Sciences, psychiatrist	
Norman Neureiter	1952	American Academy of Arts and Sciences, scientist and governmental advisor	
Roger Nicoll	1968 (MD)	National Academy of Sciences, American Academy of Arts and Sciences, neuroscientist	
Peter Ordeshook	1969 (PhD)	American Academy of Arts and Sciences, political scientist	
Charles S. Parmenter	1963 (PhD)	National Academy of Sciences, chemist	
Terence Parsons	1961	American Academy of Arts and Sciences, philosopher	
James Breck Perkins	1867	American Academy of Arts and Letters, historian, Member of the U.S. House of Representatives from New York	
Keith T. Poole	1978 (PhD)	American Academy of Arts and Sciences, political scientist	
Alan S. Rabson	1948	National Academy of Medicine, pathologist, Deputy Director of the National Cancer Institute	
Hermann Rahn	1938 (PhD)	National Academy of Sciences, American Academy of Arts and Sciences, physiologist	
Richard Rashid	1977 (MS), 1980 (PhD)	National Academy of Engineering, American Academy of Arts and Sciences, computer scientist, founder of Microsoft Research	
David Rohde	1971 (PhD)	American Academy of Arts and Sciences, political scientist	
Roberta Romano	1973	American Academy of Arts and Sciences, legal scholar	
Joan Roughgarden	1968	American Academy of Arts and Sciences, biologist and ecologist	
Ivan Sag	1971	American Academy of Arts and Sciences, linguist and cognitive scientist	
José Scheinkman	1974 (PhD)	National Academy of Sciences, American Academy of Arts and Sciences, economist	
Nevin Scrimshaw	1945 (MD)	National Academy of Medicine, American Academy of Arts and Sciences, nutritionist, recipient of the World Food Prize	
John H. Seinfeld	1964	National Academy of Sciences, National Academy of Engineering, American Academy of Arts and Sciences, atmospheric scientist, recipient of the Tyler Prize	
Kenneth Shepsle	1970 (PhD)	National Academy of Sciences, American Academy of Arts and Sciences, political scientist	
Kalyan Bidhan Sinha	1969 (PhD)	Indian Academy of Sciences, Indian National Science Academy, mathematician	
Hugo F. Sonnenschein	1961	National Academy of Sciences, American Academy of Arts and Sciences, economist, 11th President of the University of Chicago	
Gary Starkweather	1966 (MS)	National Academy of Engineering, engineer, inventor of the laser printer, elected to the National Inventors Hall of Fame	
Franklin Stahl	1956 (PhD)	National Academy of Sciences, American Academy of Arts and Sciences, molecular biologist, MacArthur Fellow	
Frank Stillinger	1955	National Academy of Sciences, chemist	
Patricia Stone	1997 (PhD)	National Academy of Medicine, nurse	
Paul E. Turner	1988	National Academy of Sciences, American Academy of Arts and Sciences, biologist and virologist	
Lynn Vavreck	1997 (PhD)	American Academy of Arts and Sciences, political scientist	
Tener Goodwin Veenema	1992 (MS), 1999 (MPH), 2001 (PhD)	National Academy of Medicine, public health scientist	
George Walker	1956 (DMA)	American Academy of Arts and Letters, composer, recipient of the Pulitzer Prize	
Ian Walmsley	1986 (PhD)	The Royal Society, optical physicist, Provost of Imperial College London	
Robert Ward	1939	American Academy of Arts and Letters, composer, recipient of the Pulitzer Prize	
Nils Yngve Wessell	1938 (PhD)	American Academy of Arts and Sciences, psychologist, 8th President of Tufts University	
Robert H. Wiebe	1957 (PhD)	American Academy of Arts and Sciences, historian	
James C. Wyant	1969 (PhD)	National Academy of Engineering, optical scientist, 1st Dean of the University of Arizona College of Optical Sciences	
Herbert York	1942 (BS, MS)	American Academy of Arts and Sciences, nuclear physicist, 1st Chancellor of the University of California, San Diego, 1st Chief Scientist at DARPA	
Martin Zanni	1994	National Academy of Sciences, American Academy of Arts and Sciences, chemist	
Muhammad Suhail Zubairy	1978 (PhD)	Pakistan Academy of Sciences, optical physicist	

=== Academia ===
==== Institutional leaders ====
Name	Class Year	Notability	Reference
Galusha Anderson	1858	8th President of Denison University, 5th President of the Old University of Chicago	
Sheila Blumstein	1965	President (interim), Dean of the College, Brown University	
Myles Brand	1967 (PhD)	4th President of the NCAA, 16th President of Indiana University, 14th President of the University of Oregon	
Ilene Busch-Vishniac	1976	9th President of the University of Saskatchewan, Dean of the Whiting School of Engineering, Johns Hopkins University	
Bonnie Thornton Dill	1965	Dean of the College of Arts and Humanities, University of Maryland, College Park	
Robert J. Dolan	1977 (PhD)	Dean of the Ross School of Business, University of Michigan	
Bernard T. Ferrari	1970, 1974 (MD)	2nd Dean of the Carey Business School, Johns Hopkins University	
Merrill Edwards Gates	1870	6th President of Amherst College, 9th President of Rutgers University	
Robyn E. Hannigan	1997 (PhD)	19th President of Ursinus College	
Bernard Harleston	1955 (PhD)	9th President of City College of New York	
Karen R. Hitchcock	1969 (PhD)	18th Principal and Vice Chancellor of Queen's University, 16th President of the University at Albany	
Marc Holzer	1966	1st Dean of the School of Public Affairs and Administration, Rutgers University	
Emory William Hunt	1884	10th President of Denison University, 6th President of Bucknell University	
Alan Hurwitz	1980 (EdD)	10th President of Gallaudet University	
Malcolm MacVicar	1859	1st Chancellor of McMaster University	
Sugata Marjit	1985 (PhD)	52nd Vice Chancellor of the University of Calcutta	
Joseph B. Martin	1971 (PhD)	6th Chancellor of the University of California, San Francisco, former Dean of Harvard Medical School and the UCSF School of Medicine	
Nancy McGlen	1975 (PhD)	Dean of the College of Arts and Sciences, Niagara University	
Leonard Chapin Mead	1939 (PhD)	Acting President of Tufts University	
Peter Mennin	1947 (PhD)	5th President of the Juilliard School	
William J. Milne	1868	8th President of the University at Albany, President of the State University of New York at Geneseo	
Brian C. Mitchell	1981 (PhD)	16th President of Bucknell University, 11th President of Washington & Jefferson College	
Lemuel Moss	1858	6th President of Indiana University, 2nd President of the Old University of Chicago	
David Nash	1981 (MD)	1st Dean of the College of Population Health, Thomas Jefferson University	
George Daniel Olds	1873	9th President of Amherst College	
Paul J. Olscamp	1962 (PhD)	8th President of Bowling Green State University	
David Oppenheim	1943	2nd Dean of the Tisch School of the Arts, New York University	
Maria Oudeman	(MBA)	President of Utrecht University	
Harold Paz	1977, 1982 (MD)	Dean of the College of Medicine, Pennsylvania State University	
Philip A. Pizzo	1970 (MD)	Dean of the Stanford University School of Medicine	
Joseph Platt	1937	8th President of Claremont Graduate University, 1st President of Harvey Mudd College	
Jonathan Samet	1970 (MD)	Dean of the Colorado School of Public Health	
Gary Schuster	1971 (PhD)	President (interim), Provost of the Georgia Institute of Technology	
Eileen Sullivan-Marx	1980 (MS)	Dean of the Rory Meyers College of Nursing, New York University	
James Monroe Taylor	1868	4th President of Vassar College	
Joseph F. Volker	1941 (PhD)	1st President of the University of Alabama at Birmingham, 1st Chancellor of the University of Alabama System	

==== Professors and researchers ====
Name	Class Year	Notability	Reference
Alan Abramowitz	1969	political scientist	
Charles M. Achilles	1959, 1962 (MS), 1965 (EdS), 1967 (EdD)	education scholar	
Shirley J. Allen	1992 (PhD)	first black and deaf woman to earn a doctorate	
Willard Myron Allen	1932 (MD)	gynecologist, co-discoverer of progesterone	
Frederick R. Bieber	1976 (MS)	medical geneticist	
Robert N. Burr	1939	historian	
C. Ondine Chavoya	2002 (PhD)	art historian	
Sarah Demers	2001 (MA), 2005 (PhD)	physicist	
Anthony Devaney	1971 (PhD)	electrical engineer	
Bernadette Drummond	1982 (MS)	professor of dentistry	
Elon Howard Eton	1890, 1893 (MA)	ornithologist	
C. Lawrence Evans	1988 (PhD)	political scientist	
Hany Farid	1988	computer scientist	
Ed Folsom	1972 (MA), 1976 (PhD)	literary scholar	
Paul Frommer	1965	linguist	
Barry L. Gan	1970, 1981 (MA), 1984 (PhD)	philosopher	
Steven Hahn	1978	historian, recipient of the Pulitzer Prize	
Paul M. Healy	1981 (PhD)	business scholar	
Zvi Hercowitz	1980 (PhD)	economist	
Olivia Hooker	1962 (PhD)	psychologist, civil rights pioneer	
Richard Isay	1961 (MD)	psychologist	
Beata Javorcik	1994	economist	
Francis Kelsey	1880	philologist and archeologist	
Bruce Kingma	1989 (PhD)	economist	
Stephen Kotkin	1981	historian	
Frederick D. Losey	1891	Shakespearian scholar and elocutionist	
Christopher J. Mayer	1987	economist	
Arthur R. Miller	1956	legal scholar	
Philip Nel	1992	literary scholar	
Patricia Numann	1962	surgeon	
Derek Peterson	1993	historian, MacArthur Fellow	
Walter Rauschenbusch	1884	Social Gospel theologian	
John R. Reed	1963 (PhD)	literary scholar, Guggenheim Fellow	
Mark Rosenzweig	1943, 1944 (MS)	psychologist	
Richard M. Ryan	1981 (PhD)	psychologist, co-founder of self-determination theory (see also under 'Notable faculty')	
William Amasa Scott	1886, 1889 (AM)	economist	
Elba Serrano	1973	neuroscientist, recipient of the PAESMEM	
George Sudarshan	1958 (PhD)	physicist	
Rudolph E. Tanzi	1980	neurologist	
Steven M. Weinreb	1967 (PhD)	chemist	
David Sloan Wilson	1971	biologist	

=== Arts ===
Alumni listed here are notable for their work in the performing arts, visual arts, or arts administration.

Name	Class Year	Notability	Reference
Jeff Beal	1985	composer, Emmy Award winner	
Doug Besterman	1985	orchestrator, Tony Award winner	
Julia Bullock	2009	singer and actor, Grammy Award winner	
Ron Carter	1959	jazz musician, Grammy Award winner	
Alexander Courage	1941	composer, Emmy Award winner	
William Dooley	1954	singer	
Frederick Fennell	1937, 1939 (MA)	conductor	
Joseph Fennimore	1962	composer	
Robert Forster	1964	actor	
Steve Gadd	1968	drummer	
Anthony Dean Griffey	2001 (MM)	singer, Grammy Award winner	
Michael Kanfer	1980	visual effects artist, Academy Award winner	
Emil J. Kang	1990	arts administrator	
Ulysses Kay	1940 (MM)	composer	
Naomie Kremer	1975	visual artist	
John La Montaine	1942	composer, Pulitzer Prize winner	
Tony Levin	1968	bass player	
Bob Ludwig	1966, 2001 (MM)	mastering engineer, Grammy Award winner	
Chuck Mangione	1963	jazz musician, Grammy Award winner	
Erin Morley	2002	singer, Grammy Award winner	
Kevin Puts	1994, 1999 (DMA)	composer, Pulitzer Prize winner	
Lance Reddick	1984	actor and musician	
Debra Jo Rupp	1974	actress	
Maria Schneider	1985 (MM)	composer and conductor, Grammy Award winner	
Charles Strouse	1947	composer, Grammy, Emmy, Tony Award winner	
William Warfield	1942, 1946 (MM)	singer and actor, Grammy Award winner	

=== Business ===
Name	Class Year	Notability	Reference
Arunas A. Chesonis	1991 (MBA)	Chairman and CEO of Sweetwater Energy	
Frederick S. Fish	1873	Chairman and President of the Studebaker Corporation	
Gerald Gitner	1968 (MBA)	Chairman and CEO of Trans World Airlines	
Robert Goergen	1960	Founder, Chairman, and CEO of Blyth, Inc.	
Mario Greco	1986 (MA)	CEO of Zurich Insurance	
Richard Handler	1983	Chairman and CEO of Jefferies Group	
Dawne Hickton	1979	Executive Vice President of Jacobs	
Robert T. Huang	1970 (MS), 1976 (MA)	Founder, Chairman, and co-CEO of Synnex	
Jim Kennedy	1975	Chief Communications Officer of News Corp	
Robert M. Lynch	1999, 2000 (MBA)	CEO of Papa John's Pizza	
Manton Marble	1855	Owner and Editor of the New York World	
William F. May	1937	Chairman and CEO of American Can Company	
Barry Meyer	1964	Chairman and CEO of Warner Bros.	
John Rowe	1970 (MD)	Chairman and CEO of Aetna	
Robert Shetterly	1936	Chairman and CEO of Clorox	
Paul Singer	1966	Founder and CEO of Elliott Management Corporation	
Robert L. Stark	1973	Founder and CEO of Stark Enterprises	
Henry Strong	1854	President of the Atchison, Topeka and Santa Fe Railway	
Robert S. Wiesenthal	1988	Founder and CEO of BLADE	
Joseph C. Wilson	1931	Founder and CEO of Xerox	
Guy Wyser-Pratte	1962	Founder and President of Wyser-Pratte Management Co. Inc.	
Gerald B. Zornow	1937	Chairman and President of Eastman Kodak	

=== Government and law ===
==== Heads of state or government ====
Name	Class Year	Notability	Reference
Dae-Whan Chang	1974	Acting Prime Minister of South Korea (2002)	
Elwell Stephen Otis	1858	2nd American Military Governor of the Philippines	

==== Members of the United States Congress ====
Name	Class Year	Notability	Reference
Jacob Sloat Fassett	1875	Member of the U.S. House of Representatives from New York	
Kenneth Keating	1919	United States Senator, Member of the U.S. House of Representatives from New York, United States Ambassador to India and Israel	
Chris Lee	1987	Member of the U.S. House of Representatives from New York	
James M.E. O'Grady	1885	Member of the U.S. House of Representatives from New York, Speaker of the New York State Assembly	
Sereno E. Payne	1864	1st House Majority Leader, U.S. House of Representatives	
Samuel S. Stratton	1937	Member of the U.S. House of Representatives from New York, Mayor of Schenectady, New York	

==== United States ambassadors ====
Name	Class Year	Notability	Reference
Gene Cretz	1972	United States Ambassador to Ghana and Libya	
Lisa J. Peterson	1986	United States Ambassador to Eswatini	
Robert A. Sherman	1975	United States Ambassador to Portugal	
George F. Ward	1965	United States Ambassador to Namibia	

==== Federal officials in the United States ====
Name	Class Year	Notability	Reference
Michael P. Allen	1989	Judge of the United States Court of Appeals for Veterans Claims	
Robert H. Conn	1962 (MS)	Assistant Secretary of the Navy	
W. Scott Gould	1985 (MBA), 1987 (EdD)	5th United States Deputy Secretary of Veterans Affairs	
Charles G. Groat	1962	13th Director of the United States Geological Survey	
Heather Higginbottom	1994	U.S. Deputy Secretary of State for Management and Resources	
Lewis A. Kaplan	1966	Judge of the United States District Court for the Southern District of New York	
Robert Khuzami	1979	Deputy United States Attorney for the Southern District of New York	
John Knight	1893	Chief Judge of the United States District Court for the Western District of New York	
Lawrence Kudlow	1969	12th Director of the National Economic Council	
Allison M. Macfarlane	1986	Chair of the United States Nuclear Regulatory Commission	
Cathy Minehan	1968	12th President of the Federal Reserve Bank of Boston	
Michael O'Rielly	1993	Commissioner of the Federal Communications Commission	
Jimmie V. Reyna	1975	Judge of the United States Court of Appeals for the Federal Circuit	
Harlan Rippey	1898	Judge of the United States District Court for the Western District of New York	
Brian C. Roseboro	1981	U.S. Under Secretary of the Treasury for Domestic Finance	
Dan Rosenthal	1988	Assistant to the President, White House	
Anthony Ryan	1985	U.S. Under Secretary of the Treasury for Domestic Finance	
Robert D. Sack	1960	Judge of the United States Court of Appeals for the Second Circuit	
Graham Steele	2002	Assistant Secretary of the Treasury for Financial Institutions	
Michael Telesca	1952	Judge of the United States District Court for the Western District of New York	
Ellsworth Van Graafeiland	1937	Judge of the United States Court of Appeals for the Second Circuit	
Donald C. Winter	1969	74th United States Secretary of the Navy	

==== Federal officials outside the United States ====
Name	Class Year	Notability	Reference
Chan Onn Fong	1972 (MBA), 1974 (PhD)	2nd Minister of Human Resources, Malaysia	
Vittorio Grilli	1986 (PhD)	5th Minister of Economy and Finance, Italy	
Pedro Guimarães	2004 (PhD)	Chairman of the Federal Savings Bank, Brazil	
Sheng-cheng Hu	1967 (MA), 1970 (PhD)	Minister of the Council for Economic Planning and Development and Chairperson of the Financial Supervisory Commission, Taiwan	
Ephraim Kamuntu	1973 (MS)	17th Minister of Justice and Constitutional Affairs, Uganda	
Eyitayo Lambo	1973 (MA)	Federal Minister of Health, Nigeria	
Awais Leghari	1994	Minister for Power, Pakistan	
Augustine Kpehe Ngafuan	2004 (MBA)	38th Minister of Foreign Affairs and Minister of Finance, Liberia	
Tove Pihl	1948	Member of the Norwegian Parliament	
Nasser Saidi	1977 (MA), 1979 (PhD)	63rd Minister of Economy and Trade, Lebanon	

==== State officials in the United States ====
Name	Class Year	Notability	Reference
Robert S. Babcock	1937	67th Lieutenant Governor of Vermont	
Joseph M. Bailey	1854	Chief Justice of the Supreme Court of Illinois	
Carolyn Berger	1969	Justice of the Supreme Court of Delaware	
Chuck Carpenter	1985	Member of the Oregon House of Representatives	
Alfred C. Carr Jr.	1988	Member of the Maryland House of Delegates	
Moreau S. Crosby	1863	22nd Lieutenant Governor of Michigan	
Barbara Ann DeBuono	1976, 1980 (MD)	New York State Commissioner of Health, Director of the Rhode Island Department of Health	
Mark Ferrandino	1999, 2000 (MA)	Speaker of the Colorado House of Representatives	
Laura Friedman	1988	Member of the California State Assembly	
Jenean Hampton	2003 (MBA)	57th Lieutenant Governor of Kentucky	
Mary Ellen Jones	1958	New York State Senator	
Mary Anne Krupsak	1953	54th Lieutenant Governor of New York	
Richard Leone	1962	Chairman of the Port Authority of New York and New Jersey, State Treasurer of New Jersey	
Sandy Pasch	1981 (MS)	Member of the Wisconsin State Assembly	
George Raines	1866	New York State Senator	
John Rayson	1971	Member of the Florida House of Representatives	
Leland Rayson	1946	Member of the Illinois House of Representatives	
Roger J. Robach	1966	Member of the New York State Assembly	
Adolph J. Rodenbeck	1885	Member of the New York State Assembly, 47th Mayor of Rochester, New York	
Linda Rosenthal	1980	Member of the New York State Assembly	
Ebony Scott	2000	Judge of the Superior Court of the District of Columbia	
Josh Shapiro	1995	48th Governor of Pennsylvania	
Lisa Swain	1980	Member of the New Jersey Assembly	
Ward Tolbert	1902	New York State Senator	
Tony Vargas	2007	Nebraska State Senator	
Akilah Weber	2004 (MD)	Member of the California State Assembly	

==== Others ====
Name	Class Year	Notability	Reference
David Buckel	1980	lawyer, environmental activist	
Malik Evans	2002	71st Mayor of Rochester, New York	
M. Justin Herman	1930	Executive Director of the San Francisco Redevelopment Agency	
Albion Tourgée	1862	lawyer and judge, argued Plessy v. Ferguson	
Mark Zaid	1989	lawyer	

=== Journalism ===
Alumni listed here are notable for their journalism in newspapers, television, radio, or other media.

Name	Class Year	Notability	Reference
Susan B. Anthony II	1938	journalist	
Roscoe Conkling Ensign Brown	1889	Managing Editor of the New York Tribune	
Christopher Carosa	1991 (MBA)	business journalist	
Dudley Doust	1952	sports journalist	
Jean Giambrone	1942	sports journalist	
Bill Kauffman	1981	political journalist and author	
Anne Keefe	1946	journalist	
Stanley Levey	1937, 1939 (MA)	journalist	
Melissa Long	2004 (MBA)	journalist	
Janet Maslin	1970	film and literary critic	
Dan Rattiner	1961	journalist and newspaper publisher	
Madeline Sofia	2016 (PhD)	science journalist	
Harriet Van Horne	1940	journalist	

=== Literature ===
Alumni listed here are notable as authors of drama, fiction, nonfiction, or poetry.

Name	Class Year	Notability	Reference
Karen Alkalay-Gut	1966, 1975 (PhD)	poet	
Benjamin Anastas	1991	novelist	
Suzanne Arms	1965	author, activist	
Neil Baldwin	1969	author	
John M. Barry	1969 (MA)	author	
Francis Bellamy	1876	author of the Pledge of Allegiance	
Christian Cameron	1987	novelist	
Brock Clarke	1998 (PhD)	novelist	
Jennifer Donnelly	1985	novelist, Carnegie Medal winner	
Rossiter Johnson	1863	author and editor	
John Kessel	1972	author, Nebula Award winner	
David Mason	1989 (PhD)	poet	
Cheryl Mendelson	1973 (PhD)	author	
Robert C. O'Brien	1940	author, Newbery Medal winner	
Thomas Perry	1974 (PhD)	novelist	
Dale Peterson	1967	author	
Charles Mulford Robinson	1891	editor, author, pioneer of urban planning	
Betsy Sholl	1969 (MA)	poet	
William Stoddard	1858	author	
Harriet A. Washington	1976	author, National Book Critics Circle Award winner	
William Cleaver Wilkinson	1857	poet and literary critic	

=== Military ===
Name	Class Year	Notability	Reference
Gretchen Herbert	1984	Rear Admiral, United States Navy, Commander of the United States Navy Cyber Forces	
David Ottignon	1997 (MBA)	Lieutenant General, United States Marine Corps, Deputy Commandant for Manpower and Reserve Affairs	
Sean A. Pybus	1979	Vice Admiral, United States Navy, Deputy Commander, U.S. Special Operations Command	
Philip Russell	1958 (MD)	Major General, United States Army, Commander of the United States Army Medical Research and Development Command	
Sidney T. Weinstein	1980 (MBA)	Lieutenant General, United States Army, Deputy Chief of Staff for Intelligence, Department of the Army	

=== Religion ===
Name	Class Year	Notability	Reference
Mariann Budde	1982	Bishop of the Episcopal Diocese of Washington	
Robert Stuart MacArthur	1867	Baptist minister and author	
Jennifer Roback Morse	1980 (PhD)	Catholic activist, founder of the Ruth Institute	
Francis H. Rowley	1875	Baptist minister, hymn writer, animal welfare activist	
Henry Clay Vedder	1873	church historian	

=== Science and technology ===
Name	Class Year	Notability	Reference
Bryce Bayer	1960 (MS)	inventor of the Bayer filter	
Haim Bodek	1995	developer of financial software	
Josh Cassada	2000 (PhD)	astronaut	
Don Catlin	1965 (MD)	pharmacologist, drug testing expert	
Robert J. Cerfolio	1984, 1988 (MD)	surgeon and medical educator	
Lloyd Conover	1950 (PhD)	inventor of tetracycline, elected to the National Inventors Hall of Fame	
Walter Cooper	1957 (PhD)	research scientist	
Corinna Cortes	1993 (PhD)	computer scientist	
Shawn Domagal-Goldman	2001, 2002 (MS)	astrobiologist	
Julian Earls	1966 (MS)	Director of the NASA Glenn Research Center	
Stan Frankel	1942 (PhD)	Manhattan Project scientist and computer designer	
Edward Gibson	1959	astronaut who set a record for space travel	
Michael S. Gottlieb	1973 (MD)	immunologist, first to identify AIDS as a new disease	
William Harkness	1858	astronomer, director at the U.S. Naval Observatory	
Luther Emmett Holt	1875	pediatrician	
Jeannette Klute	1953	pioneer of color photography	
Jay Last	1951	physicist and entrepreneur	
J.C.R. Licklider	1942 (PhD)	computer science pioneer	
William Masters	1943 (MD)	sexologist	
Charles Munnerlyn	1969 (PhD)	optical engineer	
Paul Murdin	1970 (PhD)	astronomer, identified the first known black hole	
Kenneth Ouriel	1977 (MD)	Head of Surgery at the Cleveland Clinic	
James A. Pawelczyk	1982	astronaut	
Sylvester Sanfilippo	1947	pediatrician, discoverer of Sanfilippo syndrome	
Bruce Schneier	1984	computer security expert	
Susan Seacrest	1978 (MS)	environmental activist, teacher	
Avie Tevanian	1983	software engineer	
Eric Topol	1979 (MD)	pioneering cardiologist	
Edward Bright Vedder	1898	medical researcher	

=== Sports ===
Name	Class Year	Notability	Reference
Eric Born	MBA	judoka	
Brian Daboll	1997	NFL coach	
John DiBartolomeo	2013	basketball player	
Terry Gurnett	1977	soccer coach	
Renée Richards	1959 (MD)	tennis player	
Dominic Seiterle	2005 (MBA)	rower, Olympic gold medalist	
Zenon Snylyk	1955	soccer player	

=== Uncategorized ===
Name	Class Year	Notability	Reference
Mary Calderone	1939 (MD)	founder of the Sexuality Information and Education Council of the United States	
Jeremy Glick	1993	passenger on United Airlines Flight 93	
Jonathan D. Quick	1979 (MPH, MD)	family physician and public health management specialist	
Mabel Sine Wadsworth	1931	birth control activist	

== Notable non-graduate attendees ==
Name	Affiliation	Notability	Reference
Angelo Badalamenti	student (transferred)	composer, Grammy Award winner	
Jason Robert Brown	student (withdrew)	composer	
David Diamond	student (transferred)	composer, recipient of the National Medal of Arts	
Shirley Jackson	student (transferred)	author	
Meyer Jacobstein	student (withdrew)	Member of the U.S. House of Representatives from New York	
Ilya Kaminsky	student (transferred)	poet	
Michael O'Donoghue	student (withdrew)	comedy writer, Emmy Award winner	
David Satcher	medical resident	16th Surgeon General of the United States	
George B. Selden	student (withdrew)	inventor	
Rangaswamy Srinivasan	postdoctoral fellow	physicist, recipient of the National Medal of Technology	
Thomas Thackeray Swinburne	student (withdrew)	poet	
Milen Velchev	student (transferred)	Minister of Finance, Bulgaria	

== Notable faculty ==
=== Nobel laureates ===
Name	Affiliation	Notability	Reference
Henrik Dam	Faculty (1942-1945)	1943 Nobel Prize in Physiology or Medicine	
Robert Fogel	Faculty (1960-1965; 1968-1975)	1993 Nobel Prize in Economics	
Gérard Mourou	Faculty	2018 Nobel Prize in Physics	
Paul Romer	Faculty (1986-1990)	2018 Nobel Prize in Economics	
Richard Thaler	Faculty (1974-1978)	2017 Nobel Prize in Economics (see also under 'Notable alumni')	
George Hoyt Whipple	Faculty (1914-1976)	1934 Nobel Prize in Physiology or Medicine	

=== National Medal winners ===
Name	Affiliation	Notability	Reference
Esther M. Conwell	Faculty	National Medal of Science, chemist and physicist (see also under 'Notable alumni')	
Elizabeth Fox-Genovese	Faculty	National Humanities Medal, historian	
Anthony Hecht	Faculty	National Medal of Arts, poet	
Victor Weisskopf	Faculty	National Medal of Science, physicist	

=== National academy members ===
Faculty listed here were elected to the National Academies of Sciences, Engineering, and Medicine, the American Academy of Arts and Sciences, the American Academy of Arts and Letters, or national academies outside the United States.

Name	Affiliation	Notability	Reference
Charles David Allis	Faculty	National Academy of Sciences, National Academy of Medicine, American Academy of Arts and Sciences, molecular biologist, winner of a Lasker Award	
Porter W. Anderson, Jr.	Faculty	National Academy of Sciences, molecular biologist, winner of a Lasker Award	
Richard N. Aslin	Faculty	National Academy of Sciences, American Academy of Arts and Sciences, psychologist	
Lewis White Beck	Faculty	American Academy of Arts and Sciences, philosopher	
Thomas W. Clarkson	Faculty	National Academy of Medicine, toxicologist	
Paul Cohen	Faculty	National Academy of Sciences, American Academy of Arts and Sciences, mathematician, recipient of the Fields Medal	
George W. Corner	Faculty	National Academy of Sciences, physician	
James Druckman	Faculty	American Academy of Arts and Sciences, political scientist	
Lee Alvin DuBridge	Faculty	National Academy of Sciences, American Academy of Arts and Sciences, physicist	
Stanley Engerman	Faculty	American Academy of Arts and Sciences, economic historian, recipient of the Bancroft Prize	
Wallace O. Fenn	Faculty	National Academy of Sciences, physiologist	
Richard Fenno	Faculty	National Academy of Sciences, American Academy of Arts and Sciences, political scientist	
Loretta Ford	Dean, Faculty	National Academy of Medicine, nurse	
Marshall D. Gates Jr.	Faculty	National Academy of Sciences, American Academy of Arts and Sciences, chemist	
Eugene Genovese	Faculty	American Academy of Arts and Sciences, historian, recipient of the Bancroft Prize	
Howard Hanson	Faculty	American Academy of Arts and Letters, composer, recipient of the Pulitzer Prize	
Johannes Holtfreter	Faculty	National Academy of Sciences, American Academy of Arts and Sciences, biologist	
John R. Huizenga	Faculty	National Academy of Sciences, American Academy of Arts and Sciences, physicist	
Ronald W. Jones	Faculty	National Academy of Sciences, American Academy of Arts and Sciences, economist	
Asahel C. Kendrick	Faculty	American Academy of Arts and Sciences, classicist	
Henry E. Kyburg Jr.	Faculty	American Academy of Arts and Sciences, philosopher	
Paul MacAvoy	Dean, Faculty	American Academy of Arts and Sciences, economist	
Leonard Mandel	Faculty	National Academy of Sciences, American Academy of Arts and Sciences, physicist	
Lynne E. Maquat	Faculty	National Academy of Sciences, National Academy of Medicine, American Academy of Arts and Sciences, biochemist, recipient of the Wolf Prize in Medicine	
Robert Marshak	Faculty	American Academy of Arts and Sciences, physicist	
Elizabeth R. McAnarney	Faculty	National Academy of Medicine, pediatrician	
Lionel W. McKenzie	Faculty	National Academy of Sciences, American Academy of Arts and Sciences, economist	
Elliott Waters Montroll	Faculty	National Academy of Sciences, American Academy of Arts and Sciences, mathematician	
Duncan T. Moore	Faculty	National Academy of Engineering, optical engineer	
Shaul Mukamel	Faculty	National Academy of Sciences, American Academy of Arts and Sciences, chemist and physicist	
Maiken Nedergaard	Faculty	Royal Danish Academy of Sciences and Letters, neuroscientist	
Elissa L. Newport	Faculty	National Academy of Sciences, cognitive scientist	
W. Albert Noyes Jr.	Faculty	National Academy of Sciences, French Academy of Sciences, chemist, recipient of the Priestley Medal	
Brian O'Brien	Faculty	National Academy of Sciences, American Academy of Arts and Sciences, optical physicist	
Walter Oi	Faculty	American Academy of Arts and Sciences, economist	
H. Allen Orr	Faculty	American Academy of Arts and Sciences, biologist, recipient of the Darwin–Wallace Medal	
Charles E. Phelps	Provost, Faculty	National Academy of Medicine, economist	
William H. Riker	Faculty	National Academy of Sciences, American Academy of Arts and Sciences, political scientist	
Carl Rogers	Faculty	American Academy of Arts and Sciences, psychologist	
John Romano	Faculty	National Academy of Medicine, American Academy of Arts and Sciences, physician	
Lainie Ross	Faculty	National Academy of Medicine, physician	
Christopher Rouse	Faculty	American Academy of Arts and Letters, composer, recipient of the Pulitzer Prize	
Seymour I. Schwartz	Faculty	National Academy of Medicine, surgeon	
Joanna Scott	Faculty	American Academy of Arts and Sciences, novelist, MacArthur Fellow	
Fred Sherman	Faculty	National Academy of Sciences, biochemist	
Frederick Campion Steward	Faculty	The Royal Society, American Academy of Arts and Sciences, botanist	
Michael Tanenhaus	Faculty	American Academy of Arts and Sciences, cognitive scientist, recipient of the Rumelhart Prize	
Dean S. Tarbell	Faculty	National Academy of Sciences, American Academy of Arts and Sciences, chemist	
Perez Zagorin	Faculty	American Academy of Arts and Sciences, historian	

=== Engineering and mathematics ===
Name	Affiliation	Notability	Reference
Henry Kautz	Faculty	computer scientist, former AAAI President	
William H. Lawton	Faculty	statistician	
Joseph Neisendorfer	Faculty	mathematician	
Isaac Ferdinand Quinby	Faculty	mathematician	
Douglas Ravenel	Faculty	mathematician, winner of the Veblen Prize	
Michael L. Scott	Faculty	computer scientist, winner of the Dijkstra Prize	
Stanley Tennenbaum	Faculty	mathematician	

=== Humanities ===
Name	Affiliation	Notability	Reference
Janet Catherine Berlo	Faculty	art historian	
Peter H. Christensen	Faculty	art historian	
Douglas Crimp	Faculty	art historian	
Robert L. Holmes	Faculty	philosopher	
Th. Emil Homerin	Faculty	Islamic Studies scholar	
Christopher Lasch	Faculty	historian	
James Longenbach	Faculty	literary scholar and poet	
Paul O'Dette	Faculty	musician, Grammy Award winner	
Hyam Plutzik	Faculty	poet	
Stephen Roessner	Faculty	audio engineer, Grammy Award winner	
Frank Shuffelton	Faculty	literary scholar	
Richard Taylor	Faculty	philosopher	
Colin Murray Turbayne	Faculty	philosopher	
Bernard Weisberger	Faculty	historian	

=== Natural sciences ===
Name	Affiliation	Notability	Reference
Daphne Bavelier	Faculty	cognitive scientist	
George Packer Berry	Faculty	bacteriologist	
Robert W. Boyd	Faculty	optical physicist	
Joseph H. Eberly	Faculty	optical physicist, winner of a Townes Award	
Carmala Garzione	Faculty	geologist	
C.R. Hagen	Faculty	physicist, winner of the Sakurai Prize	
Harold Hodge	Faculty	toxicologist	
Robert S. Knox	Faculty	physicist	
Susumu Okubo	Faculty	physicist, winner of the Sakurai Prize	
Daven Presgraves	Faculty	biologist	
Carlos Stroud	Faculty	optical physicist	
Ching W. Tang	Faculty	chemist, inventor of the organic light-emitting diode, winner of the Wolf Prize in Chemistry	
Wolf V. Vishniac	Faculty	microbiologist	
Stafford L. Warren	Faculty	radiologist, inventor of the mammogram, recipient of the Enrico Fermi Award	
Emil Wolf	Faculty	physicist	
Frank E. Young	Dean, Faculty	geneticist	

=== Social sciences ===
Name	Affiliation	Notability	Reference
Edward L. Deci	Faculty	psychologist, co-founder of self-determination theory	
Edward M. Hundert	Dean, Faculty	psychiatrist	
Narayana Kocherlakota	Faculty	economist	
Steven Landsburg	Faculty	economist	
Sam Nolutshungu	Faculty	political scientist	
Charles Plosser	Faculty	economist	
Richard M. Ryan	Faculty	psychologist, co-founder of self-determination theory (see also under 'Notable alumni')	
Mark Zupan	Dean, Faculty	economist	

== Presidents of the University ==
	Name	Birth-Death	Years as President
1	Rev. Martin Brewer Anderson	(1815–1890)	(1853–1888)
2	Rev. David Jayne Hill	(1850–1932)	(1889–1896)
3	Rev. Benjamin Rush Rhees	(1860–1939)	(1900–1935)
4	Alan Chester Valentine	(1901–1980)	(1935–1950)
5	Cornelis Willem de Kiewiet	(1902–1986)	(1951–1961)
6	Wilson Allen Wallis	(1912–1998)	(1962–1970)
7	Robert Lamb Sproull	(1918–2014)	(1970–1984)
8	George Dennis O'Brien	(1931–)	(1984–1994)
9	Thomas H. Jackson	(1950–)	(1994–2005)
10	Joel Seligman	(1950–)	(2005–2018)
11	Sarah C. Mangelsdorf	(1958–)	(2019–Present)
