= Fedderson =

Fedderson is a surname. Notable people with the surname include:

- Don Fedderson (1913–1994), American television executive producer
- Yvonne Fedderson (born 1935), American philanthropist and actress, wife of Don

== See also ==
- Feddersen
