= The Radicalism of the American Revolution =

1993 book by Gordon S. Wood

- Author: Gordon S. Wood
- Genre: History
- Publisher: Alfred A. Knopf
- Publication date: 1991
- Publication place: United States
- Pages: 464
- Awards: Pulitzer Prize for History
- ISBN: 9780679736882

The Radicalism of the American Revolution is a nonfiction book by historian Gordon S. Wood, published by Alfred A. Knopf in 1991. In the book, Wood explores the radical character of the American Revolution. The book was awarded the 1993 Pulitzer Prize for History.

Wood divided the narrative into three parts: monarchy, republicanism, and democracy.

== Background ==
Gordon S. Wood ended The Creation of the American Republic, 1776-1787, a 1969 book based on a dissertation supervised by Bernard Bailyn, with the "End of Classical Politics", the end of a particular iteration of Republicanism in the United States. Wood had argued that, after the Constitutional ratification debates, "the stability of government...now depended upon the prevention of the various social interests from incorporating themselves too firmly in the government...This revolution marked an end of the classical conception of politics."

In 1992, as Wood's The Radicalism of the American Revolution first circulated among scholars, historian Daniel T. Rodgers engaged with the ensuing debates in historiography. Periodization, according to Rodgers, was the source of much controversy between proponents of "Harvard republicanism" and proponents of "St. Louis republicanism." For Wood, the early Republic served as the crucible for Liberalism in the United States. The mark of St. Louis republicanism, by contrast, was a "reluctance to date the 'end of classical politics' as early as Wood had put it." As a result of these fractious disputes, "Republicanism_{H} collapsed all at once in a clatter of constitutional argument. Republicanism_{S} staggered on to a slower death." His review essay did not include the extended periodization in Radicalism.

Wood clarified the vaunted and maligned "End of Classical Politics" in a new preface to his 1969 study. First, he reminded readers, "it is important to remember that the boxlike categories of 'republicanism' and 'liberalism' are essentially the inventions of us historians." The bifurcation of "Harvard republicanism" and "St. Louis republicanism" had been premised on "the mistaken notion that one set of ideas simply replaced another en bloc." After 1787-88, politics became a "competition among interests or parties in the society for control of a quasi-autonomous state...Cultural changes of that magnitude do not take place in such a neat and sudden manner."

== Synopsis ==
In The Radicalism of the American Revolution, Wood argued that in the "classical republican tradition our modern distinction between positive and negative liberties was not yet clearly perceived, and the two forms of liberty were still often seen as one." Wood premised this argument with the notion that "public or political liberty—or what we now call positive liberty—meant participation in government. And this political liberty in turn provided the means by which the personal liberty and private rights of the individual—what we today call negative liberty—were protected." According to Wood, if "disinterestedness" in government "was based on liberty and independence, then it followed that only autonomous individuals free from any ties of interest and paid by no master were qualified to be citizens." Thomas Jefferson hoped that yeomen farmers who depended on their own " 'soil and industry' " would not be entirely dependent on "the casualties and caprice of customers." But for many of Wood's "republican idealists" the "disinterested leadership could only be located among the landed gentry whose income [derived] from the rents of tenants." Merchants attempted to be included in this leadership, aiming for "wealth and leisure sufficient to avoid any day-to-day involvement in their businesses." This distance limited their social interactions, resulting in a conception of the world as small, affective, and almost filial. Banal statements and quotidian events became emotive, which was why they frequently interpreted a series of statements or events as a conspiracy.

The Revolution also sparked unresolved debates over virtue and the "commercial nature of real estate." Wood explained that "virtue became identified with decency" and was "soft and feminized." Ideas of "classical virtue had flowed from the citizen's participation in politics...But modern virtue flowed from the citizen's participation in society, not in government." Wood referred to contentions by Thomas Paine on " 'society' ", which Paine believed were " 'produced by our wants and government by our wickedness; the former promotes our happiness positively by uniting our affections, the latter negatively by restraining our vices.' " Even "someone as different from Paine as James Wilson made a similar point", that is, James Wilson believed that "government was 'highly necessary' only because of man’s 'fallen state.' ” According to Wood, "some now argued that even commerce, that traditional enemy of classical virtue, was in fact a source of modern virtue."

Wood cast early Federalism in the United States as a response to Anti-Federalist questions regarding the very notion of an expansive "[the] United States" and the solecism imperium-in-imperio, sovereignty-within-sovereignty. James Madison and his Federalists offered a last rebuttal: the locus of power, sovereignty, would be vested in "the people", not in organs of government. By the late 1780s, Wood opined, Federalists began to confront "the reality of interests in America", exemplified by Madison's Federalist No. 10. The federal government became a " 'disinterested and dispassionate umpire in disputes between different passions and interests in the State.' "

In the absence of expansive public school systems, potential officeholders needed to become sufficiently educated "to comprehend all the different interests in society." Reading law, out of all the learned professions, would win the electoral day. Anti-Federalists pointed out that attorney profits, even if supplemented by pro bono work, belied this assertion. Not so, rejoined Wood's Alexander Hamilton: "being a lawyer was not an occupation and different from other profit-making activities." Both Federalists and Anti-Federalists ultimately countenanced a surplus of candidates in extended electoral spheres, which Madison conjectured increased campaign competition and the likelihood that anxious elected delegates, despite coming from faraway places, would constantly clamor to reflect constituent "interests."

In Federalist No. 10, Madison held that disinterested representation defined republics, yet attempted to fuse disinterestedness with direct democracy in a system that would later be deemed pluralistic representative democracy. The crux of the matter was the fulfillment of both patrician disinterestedness and representative "authority" over constituent "interests", such as income, vocation, commerce, urban labor, etc. Also, Madison expressed concerns about government by the few, as well as by the many. In writing Federalist No. 62, for instance, Madison grew skeptical of any fiscal " 'regulation' " because, counterintuitively, " 'every new regulation concerning commerce or revenue; or in any manner affecting the value of the different species of property, presents a new harvest to those who watch the change and can trace its consequences.' " Rather than sharing this exclusive purview with the many, " '[these] laws are made for the few.' "

For Federalists, officeholders could persist as disinterested "umpires" and reflective representatives due to "a notion that has carried into our own time---that lawyers and other professionals are somehow free of the marketplace, are less selfish and interested...than merchants and businessmen." Conversely, in Anti-Federalist disquisitions, "the occupations and interests of the society were so diverse and discrete that only individuals sharing a particular occupation or interest could speak for that occupation or interest." In Anti-Federalist demands, and not in Federalist No. 10, "lay the real origins of American pluralism and American interest-group politics."

=== Conclusion ===
Wood concluded Radicalism with the rise of a fledgling Jacksonian democracy, contending that voters appropriated the "Federalist Persuasion" of an "interests"-based popular sovereignty and "celebration of commerce", much to the chagrin of many, but by no means all, of the former persuaders in their twilight years. The late eighteenth-century idea of the "equality" of sensations and benevolent feeling bestowed on a "moral" humanity by the deistic "Creator", gave rise to the idea of equality of opportunity. Wood observed that "elected officials were to bring the partial, local interests of the society, and sometimes even their own interests, right into the workings of government." Also, "all adult white males, regardless of their property holdings of their independence, were to have the right to vote...the Revolution was the most radical and most far-reaching event in American history."

== Reception ==
In 1992, historian Pauline Maier hailed The Radicalism of the American Revolution as "the most important study of the Revolution to appear in over 20 years." On the other hand, she argued that Gordon S. Wood had failed to substantiate the importance of eighteenth-century society to government, and vice-versa. She mused whether this "serious shortcoming" betrayed the lasting impact of a previous "time-bound assumption, still shared by many social scientists despite their rejection of Marxism -- the modern conviction that real revolutions are fundamentally social?" That stated, Wood had always provoked her own "thoughtful doubt and dissent" while "pulling us into higher planes of historical sophistication." The Radicalism of the American Revolution was no exception. Five years later, Wood lauded Maier's American Scripture as "superbly" advancing historiography on the drafting of the Declaration of Independence. Yet he also critiqued her for not taking a position on the degree to which scholars and policymakers should adhere to Abraham Lincoln's approach to the Declaration as "a living document." He further described her "tone in criticizing the shrine in the National Archives" as overly "harsh" and "too strident and angry."

Frank Shuffleton similarly praised the book, arguing that Wood's "convincing explanation of the Revolution's radicalism rests on an impressive knowledge."
