= Gordon Singer =

American businessman

- Born: Gordon M. Singer; 1973 or 1974 (age 51–52)
- Citizenship: American
- Education: Williams College
- Occupation: Hedge fund manager
- Title: Co-managing partner at Elliott Investment Management
- Spouse: Jenny Walsh
- Father: Paul Singer

Gordon M. Singer (born 1973 or 1974) is an American hedge fund manager, co-managing partner at Elliott Investment Management, and the son of billionaire Paul Singer.

== Early life ==
He is the son of Paul Singer. Singer was raised in New Jersey and educated at Williams College in Massachusetts, including a year at Exeter College, Oxford.

== Career ==
He began his career working as a trainee analyst at Lehman Brothers in New York, then joined his father's company in 1998, becoming head of the London office in 2009.

He is co-managing partner at Elliott Investment Management and runs its London office.

== Personal life ==
Singer is married to Jenny Walsh, a fellow Williams College alumnus. They run the Gordon and Jenny Singer Foundation.

Singer is a UK resident, and has dual British-American citizenship.

Singer unsuccessfully tried to donate money to Robert Jenrick during his failed attempt to be leader of the UK Conservative Party leadership in September 2024.
