= Christopher Wood (art historian) =

American art historian

Christopher Stewart Wood (born June 7, 1961) is an American art historian, mostly on German Renaissance art. He is a professor in the Department of German at New York University. He usually publishes as Christopher S. Wood, if only to avoid confusion with Christopher Wood (1941–2009), an English art historian and dealer specializing in Victorian painting.

== Early life and education ==
Christopher Wood is the son of Gordon S. Wood, who was a Pulitzer Prize-winning historian of the early American republic and professor at Brown University. His sister, Amy Wood, is a professor of history at Illinois State University.

Wood was raised in Barrington, Rhode Island, attending Barrington High School. He earned an A.B. in history and literature at Harvard University, completing an honors thesis on Henry Fielding in 1983. After a year on a Deutsche Akademische Austauschdienst fellowship at LMU Munich in Germany, he returned to Harvard and in 1992 received a PhD in fine arts. His dissertation, supervised by Henri Zerner, considered the landscape drawings, prints and paintings of Albrecht Altdorfer. From 1989 to 1992, he was a junior fellow in the Harvard Society of Fellows.

== Career ==
From 1992 to 2014, Wood rose, incrementally, from assistant professor to Carnegie Professor in the History of Art at Yale University. In 2014, he joined the Department of German at New York University.

Wood has also held visiting appointments at the University of California, Berkeley (1997); Vassar College, as Belle Ribicoff Distinguished Visiting Scholar (2001); and Hebrew University, Jerusalem (2007).

From 1999 to 2002, he was book review editor of the journal of the College Art Association, the Art Bulletin. His review of Hans Belting's Bild-Anthropologie, in Art Bulletin 86 (June 2004): 370–73, was selected as one of 38 texts for inclusion in the Art Bulletin Centennial Anthology 1911–2011. In 2019 he published A History of Art History (Princeton University Press, September 2019).

== Research ==
Based on his dissertation, Wood's first book, Albrecht Altdorfer and the Origins of Landscape (Reaktion and Chicago, 1993), was a monograph on the sixteenth-century German painter who created the first pure landscape paintings in the European tradition. This book was reissued with a new afterword in 2014. Wood has published many articles on the art and culture of the German late Middle Ages and Renaissance, including essays on Albrecht Dürer and Albrecht Altdorfer; on drawings; on the cult of images and Reformation iconoclasm; on ex votos; and on early archeological scholarship. He has also written on Italian artists including Piero della Francesca, Raphael, and Dosso Dossi.

In 2000 Wood published an anthology of translated writings by Viennese art historians of the early twentieth century, with an introductory essay: The Vienna School Reader: Politics and Art Historical Method in the 1930s (ZONE Books). His work on the history of the discipline of art history and its meaning within modernity includes articles on Alois Riegl, Josef Strzygowski, Aby Warburg, Erwin Panofsky, Otto Pächt, Ernst Gombrich, and Michael Baxandall. He has translated Panofsky's treatise Perspective as Symbolic Form into English.

Another aspect of his research concerns the coordination of art and history. Early archeological studies, archaism, and typology are the main themes of his Forgery, Replica, Fiction: Temporalities of German Renaissance Art (Chicago, 2008), which was awarded the Susanne M. Glasscock Humanities Book Prize for Interdisciplinary Scholarship. Anachronic Renaissance, co-authored with Alexander Nagel (ZONE, 2010), has been widely reviewed. The French translation (Renaissance anachroniste, Les Presses du Réel) by Françoise Jaouen was awarded the Prix de la traduction of the Salon du livre et de la revue d'art at the Festival de l'histoire de l'art, Fontainebleau, June 2013. Italian (Quodlibet) and Spanish (Akal) translations are in press.

== Honors ==
- Jacob Wendell Scholar, Harvard University (1980)
- John Simon Guggenheim Fellowship (2002)
- NEH Rome Prize Fellowship to the American Academy in Rome (2002–03)
- Ellen Maria Gorrissen Fellow at the American Academy in Berlin (2004)
- Member, School for Historical Studies of the Institute for Advanced Study, Princeton (2011)
- Senior Fellow, Internationales Forschungszentrum Kulturwissenschaften, Vienna (2012)
- Member, American Academy of Arts and Sciences (elected 2016)
