= Charles M. Achilles =

American professor and educational researcher

- Born: September 9, 1936
- Died: February 8, 2013 (aged 76)
- Other names: Marv Achilles, Chuck Achilles
- Education: University of Rochester (B.A., M.S., Ed.S., Ed.D.)
- Occupations: Educational researcher, Professor, NCPEA President
- Known for: Research on class size and student achievement
- Notable work: STAR (Student Teacher Achievement Ratio) study

Charles M. "Marv" Achilles (September 9, 1936 – February 8, 2013) was an American professor and educational researcher, focused mainly student achievement, class size, and educational administration.

He was considered a leading expert on class size and its impact on student achievement. After an extensive career in education administration (he had been on faculty at the University of Tennessee, The University of North Carolina at Greensboro, Eastern Michigan University, and Seton Hall University) he died in February 2013.

== Educational Research ==
As a primary investigator for the STAR (Student Teacher Achievement Ratio) study conducted in the State of Tennessee, Dr. Achilles established the link between smaller class sizes and increased pupil performance. This study still influences educational leaders today and stands as one of the few truly quantitative, large-scale educational studies.

He served as a professor in the Seton Hall University Ed.D. program through the Seton Hall University College of Education and Human Services, Achilles was also an expert on problem analysis and research design.

He graduated with several degrees (B.A., M.S., Ed.S., Ed.D.) from the University of Rochester and is one of the notable academia on the List of University of Rochester people
