= Gordon S. Wood =

American historian (1933–2026)

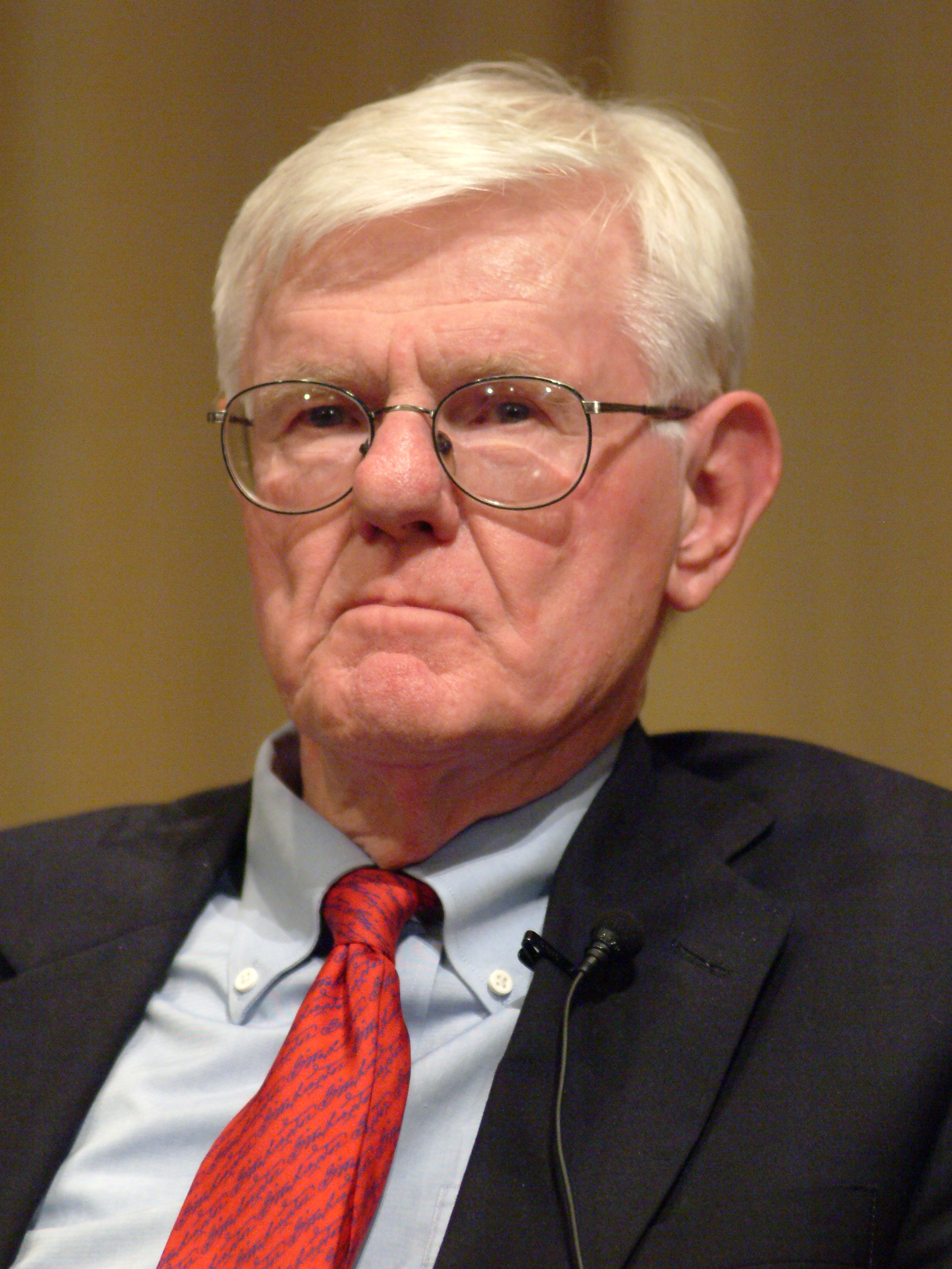
- Wood in 2008
- Born: Gordon Stewart Wood; November 27, 1933; Concord, Massachusetts, U.S.
- Died: June 7, 2026 (aged 92); Providence, Rhode Island, U.S.
- Occupations: Historian; author
- Children: 3, including Christopher
- Awards: Pulitzer Prize (1993); Bancroft Prize (1970); National Humanities Medal (2010)

Academic background
- Education: Tufts University (BA); Harvard University (MA, PhD)
- Doctoral advisor: Bernard Bailyn

Academic work
- Discipline: History
- Institutions: College of William and Mary; Harvard University; University of Michigan; Brown University; Cambridge University; Northwestern University

Gordon Stewart Wood (November 27, 1933 – June 7, 2026) was an American historian and academic who was a professor at Brown University. He was a recipient of the 1993 Pulitzer Prize for History for The Radicalism of the American Revolution (1992). His book The Creation of the American Republic, 1776–1787 (1969) won the 1970 Bancroft Prize. In 2010, he was awarded the National Humanities Medal by President Barack Obama.

== Early life and education ==
Gordon Stewart Wood was born on November 27, 1933, in Concord, Massachusetts, to Marion (Friberg) and Herbert G. Wood. He grew up in Worcester and Waltham. He graduated summa cum laude and Phi Beta Kappa from Tufts University in 1955 and served as a trustee there. While serving in the United States Air Force in Japan, he obtained a Master of Arts in history from Harvard University. After finishing his service, he obtained his Ph.D. in history from Harvard in 1964 under Bernard Bailyn. His dissertation discussed the formation of distinctive political values and structures of thought in the late colonial era of British North America and became the basis for his 1969 book, The Creation of the American Republic, 1776–1787.

== Career ==
Early in his career, Wood taught at Harvard University and the University of Michigan. In 1969, he joined the faculty of Brown University where he was Professor of History and Alva O. Way University Professor.

Wood also taught at the College of William and Mary and from 1982 to 1983 was Pitt Professor at Cambridge University. In 2026, Professor Akhil Reed Amar, a friend and associate of Wood's, called him "America's greatest living historian".

In addition to his books (listed below), Wood wrote numerous articles, notably "Rhetoric and Reality in the American Revolution" (1966), "Conspiracy and the Paranoid Style: Causality and Deceit in the Eighteenth Century" (1982), and "Interests and Disinterestedness in the Making of the Constitution" (1987). He was a frequent contributor to The New York Review of Books and The New Republic.

He wrote the third volume of the Oxford History of the United States – Empire of Liberty: A History of the Early Republic, 1789–1815 (2009) – a finalist for the Pulitzer Prize.

Contributing to the anthology Our American Story (2019), Wood addressed the possibility of a shared American narrative. He focused on the idea of equality as "the most radical and most powerful ideological force" that the American Revolution unleashed. "This powerful sense of equality is still alive and well in America, and despite all of its disturbing and unsettling consequences, it is what makes us one people." Wood was elected as a member of the American Academy of Arts and Sciences in 1988 and the American Philosophical Society in 1994.

== In popular culture ==
Speaker of the House Newt Gingrich publicly and effusively praised Wood's The Radicalism of the American Revolution (1992). Wood, who met Gingrich once in 1994, surmised that Gingrich may have approved because the book "had a kind of Tocquevillian touch to it, I guess, maybe suggesting American exceptionalism, that he liked". He jokingly described Gingrich's praise in an interview on C-SPAN in 2002 as "the kiss of death for me among a lot of academics, who are not right-wing Republicans".

Wood was mentioned in the 1997 film Good Will Hunting. In one scene, Matt Damon's character mentions Gordon Wood while standing up to a Harvard student who is ridiculing Ben Affleck's character at a bar. He accuses the Harvard student of shallowly reiterating ideas he has encountered in his coursework, telling him that soon he would be "regurgitating Gordon Wood, talking about ... the pre-Revolutionary utopia and the capital-forming effects of military mobilization". Wood said of the scene, "That's my two seconds of fame! More kids know about that than any of the books I have written."

The “Good Will Hunting” scene was later referenced in the television show It’s Always Sunny in Philadelphia, with the character Charlie trying to pull a similar rhetorical trick to Damon’s character and repeating Wood’s name several times before asking “Does no one know who Gordon Wood is?”

== Personal life and death ==
Wood married Louise Goss on April 30, 1956. They had three children, including Christopher, an art historian.

Wood died at Rhode Island Hospital in Providence, Rhode Island, on June 7, 2026, at the age of 92. He had been struck by a car in the parking lot of a Shaw's supermarket in East Providence earlier that day.

== Works ==
=== Books ===
External videos
- Booknotes interview with Wood on The American Revolution: A History, April 21, 2002, C-SPAN
- Interview with Wood on The Americanization of Benjamin Franklin, June 4, 2004, C-SPAN
- Presentation by Wood on Revolutionary Characters, May 30, 2006, C-SPAN
- After Words interview with Wood on Revolutionary Characters, July 1, 2006, C-SPAN
- Q&A interview with Wood on The Purpose of the Past, April 13, 2008, C-SPAN
- Presentation by Wood on The Purposes of the Past, September 27, 2008, C-SPAN
- Presentation by Wood on Empire of Liberty, October 7, 2009, C-SPAN
- Presentation by Wood on Empire of Liberty, September 25, 2010, C-SPAN
- Presentation by Wood on The Idea of America, May 18, 2011, C-SPAN
- Presentation by Wood on The Idea of America, November 29, 2011, C-SPAN
- Presentation by Wood on Friends Divided, November 1, 2017, C-SPAN
- Q&A interview with Wood on Friends Divided, December 17, 2017, C-SPAN

- The Creation of the American Republic, 1776–1787. Chapel Hill, North Carolina: University of North Carolina Press, 1969 and reissued 1998. (ISBN 9780807847237)
- The Radicalism of the American Revolution. New York: Alfred A. Knopf, 1992. (ISBN 978-0679736882)
- The American Revolution: A History. New York: Modern Library, 2001. (ISBN 978-0812970418)
- The Americanization of Benjamin Franklin. New York: Penguin Press, 2004. (ISBN 978-0143035282)
- Revolutionary Characters: What Made the Founders Different. New York: Penguin Press, 2006. (ISBN 978-0143112082)
- The Purpose of the Past: Reflections on the Uses of History. New York: Penguin Press, 2008. (ISBN 978-0143115045)
- Empire of Liberty: A History of the Early Republic, 1789–1815. New York: Oxford University Press, 2010. (ISBN 978-0199832460)
- The Idea of America: Reflections on the Birth of the United States. New York: Penguin, 2011. (ISBN 978-0143121244)
- Friends Divided: John Adams and Thomas Jefferson. New York: Penguin, 2017. (ISBN 978-0735224735)
- Power and Liberty: Constitutionalism in the American Revolution. New York: Oxford University Press, 2021. (ISBN 978-0197546918)

=== Pamphlets and lectures ===
- Revolution and the Political Integration of the Enslaved and Disenfranchised. Washington, DC: American Enterprise Institute, 1974. (ISBN 978-0844713045)
- The Making of the Constitution. Waco, Texas: Baylor University Press, 1987. (ISBN 978-0918954541)
- Monarchism and Republicanism in the Early United States. (Melbourne, Australia: La Trobe University, 2000.

=== Co-author ===
- (With J. R. Pole) Social Radicalism and the Idea of Equality in the American Revolution. Houston, Texas: University of St. Thomas, 1976.
- (With others) The Great Republic. Boston: Little, Brown, 1977; 4th ed.: Lexington, Massachusetts: Heath, 1992.

=== Book chapters ===
- Leadership in the American Revolution. Washington, DC: Library of Congress, 1974.
- Sally Hemings and Thomas Jefferson: History, Memory, and Civic Culture. Peter Onuf and Jan Lewis (eds.), Charlottesville, Virginia: University of Virginia Press, 1999.
- To the Best of My Ability: The American Presidency. James M. McPherson (ed.). New York: Society of American Historians, 2000.
- "Can the United States Be One People?" Our American Story. Joshua Claybourn (ed.), Lincoln, Nebraska: Potomac Books, 2019. (ISBN 978-1640121706)

=== As editor ===
- Representation in the American Revolution. Charlottesville, Virginia: University of Virginia Press, 1969. (ISBN 978-0813927220)
- The Rising Glory of America, 1760–1820. New York: George Braziller, 1971. Rev. ed.: Boston: Northeastern University Press, 1990. (ISBN 978-1555530907)
- The Confederation and the Constitution. Boston: Little, Brown, 1973.
- With Louise G. Wood. Russian-American Dialogue on the American Revolution. Columbia, Missouri: University of Missouri Press, 1995.
- With Paul A. Gilje et al. Wages of Independence: Capitalism in the Early American Republic. Rowman & Littlefield, 1997. (ISBN 978-0945612520)
- With Anthony Molho. Imagined Histories: American Historians Interpret the Past. Princeton, New Jersey: Princeton University Press, 1998. (ISBN 978-0691058115)
- John Adams: Revolutionary Writings 1755–1783 (2 vols.). New York: The Library of America, 2011. (ISBN 978-1598530902)
- The American Revolution: Writings from the Pamphlet Debate 1764–1776 (2 vols.). New York: The Library of America, 2015. (ISBN 978-1598533781)
- John Adams: Writings from the New Nation 1784–1826. New York: The Library of America, 2016. (ISBN 978-1598534665)
