= Elaine L. Larson =

American infectious disease specialist

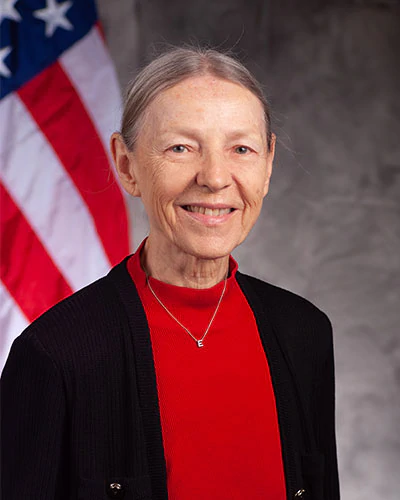
- Born: April 27, 1943 (age 83)

Academic background
- Education: BS, 1965, MS, 1969, PhD, 1981, University of Washington
- Thesis: Gram-negative bacteria on hands of hospital personnel (1981)

Elaine Lucille Larson (born April 27, 1943) is an American infectious disease specialist. As a Professor of Epidemiology at the Columbia University Mailman School of Public Health, she has published four books and more than four hundred articles on the subjects of infection prevention and control, disease epidemiology, and related issues. In 2017, Larson was named a "Living Legend" by the American Academy of Nursing, the Academy's highest honor.

== Early life and education ==
Larson was born on April 27, 1943, and became the first woman in her family to graduate from high school. She earned her Bachelor of Science degree, Master's degree, and PhD from the University of Washington. In 2004, she was the recipient of the school's Distinguished Research Award. During her time in Washington, Larson was a staff nurse at the University of Washington Medical Center in Seattle.

== Career ==
Upon completing her PhD, Larson joined the faculty at Johns Hopkins University as the M. Adelaide Nutting Chair in Clinical Nursing, and later as the Director of the Center for Nursing Research from 1985 until 1992. She later left the institution to accept a position at Georgetown University as their dean of the School of Nursing. Larson also chaired the Centers for Disease Control and Prevention Healthcare Infection Control Practices Advisory Committee from 1992 until 2000 and served as editor of the Association for Professionals in Infection Control and Epidemiology’s official scientific journal. During her tenure, she was elected to the National Academy of Medicine (NAM) and served on their Board on Health Sciences Policy from 2000 until 2003.

Larson eventually joined the faculty at Columbia University Mailman School of Public Health and received the first Pathfinder Award from the National Institute of Nursing Research in 2003. As she gained recognition as the pre-eminent expert in scientific evidence, Larson was selected to serve on the President's Committee for Gulf War Veterans' Illnesses and the National Institutes of Health Study Section on HIV Infection. She was also honored by the American Association of Critical-Care Nurses with their Pioneering Spirit Award and by the Eastern Nursing Research Society with their 2008 Distinguished Contribution to Nursing Research Award.

As a Professor of Pharmaceutical and Therapeutic Research and Associate Dean for Research at Columbia University School of Nursing, she launched the "Keep It Clean for Kids” Project (KICKS) to study hand hygiene at three New York-area child-care facilities. In recognition of her research into hand hygiene and compliance, she was the recipient of the John Stearns Medal for Distinguished Contributions in Clinical Practice from the New York Academy of Medicine. She continued with her hygenie research and received a one-year, $45,000 grant from the 3M Corporation to investigate and evaluate the effectiveness of a new rapid detection influenza test.

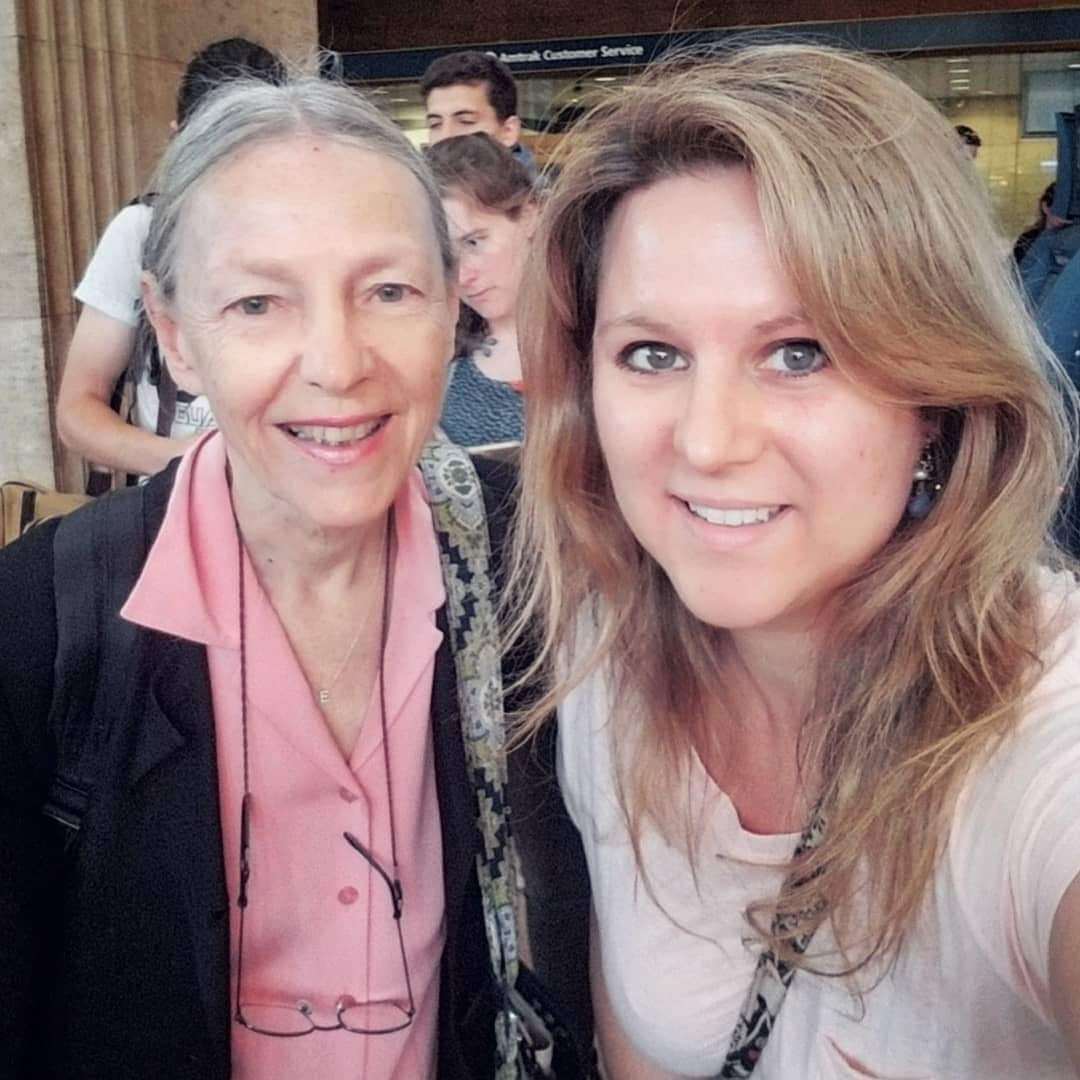
Larson with registered nurse Melody Butler in 2019

Considered a "pioneer in promoting hand hygiene for infection prevention and control," Larson was the first nurse to receive the John Stearns Medal for Distinguished Contributions in Clinical Practice from the New York Academy of Medicine. Her paper "A nursing informatics research agenda for 2008–2018: Contextual influences and key components" also received the "Most Outstanding Article in the Research Category" award from Nursing Outlook.

In recognition of her academic achievements, Larson was named a "Living Legend" by the American Academy of Nursing, the Academy's highest honor, in 2017. Her contributions were recognized to have "changed the way healthcare is delivered by emphasizing the importance of infection prevention and hand hygiene for all health professionals." The following year, Larson was honored with the Walsh McDermott Medal from the National Academy of Medicine becoming the second nurse to have ever received the award.

After serving as editor of the APIC's scientific journal for 24 years, Larson retired from her position as Editor-In-Chief in January 2019. She eventually retired from her position as Columbia University's senior associate dean for research the following year but said she had "no plans to stop contributing to the nursing profession." During the COVID-19 pandemic, Larson cautioned that the pandemic would have a lasting impact on hand-hygiene practices.

== Selected publications ==
- Infection Control (1979)
- Critical Care Nursing (1983)
- Clinical Microbiology for Nurses and Health Practitioners (1984)
- Infections and Nursing Practice: Prevention and Control (1994)
