= Paul E. Singer Foundation =

Conservative nonprofit in the United States

- Founded: 2010
- Founder: Paul Singer

The Paul E. Singer Foundation is an American private foundation founded by billionaire hedge fund manager Paul Singer. The foundation supports "American democracy, the future of Israel as a Jewish and democratic state, and Jewish continuity," along with Start-Up Nation Central. The foundation additionally supports LGBT rights.

== History ==
In November 2018, the foundation announced it would donate $1 million to Jewish institutions around New York following the Tree of Life Synagogue attack in Pittsburgh.

In 2024, the foundation gave $100,000 to the Hudson Institute, a conservative think tank that has shared personnel with both the foundation and Singer's investment company.

In October 2025, The Washington Post reported the foundation was among the donors to the White House ballroom, committing to donate $5 million in October 2025. In November 2025, Singer's hedge fund received court approval for purchasing Venezuelan oil company Citgo for $5.9 billion.
