= Paul Singer =

American businessman (born 1944)

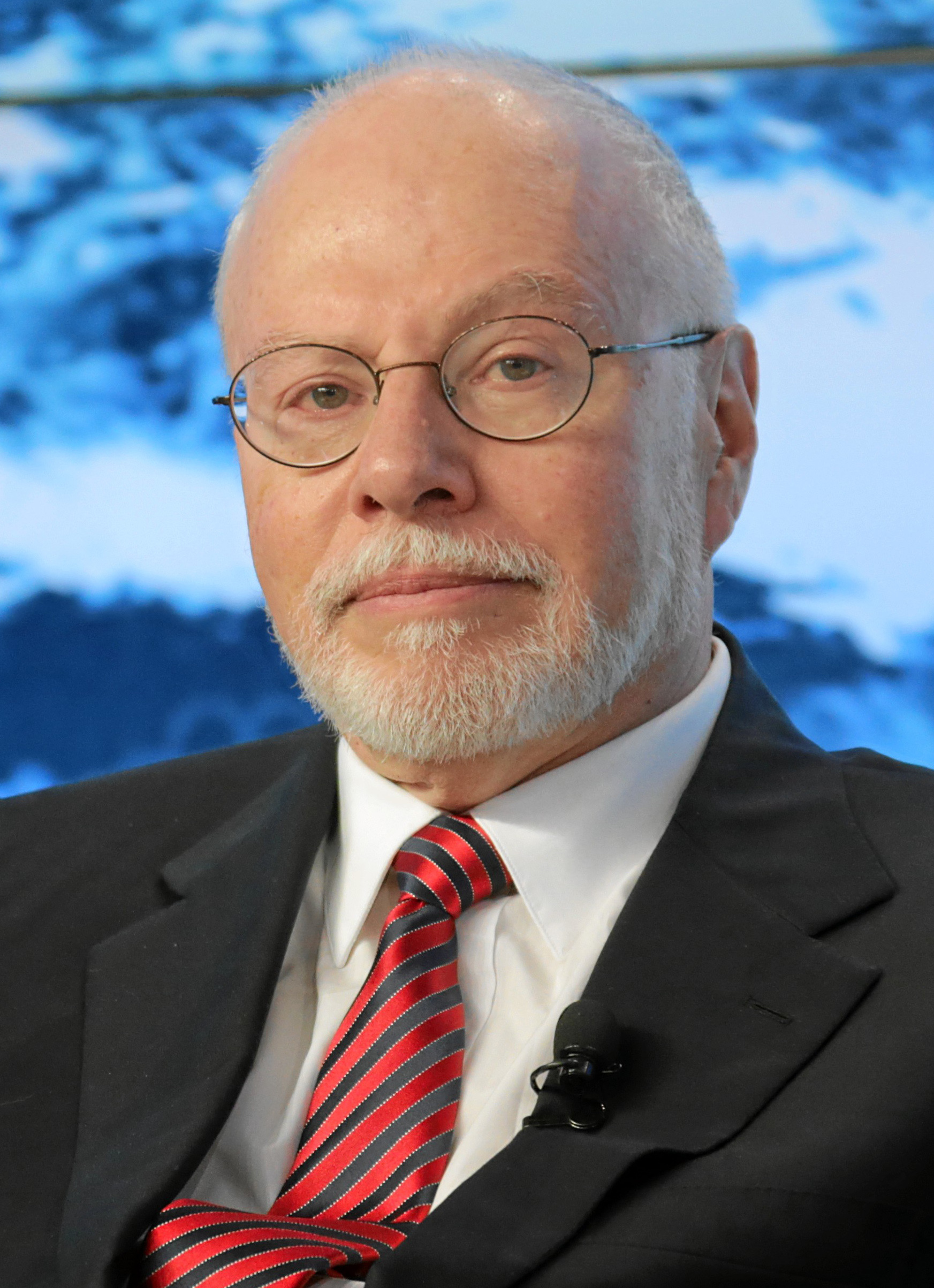
- Singer in 2013
- Born: Paul Elliott Singer; August 22, 1944 (age 82); Teaneck, New Jersey, U.S.
- Education: University of Rochester (BS); Harvard University (JD)
- Known for: Founder, president, co-CEO, and co-CIO of Elliott Management
- Political party: Republican
- Children: 2, including Gordon Singer

Paul Elliott Singer (born August 22, 1944) is an American hedge fund manager, activist investor, and the founder, president, and co-CEO of Elliott Management. As of September 2025, Forbes estimated his net worth at US$6.7 billion. Fortune described Singer as one of the "smartest and toughest money managers" in the hedge fund industry. A number of sources have branded him a vulture capitalist, largely on account of his role at Elliott Management, which is a vulture fund. The Independent has described him as "a pioneer in the business of buying up sovereign bonds on the cheap, and then going after countries for unpaid debts".

Singer's Elliott Management has focused on activist campaigns, in which they take an equity stake in a company and agitate using influence and voting rights to encourage change, and they have also expanded into private equity. Singer's political activities include financial support for LGBTQ rights. He has provided funding to the Manhattan Institute for Policy Research, is a strong opponent of raising taxes for the wealthiest 1 percent of taxpayers, such as himself, and opposes aspects of the Dodd-Frank Act. Singer is active in Republican Party politics, and he and others affiliated with Elliott Management are collectively "the top source of contributions" to the National Republican Senatorial Committee. Singer is a supporter of Israel and has donated to pro-Israel causes.

== Biography ==
Singer was born in 1944 and grew up in Teaneck, New Jersey, in a Jewish family, one of three children of a Manhattan pharmacist and a homemaker. He graduated from Teaneck High School as part of the class of 1962. He graduated from the University of Rochester with a B.S. in psychology in 1966 before receiving a J.D. from Harvard Law School in 1969.

=== Career ===
In 1974, Singer went to work as an attorney in the real estate division of the investment bank Donaldson, Lufkin & Jenrette.

==== Elliott Management ====
In 1977, with a convertible arbitrage "winning formula", Singer left law to create his own investment company. He founded the hedge fund Elliott Associates L.P. with US$1.3 million in seed capital from various friends and family members. According to The Telegraph in 2011, Elliott is "one of the oldest hedge funds on Wall Street". Singer is also the founder and CEO of NML Capital Limited, a Cayman Islands-based offshore unit of Elliott Management.

Singer was involved in most of the big restructurings after the 2008 financial crisis. In 2009 The Guardian reported that Singer "through a brilliantly complex financial manoeuvre, took control of Delphi Automotive, the sole supplier of most of the auto parts needed by General Motors and Chrysler". Ultimately, the US Treasury paid Elliott Management "$12.9 billion in cash and subsidies from the US Treasury's auto bailout fund". In December 2011 Elliott Associates sued Vietnam's state-owned shipbuilder Vinashin in the UK for defaulting the year before on a US$600 million syndicated loan.

In February 2014, Singer controlled $23 billion (£19 billion) of funds and was the ninth largest investor on Wall Street. In June 2015, Singer was an active activist investor with Citrix Systems, pushing for various changes. In May 2014 the French Financial Markets Regulator fined Elliott a record €14 million ($22 million) for insider trading, a ruling which the company appealed.

In 2015, as part of a long-standing dispute between Singer and members of the Lee family over a merger between Samsung and Cheil Industries, Samsung published numerous cartoons of Singer as an anthropomorphic vulture on its corporate website. The cartoons were denounced by Singer and others as antisemitic. Samsung responded several days later denouncing antisemitism, and pulled the images from their website.

== Net worth ==
Forbes rated Singer's net worth as $2.1 billion in 2015, and $2.2 billion in 2016. As of November 2015, Elliott Management Corporation oversees Elliott Associates and Elliott International Limited, which together have more than $27 billion in assets under management in a "multi-strategy fund". The corporation includes a private equity division. Termed a "specialist in activism in technology companies" by The Wall Street Journal in June 2015, Elliott Management's varied portfolio also includes a prominent tech component. The company pursued "more than 40 campaigns aimed at tech companies" between 2004 and 2015, according to Reuters.

== COVID-19 ==
On 1 February 2020, several weeks before many Americans had heard of COVID-19, Singer wrote a memo to his employees about preparing for the possibility of being quarantined for at least a month due to the virus.

== Activist investment ==
After Elliott Management took a stake in Twitter, Singer pushed to oust Jack Dorsey and control four seats on the board after Dorsey announced he would move to Africa. A deal was reached that gave Elliott Management a seat on the board and left Dorsey as CEO.

=== Sovereign debt ===
Singer is a vulture capitalist because of Elliott Management Corporation's investments in distressed debt. In the early 1990s, Singer began using the strategy of purchasing sovereign debt from nations in or near default, such as Argentina, and Peru, through his NML Capital Limited, and Republic of the Congo through Kensington International Inc. Singer's practice of purchasing distressed debt from companies and sovereign states and pursuing full payment through the courts has led to criticism. Singer and EMC defend their model, saying it is "a fight against charlatans who refuse to play by the market's rules", and supporters of the practice have said it "help[s] keep kleptocratic governments in check". In 1996, Elliott bought defaulted Peruvian debt for $11.4 million. Elliott won a $58 million judgment and Peru had to repay the sum in full under the pari passu rule. When former president of Peru Alberto Fujimori was attempting to flee the country due to human rights abuses and corruption, Singer confiscated his jet and offered to let him leave the country in exchange for the $58 million payment from the treasury. Fujimori accepted. In the 1990s the Kensington International division of EMC purchased US$30 million (£18m) of "Congolese sovereign debt... allegedly for less than $20m". Kensington subsequently spent years trying to be paid in full through the courts. In 2008 Kensington and the Republic of Congo settled for an undisclosed amount.

After Argentina defaulted on its debt in 2002, the Elliott-owned company NML Capital Limited refused to accept the Argentine offer to pay less than 30 cents per dollar of debt. Elliott sued Argentina for the debt's value, and the lower UK courts found that Argentina had state immunity. Elliott successfully appealed the case to the UK Supreme Court, which ruled that Elliott had the right to attempt to seize Argentine property in the United Kingdom, and on October 2, 2012, Singer arranged for a Ghanaian Court order to detain an Argentine naval vessel in a Ghanaian port in an effort to force Argentina to pay the debt, but was rebuffed when the seizure was barred by the International Tribunal for the Law of the Sea. In February 2013, the U.S. appeals court heard Argentina's appeal in the case of its default and debt to NML. In March 2013 Argentina offered a new plan, which was dismissed first by the lower courts and then the United States Court of Appeals for the Second Circuit on August 23, 2013, and then again in June 2014 in the U.S. Supreme Court. In March 2014 NML Capital unsuccessfully attempted to satisfy court awards by suing SpaceX, seeking the rights to two satellite-launch contracts bought by Argentina valued at $113 million. In early 2016, US courts ruled that Argentina must make full payments to holdout bondholders by February 29. In February 2016 Argentina reached an agreement with Singer.

=== Business and investment model ===
According to Fortune, Singer focused from early times "on distressed assets", buying up bankrupt firms' debt and acquiring "a reputation for strong-arming his way to profit". Fortune noted in 2012 that losses sustained early in Singer's career led to a "risk aversion that still guides his investing today. Thanks to his caution, by 2012 Elliott had "only two down years" since 1977, rising "4.2% in 2011, a year in which most hedge funds lost money". Describing him as "one of the smartest and toughest money managers in the business", the article further notes that his firm "is so influential that fear of its tactics helped shape the current 2012 Greek debt restructuring".

Elliott was termed by The Independent as "a pioneer in the business of buying up sovereign bonds on the cheap, and then going after countries for unpaid debts". Singer describes his business model as "a fight against charlatans who refuse to play by the market's rules", and in 2013 told Alpha Magazine that "we've made the point over and over again that sovereigns that could pay their debts and choose not to may be attempting to save some money but are harming their people and their economies by making investing in their countries more risky and more problematic and by discouraging foreign investment." In response, The Washington Post wrote in 2014 that "in Singer's view, he isn't just forcing indebted companies and countries to pay up. He's trying to create a world where distressed debt doesn't exist. Depending on your own views, that makes Singer an activist investor, or a 'vulture capitalist.'"

=== AC Milan ===
In July 2018, Singer became the owner of Italian football club AC Milan after the previous owner defaulted on a $37 million loan payment owed to Singer's hedge fund company. Elliott had loaned $400 million to the previous owner to help him purchase the club, which plays in Italy's top football league, Serie A. Although the company had been expected to sell the club and entertained negotiations, Singer eventually stated that Elliott planned to return AC Milan "to the pantheon of top European football clubs where it rightly belongs" and to inject $66 million to "stabilize the club's finances" and "fund AC Milan's transformation". However, on 1 June 2022, RedBird Capital Partners agreed to acquire AC Milan for $1.3 billion, with Elliott retaining a minority stake.

== Philanthropy ==
Singer signed The Giving Pledge, which signals a commitment by individuals to donate more than half of their wealth within their lifetime to address society's "most difficult moral and economic challenges". Singer founded the Paul E. Singer Family Foundation, which supports charitable causes including the Harvard Graduate School of Education Singer Prize for Excellence in Secondary Teaching, VH1 Save The Music Foundation, and MarineParents.com.

Singer and the Paul E. Singer Family Foundation are behind The Philos Project, a pro-Israel Christian organization. In 2016 Singer partnered with the Museum of the Bible to fund Passages Israel, a program to take college students to Israel. In November 2018, after the Pittsburgh synagogue shooting, the Paul E. Singer Family Foundation announced it would donate $1 million to upgrade security at Jewish institutions in New York. The funds will be given to the United Jewish Appeal – Federation of New York.

== Political activity ==
Singer is an active participant in Republican Party politics. He is a "self-proclaimed conservative libertarian". According to The New York Times, he supports "like-minded candidates who often share his distaste for what they view as governmental over-meddling in the financial industry". Singer has contributed more than $1 million to the political efforts of the Koch brothers. He is a "longtime supporter of hawkish pro-Israel causes" and a major funder of the conservative think tank Foundation for Defense of Democracies. In 2014, Singer led a group of major Republican donors to form the American Opportunity Alliance, a group that brings together wealthy Republican donors who share Singer's support for LGBTQ rights, immigration reform and Israel.

Singer was a major contributor to George W. Bush's presidential campaigns. On March 14, 2008, Singer hosted a Republican National Committee luncheon in his home for 70 guests that raised $1.4 million for Bush. Bush appointed Singer to serve on the Honorary Delegation to accompany him to Jerusalem for the celebration of the 60th anniversary of the State of Israel in May 2008.

In 2007, Singer was one of the most important fundraisers in Rudy Giuliani 2008 presidential campaign. That same year, Singer led a financial industry fund-raising effort for Rudy Giuliani, first as regional finance chair and later as senior policy adviser. Singer lent Giuliani his private jet. That same year, Singer served as the sole contributor to a campaign to support a petition drive for a proposed California initiative to apportion the state's 55 electoral votes by congressional district donating $175,000. At least 19 of the state's 53 congressional districts were expected to vote for a GOP presidential candidate, enough to change the national results in a close election.

Singer gave Supreme Court justice Samuel Alito free private jet travel from all across the country to Alaska, where a group including Alito and Singer went fishing in 2008. In 2014, Alito voted with six other colleagues in Republic of Argentina v. NML Capital, Ltd. brought by Singer's companies after Argentinian debt was bought up. Alito never recused himself.

Singer was one of the largest donors during the 2010 U.S. midterm elections, contributing more than $4 million to support Republican candidates. In 2011, Singer donated $1 million to Restore Our Future, a Super PAC created to support Mitt Romney in the 2012 U.S. presidential election. In 2013, Singer gave $100,000 to the Club for Growth, a 501(c)4 organization that supports Tea Party candidates.

Singer has also donated millions of dollars to organizations that advocate for a strong military and for supporting Israel. In 2012, Singer founded the nonprofit Start-up Nation Central, a Tel Aviv-based NGO that seeks to develop collaboration between Israel's tech sector and outside investors. Singer has invested around $20 million into Start-Up Nation Central.

In 2015, the Washington Free Beacon, largely funded by Singer, hired Fusion GPS to unearth damaging information on Republican candidates for the office of President of the United States. This research was later used by the Hillary Clinton 2016 presidential campaign and became the infamous Steele Dossier.

During the 2016 U.S. presidential election campaign, Singer supported Marco Rubio and donated a million dollars in March to the Our Principles PAC, a Stop Trump movement PAC attempting to derail Donald Trump's election campaign. He also started the American Unity PAC. He supported Trump's 2016 inaugural committee with $1 million together with 25 other billionaires. In 2024, he donated $5 million to Trump's re-election campaign.

During the New York's 19th congressional district 2016 election, Singer donated $500,000 to a PAC supporting John Faso, a Congressional candidate in New York's 19th congressional district who ran in opposition to progressive candidate and Wall Street critic Zephyr Teachout. Teachout responded to the donation by challenging Singer to come to the district and debate her.

As of August 2026, Singer spent $37.5 million in political contributions in the 2026 United States elections, including $14,500,000 to the Senate Leadership Fund and $8,000,000 to the Congressional Leadership Fund.

Singer is a member of the Committee on Capital Markets Regulation, a non-governmental, nonpartisan research organization. He is chairman of the board of trustees for the Manhattan Institute for Policy Research, a conservative think tank in New York City, and on the board of directors of the Republican Jewish Coalition, a political lobbying group in the United States that promotes Jewish Republicans. He also served on the board of directors for the Jewish Institute for National Security Affairs.

=== LGBTQ rights ===
As well as contributing to private initiatives, Singer also actively seeks to persuade other Republicans to support gay marriage. He has joined other Wall Street executives in support of LGBT equality and stated that same-sex marriage promotes "family stability" and that in a time when "the institution of marriage in America has utterly collapsed", the fact that gay couples want to marry "is kind of a lovely thing and a cool thing and a wonderful thing".

Singer, whose son Andrew married his husband Corey Morris in a same-sex marriage in Massachusetts in 2009, has also financially supported the legalization of gay marriage in New York, as well as in Maryland. In 2011, this advocacy included supporting legislation allowing same-sex marriage in the state of New York. In 2012, Singer provided $1 million to start a Political Action Committee named American Unity PAC. According to the New York Times, the PAC's "sole mission will be to encourage Republican candidates to support same-sex marriage, in part by helping them to feel financially shielded from any blowback from well-funded groups that oppose it". In 2014 Singer urged Republicans to pass the Employment Non-Discrimination Act. This bill requires workplace protections to extend to the LGBT community. As of June 2014 Singer had donated an estimated $10 million to the gay rights movement. Singer also funded the American Unity Fund.

In 2015, Singer, Tim Gill, and Daniel Loeb helped fund Freedom For All Americans to promote LGBT issues in states and local communities in the United States.

== Writings and commentary ==
Singer has written columns in The Wall Street Journal. In 2009 he wrote "Free-Marketeers Should Welcome Some Regulation", a column in which he argued: "It's true that monetary policy was too lax for too long, and the government encouraged lending to people who were unlikely to repay their loans. But this crisis was primarily caused by managements and individuals throughout the financial system who exercised extremely poor judgement. The private sector, not the public sector, is where the biggest mistakes were made." Among other topics, he has written against raising taxes for the wealthiest taxpayers ("the 1%") and aspects of the Dodd-Frank Act.

At a September 2006 financial conference in New York City, Singer delivered a speech called "Complexity Made Simple", advising that the purchase of collateralized debt obligations (CDOs) was a serious mistake and anticipating the downturn of the housing market by nearly a year before the $770 billion taxpayer-funded bailout. Hedge fund manager Jim Chanos said in an August 2009 radio interview that he and Singer had met with G7 finance ministers in 2007 to warn them that the global financial system was increasingly unstable and approaching a catastrophe, with banks on the verge of sinking the global economy. The pair argued that decisive action was called for, but Chanos claims they were met with indifference.

== Personal life ==
In 2020, Singer ranked 222 on the Forbes 400 list of the richest Americans, 538 among the world's billionaires, and the 19th highest earning hedge fund manager. He has two sons, Andrew and Gordon. After Andrew came out as gay, Singer said he reacted "with fear and nervousness, I worried about the health aspects ... grandfatherhood" but eventually became a steadfast supporter of gay rights. In 2012, he launched the American Unity PAC, which aims to persuade fellow conservatives to support same-sex marriage. He has actively supported same-sex marriage campaigns and makes large donations to LGBT groups. Gordon Singer is co-managing partner at Elliott and runs its London office.

Singer lives on New York City's Upper West Side and has a house in Aspen, Colorado. He began studying classical piano at the age of 10 and formed a family band with one son on guitar, another on drums, and his son-in-law on saxophone. He enjoys Led Zeppelin and has played onstage with Meat Loaf.

In 2017, Singer received an honorary doctorate from the University of Rochester.

== See also ==
- List of University of Rochester people
- List of Harvard Law School alumni
- List of libertarians in the United States
- 50 Most Influential (Bloomberg Markets ranking)
