= Feddersen =

Feddersen is a surname. Notable people with the surname include:

- Berend Wilhelm Feddersen (1832–1918), German physicist
- Ditlevine Feddersen (1727–1803), Norwegian poet and translator
- Helga Feddersen (1930–1990), German actress, comedian and writer
- Joe Feddersen (born 1953), American artist
- Timothy Feddersen (born 1958), American economist and political scientist
- Victor Feddersen (born 1968), Danish rower
