= Patricia Stone =

American nurse

Academic background
- Education: RN, University at Albany, SUNY; MS, Syracuse University; MPH, Harvard University; PhD, 1997, University of Rochester
- Thesis: Models of delivery of prenatal and childbirth care (1997)

Academic work
- Institutions: Columbia University School of Nursing
- Main interests: nursing homes

Patricia Williams Stone is an American nurse. During the COVID-19 pandemic, Stone was elected to the National Academy of Medicine for her "expertise and sustained scholarly efforts in real-world comparative and economic evaluations of improving the quality of care and specifically preventing health care-associated infections."

== Early life and education ==
Stone completed her registered nurse designation at the University at Albany, SUNY. She received a master of science from Syracuse University and a Master of Public Health at Harvard University. She then completed her PhD at the University of Rochester.

== Career ==
During the COVID-19 pandemic, Stone and colleagues Sonia Y. Angell, Andrea Baccarelli, Wendy Chung, and Kam W. Leong were elected to the National Academy of Medicine. She was elected due to her "expertise and sustained scholarly efforts in real-world comparative and economic evaluations of improving the quality of care and specifically preventing health care-associated infections." She was also named to the Mitre Corporation's 25-member independent Coronavirus Commission for Safety and Quality in Nursing Homes. In 2021, Stone officially stepped up as editor in chief of the American Journal of Infection Control following the retirement of Elaine Larson.
