= American Journal of Infection Control =

- Discipline: Microbiology
- Language: English
- Edited by: Patricia Stone

Publication details
- History: 1966–present
- Publisher: Elsevier

Standard abbreviations
- ISO 4: Am. J. Infect. Control

Indexing
- ISSN: 0196-6553

Links
- Journal homepage

The American Journal of Infection Control is a peer-reviewed scientific journal published by Elsevier on behalf of the Association for Professionals in Infection Control and Epidemiology. The journal publishes articles describing original research on the epidemiology, infection control, and infectious diseases. According to the 2020 Journal Citation Reports, the journal has a 2023 impact factor of 4.9.

The journal was established in 1966 and the editor-in-chief is Patricia Stone (Columbia University).
