= Nancy McGlen =

American political scientist

- Education: Ithaca College; University of Rochester
- Scientific career
- Fields: Political science; Women's studies
- Workplaces: University at Buffalo; Niagara University

Nancy E. McGlen is an American political scientist and women's studies scholar. She is professor emerita at Niagara University, where she has also been the Dean of the College of Arts and Sciences. Her research focuses on women and politics in the United States.

== Education and academic positions ==
McGlen grew up in Hannibal, New York. She attended Ithaca College, graduating with a B.A. degree in government in 1969. In the third year of her studies, she was elected the chair of the student congress, making her the first female chair of that student body. McGlen then attended the University of Rochester, where she obtained an M.A. in political science followed by a PhD in political science in 1975.

McGlen joined the political science faculty of the University at Buffalo in 1974, where she also taught courses on women and politics. She became a professor at Niagara University in 1980. McGlen helped to establish the Women's Studies program at Niagara University. She also became the director of the social science program and Dean of the College of Arts and Sciences.

== Research ==
In addition to dozens of chapters and academic journal articles, McGlen published three books on the topic of women and politics in the United States. In 1983, she coauthored Women's rights: The struggle for equality in the nineteenth and twentieth centuries with Karen O'Connor. Women's rights is a political history and analysis of the American women's movement, from the Seneca Falls Convention through the movement for women's suffrage until the late 20th century.

In 1993, McGlen published Women in foreign policy: The insiders, written with Meredith Reid Sarkees. In Women in foreign policy, McGlen and Sarkees use 79 interviews with men and women in the United States Department of State and the United States Department of Defense, including several of the most prominent women in those organizations, to understand the role of women policymakers and bureaucrats in the foreign policy of the Ronald Reagan administration. They focus on the differences between the women and the men who worked in this area, and the effect of women policy-makers on American foreign policy during this era.

In 1995, McGlen coauthored Women, politics, and American society with Karen O'Connor, which is an overview of women and American politics. The book had been published in 5 editions by 2020.

In 2009, McGlen was inducted into the Western New York Women's Hall of Fame at Buffalo State College. She retired in 2013, after 33 years at Niagara University.

McGlen is distantly related to Belva Ann Lockwood.

== Selected works ==
- Women's rights: The struggle for equality in the nineteenth and twentieth centuries, with Karen O'Connor (1983)
- Women in foreign policy: The insiders, with Meredith Reid Sarkees (1993)
- Women, politics, and American society, with Karen O'Connor (1995)
