= Guy Wyser-Pratte =

American financial investor, risk arbitrageur, and shareholder activist

- Born: Guy Patrick Wyser-Pratte; June 21, 1940 (age 86); Vichy, France
- Education: University of Rochester (BA); New York University (MBA)
- Military career
- Allegiance: United States
- Branch: United States Marine Corps
- Service years: 1962–1966
- Rank: Captain

Guy Patrick Wyser-Pratte (born June 21, 1940 in Vichy, France) is a Franco-American financial investor, risk arbitrageur and shareholder activist. He joined the Marine Corps before eventually moving into finance. He is the head of New York-based Wyser-Pratte & Co., an investment fund with some $500 million in assets under management founded in 1991, focused on "undervalued European equities." He previously headed the Arbitrage Department at Bache & Company and its successor Prudential-Bache Securities from 1971 to 1991.

Wyser-Pratte is regarded as one of the pioneers of modern shareholder activism and among the first American activist investors to operate in Continental Europe. Over a career spanning six decades, he has conducted more than 100 activist campaigns across ten jurisdictions. In 1977, Fortune magazine identified him as one of the "Four Horsemen" of arbitrage, alongside Ivan Boesky, Robert Rubin, and Richard Rosenthal of Salomon Brothers. He is credited with inventing the shareholder rights bylaw and, through a 1998 agreement with Pennzoil, creating the "chewable" poison pill, a shareholder-friendly variant of the antitakeover defense.

He is the author of Risk Arbitrage, first published in 1971 and derived from his New York University MBA thesis, which became a standard textbook in the field and earned him the sobriquet "dean of the arbitrage community"; the book was updated and republished by John Wiley & Sons in 2009. He is a Lifetime Member of the Council on Foreign Relations and served as a commissioned officer in the United States Marine Corps, attaining the rank of captain. A 2007 London Business School study described him as Europe's most "active activist," and a 2019 study in the International Journal of Entrepreneurial Venturing analyzed the market impact of his Continental European campaigns.

== Early life and education ==
Wyser-Pratte was born in Vichy, France, in June 1940, weeks after the German invasion of France, to Eugène Wyser-Pratte, a Budapest-born banker and arbitrageur who had made his career on the Paris Bourse, and his wife, Marguerite. During the Second World War, the family lived in southern France before fleeing across the Swiss border near Menthon-Saint-Bernard. After the Liberation, the family emigrated to the United States, arriving in March 1946 and passing through Ellis Island.

Wyser-Pratte holds an M.B.A. in finance from New York University and a B.A. in history from the University of Rochester. He wrote the authoritative text on risk arbitrage. He penned Risk Arbitrage and Risk Arbitrage II, monographs published by the New York University Salomon Brothers Center that became standard textbooks in the field; Risk Arbitrage was updated and republished by John Wiley & Sons in 2009.

== Business career ==
=== Family firm and Bache & Company (1966–1991) ===
Wyser-Pratte & Co. traces its origins to Paris, where Eugène Wyser-Pratte — born in Budapest, educated in Europe, and a banker in Paris — opened an arbitrage office in the late 1920s. After the Second World War he brought his family to the United States and established the firm on Wall Street, heading it for twenty years — a move his son later summarized to The New York Times: "My father saw a good arbitrage situation and we stayed." In 1967 the family business was merged into Bache & Company, where Eugene presided over the firm's risk arbitrage activities — a combination the younger Wyser-Pratte later said he favored chiefly because it gave them greater "striking power" in arbitrage. Three years later he completed his New York University M.B.A., writing his master's thesis on risk arbitrage.

Eugène Wyser-Pratte retired in 1971 as manager of the firm's risk arbitrage department, and his son was appointed head of the operation. By July 1971, The New York Times identified the younger Wyser-Pratte as vice president in charge of arbitrage at Bache, reporting that the firm was studying 50 to 60 potential arbitrage situations at any given time and was active in 20 to 30, ranking among the leading arbitrage houses on Wall Street. He headed the firm's arbitrage operations for two decades, through its evolution into Prudential-Bache Securities. Compensated on a percentage of the arbitrage profits he generated, he became the firm's highest-paid officer: the Times reported in 1975 that the 35-year-old senior vice president had earned $502,812 in fiscal 1975 — more than double the $217,000 earned by chairman John E. Leslie — and that in fiscal 1974 his $326,100 in compensation had exceeded not only Leslie's pay but the entire firm's net earnings of $257,000 for the year. He told the Times that his father had taught him how to take risks, but that he had not understood the weight of the pressure until he experienced it himself.

In October 1977, Fortune profiled Wyser-Pratte, then thirty-seven, as one of the "Four Horsemen" — with Ivan Boesky of Ivan F. Boesky & Co., Robert Rubin of Goldman Sachs (later U.S. Treasury Secretary), and Richard Rosenthal of Salomon Brothers — described as the acknowledged leaders of the younger generation of arbitrageurs. The magazine reported that the four collectively netted approximately $30 million during the 1977 takeover battle for Babcock & Wilcox between United Technologies and J. Ray McDermott & Co., in what it judged possibly the largest arbitrage profits ever realized on a single corporate deal to that time. Wyser-Pratte's Babcock position was reported as the largest Bache had ever taken in arbitrage, on which the firm cleared roughly $15 a share.

While at Bache, Wyser-Pratte began publicly confronting managements he considered to be entrenching themselves at shareholders' expense — an early form of the shareholder activism he would later practice as an independent investor. In September 1977, when Gerber Products defeated a $40-a-share, $325 million tender offer from Anderson, Clayton & Co. through five months of litigation — leaving the stock at $28.25, below its price before the offer was made — Wyser-Pratte emerged as an unofficial spokesman for brokers holding an estimated 500,000 Gerber shares. He accused Gerber's management of "cavalier treatment of stockholders" and predicted that, as stockholders' class-action suits seeking at least $100 million in damages were adjudicated, the company's officers might come to realize they had won the battle but lost the war; his own firm, Bache Halsey Stuart Shields, was among the stockholders pursuing damages.

In January 1991 he left Prudential-Bache, and in February 1991 he re-established the family firm as Wyser-Pratte & Co.

In 2010, Wyser-Pratte tried to take control of Lagardere but he failed because of the opposition of the majority of shareholders.

=== Wyser-Pratte & Co. and U.S. activism (1991–present) ===
As an independent investment manager, Wyser-Pratte shifted his focus from classical arbitrage to shareholder activism. His investment approach concentrates on undervalued, publicly listed companies — frequently conglomerates in industrial and defense sectors — in which he typically acquires a stake of under five percent and uses proxy contests, public advocacy, and board engagement to press for governance changes and value realization.

Wyser-Pratte is credited with inventing and promoting the shareholder rights bylaw, a corporate governance mechanism that nullifies a target company's poison pill when a fully financed, all-cash offer is made for all of a company's shares at a substantial premium, thereby shifting the decision to accept an outside bid from management to shareholders. Following Pennzoil's use of its poison pill to rebuff a takeover offer from Union Pacific Resources in 1997 — a bid shareholders had overwhelmingly supported — Wyser-Pratte pressed a shareholder rights bylaw proposal at the company. On April 6, 1998, facing the risk of losing the shareholder vote, Pennzoil's management reached an agreement with Wyser-Pratte to incorporate the bylaw's essential elements into its existing pill, creating what became known as the "chewable" poison pill; writing in The Wall Street Journal, the corporate law scholar Jonathan R. Macey described the innovation as a precedent that transformed the poison pill into a pro-shareholder device, and identified Wyser-Pratte as an "arbitrageur and corporate governance expert." He pursued similar campaigns at Wallace Computer Services and Rexene.

=== European campaigns ===
Beginning in the early 1990s, Wyser-Pratte became one of the first American activist investors to operate in Continental Europe, at a time when confrontational shareholder engagement was virtually unknown in French and German markets. His stated objective was to import Anglo-American standards of corporate governance and shareholder democracy to European companies.

== Books and publications ==
- Risk Arbitrage (New York University Graduate School of Business Administration, 1971; monograph derived from his MBA thesis)
- Risk Arbitrage II (New York University Salomon Brothers Center monograph series, 1982)
- Risk Arbitrage (updated edition, Wiley Investment Classics, John Wiley & Sons, 2009, ISBN 978-0-470-41571-9)

Wyser-Pratte's 1971 monograph, an 88-page publication of the New York University Graduate School of Business Administration that evolved from his master's thesis, was credited by The New York Times with lifting the curtain of secrecy on the arbitrage profession; in its preface, Wyser-Pratte wrote that too much about the activity of arbitrageurs had been needlessly hidden from the investing public for too long. At the time of the 1977 Fortune profile, his monograph was described as the only publication available on risk arbitrage.
