= Association for Professionals in Infection Control and Epidemiology =

The Association for Professionals in Infection Control and Epidemiology (APIC) is a private nonprofit professional organization based in Arlington, VA for healthcare practitioners dedicated to the principles of infection control. APIC has more than 15,000 members. APIC concentrates its efforts in the hospital, nursing home and home health settings.

== Overview ==
APIC strives to limit the cause and spread of hospital-acquired (HAIs) infections by:

- Collection, and analysis of healthcare data to monitor hospital-acquired infection trends, to plan interventions with other established public health agencies.
- Prevention of nosocomial infections by identifying sources of infections and stopping their transmission.
- Creation of scientifically valid infection prevention and control techniques for all healthcare personnel.
- Establishing education programs for healthcare personnel and the public in the field of infectious diseases.

APIC has a central office governed by an elected board of directors comprising four officers and nine to 12 directors. In addition, APIC has 124 regional chapters across the United States. Each chapter has their own elected officers and volunteers. Moreover, APIC offers a selection of areas of infection control concentration called sections. APIC also offers awards every year to healthcare practitioners who have been recognized as leaders in infection control advancement.

APIC publishes magazines, journals (including American Journal of Infection Control), articles, and case studies.
