= E. Sandra Byers =

Canadian psychologist and sex researcher

- Born: November 9, 1951 (age 74); Montreal, Quebec, Canada

Academic background
- Education: B.A., 1973, Psychology, University of Rochester; MA., PhD., Clinical Psychology, 1978, West Virginia University
- Thesis: Counselor skill-training in a year-round therapeutic wilderness camp: Effect on camper and counselor behaviors during problem solving sessions (1978)

Elaine Sandra Byers FRSC (born November 9, 1951) is a Canadian psychologist, sex researcher, educator and therapist. As a faculty member of psychology at the University of New Brunswick, she established the Muriel McQueen Fergusson Centre for Family Violence.

== Early life and education ==
Byers was born on November 9, 1951, in Montreal, Quebec. She attended West Virginia University for her Master's degree and PhD. Her PhD thesis was titled "Counselor Skill-Training in a Year-Round Therapeutic Wilderness Camp: Effect on Camper and Counselor Behaviors during Problem Solving Sessions."

== Career ==
After graduating from the West Virginia University, she joined the faculty of University of New Brunswick (UNB) and established their first human sexuality course in the Department of Psychology. One of her first research projects at UNB was to study stroke survivors opinions on sexual activities. She later became the founding director of the University's Muriel McQueen Fergusson Centre for Family Violence and co-edited "Sexual Coercion in Dating Relationships." By 2003, she was elected Chair of the psychology department at UNB.

In 2004, Byers and S. Andrea Miller conducted a study published in the Journal of Sex Research that concluded men in heterosexual relationships were often dissatisfied with the length of foreplay and intercourse. Two years later, Byers was named a University Research Scholar by UNB for her contributions to the study of human sexuality, sexual health and intimate partner relationships.

In 2013, Byers was awarded the Alfred C. Kinsey Award by the Society for the Scientific Study of Sexuality. Later, Byers, Kaitlyn Goldsmith and Amanda Miller concluded that out of 107 men and 102 women, only 30 percent would choose to live life as the opposite gender. Byers' analysis of the results was that sexist beliefs and stereotypes played a role in the participants' answers. In 2018, she was elected a Fellow of the Royal Society of Canada and recognized by the Canadian Sexual Research Forum with an Outstanding Contribution Award.
