= Frank Shuffelton =

American scholar of American literature

Frank Shuffelton (died March 4, 2010) was an American scholar of American literature, who taught at the University of Rochester from 1969 to his retirement in 2007. His expertise was the American Enlightenment; he published a monograph on Thomas Hooker and bibliographical books on Thomas Jefferson, whose Notes on the State of Virginia he edited.

== Biography ==
Shuffelton received an undergraduate degree from Harvard University and did his doctorate at Stanford University. He spent his entire academic career at the University of Rochester, beginning in 1969, teaching American literature of the 17th through 19th centuries. He retired in 2007, as an emeritus. Shuffelton was chair of Rochester's English Department (2003-2007) and directed its composition program (1997-2000). He was on the editorial boards of Early American Literature and Studies in Eighteenth-Century Culture. In 2006, the Modern Language Association honored him as Distinguished Scholar of Early American Literature.

His first published book (1977) was on Thomas Hooker (a "perceptive and sympathetic biography", and a "standard study"), the founder of the Connecticut Colony; subsequent book publications were on Thomas Jefferson, Ralph Waldo Emerson, and other transcendentalists. Jefferson was one of his research interests, and besides many articles on his life and thought, he published two bibliographies of Jefferson, in 1983 and 1992. His intensive study of Jefferson led him to new insights on the material, and made him "an intellectual historian of discourse, gender, and ethnicity". In the 1990s, a series of "landmark articles" made him "a central critical voice in retheorizing early American letters". He was the editor for the Penguin edition of Jefferson's Notes on the State of Virginia, edited the letters of John and Abigail Adams for Penguin, and edited the Cambridge Companion to Thomas Jefferson (2008). He also studied the issue of race in early American history and literature, and the collection A Mixed Race: Ethnicity in Early America (1992), which he edited, is cited by scholars as "excellent".

Shuffelton was married to Jane W. Shuffelton, for 46 years, and was survived by her and two children when he died, after a long illness (from cancer) on March 4, 2010, at age 69. An In Memoriam published in Early American Literature noted his warmth and collegiality, and his support for young scholars getting started in the field.

== Publications ==
=== Books and monographs ===
- Thomas Hooker, 1586-1647. 1977.
- Thomas Jefferson: A Comprehensive, Annotated Bibliography of Writings about Him (1826-1980). 1983.
- Thomas Jefferson, 1981-1990: An Annotated Bibliography. 1992.

=== Edited books and collections ===
- Mixed Race: Ethnicity in Early America. Oxford UP. 1993.
- The American Enlightenment. U of Rochester P. 1993.
- Notes on the State of Virginia. Penguin. 1999.
- The Letters of John and Abigail Adams. Penguin. 2003.
- The Cambridge Companion to Thomas Jefferson. Cambridge UP. 2009. ISBN 9780521867313.

=== Articles ===
- "The Discourse of Modernism in the Age of Jefferson," Prospects 15 (1990)
- "In Different Voices: Gender in the American Republic of Letters," Early American Literature 25 (1990)
- "From Jefferson to Thoreau: The Possibilities of Discourse," Arizona Quarterly 46 (1990)
- "Privation and Fulfillment: The Ordering of Early New England: A Review Essay," Early American Literature 25 (1990)
