= Timothy Feddersen =

American economist and political scientist (born 1958)

- Born: Timothy James Feddersen; 1958 (age 67–68)

Academic background
- Education: University of Rochester

Academic work
- Discipline: Managerial economics
- Institutions: Northwestern University
- Awards: Elected to the American Academy of Arts & Sciences (2015)

Timothy J. Feddersen (born 1958) is an American economist and political scientist. He is the Wendell Hobbs Professor of Managerial Politics, Professor of Managerial Economics & Decision Sciences, and Chair of the Personnel Committee at the Kellogg School of Management at Northwestern University. He earned his Bachelor of Arts degree in mathematics from Indiana University Bloomington in 1985 and his Ph.D. in political science from the University of Rochester in 1993. He was elected to the American Academy of Arts & Sciences in 2015.
