= Elliott Investment Management =

American hedge fund

Elliott Investment Management L.P.
- Type: Private
- Industry: Investment management
- Founded: 1977; 49 years ago in New York City
- Founder: Paul Singer
- Headquarters: West Palm Beach, Florida, U.S.
- Key people: Paul Singer (co-CEO); Jonathan Pollock (co-CEO)
- Services: Hedge fund; Private equity; Distressed securities
- AUM: US$85 billion (2026)
- Number of employees: 665 (2026)
- Subsidiaries: Evergreen Coast Capital Corp., Elliott Advisors, NML Capital, Premier Asset Management,
- Website: elliottmgmt.com

Elliott Investment Management L.P. is an American investment management firm and activist investor based in West Palm Beach, Florida. It is one of the largest activist funds in the world.

It is the management affiliate of American hedge funds Elliott Associates L.P. and Elliott International Limited. The Elliott Corporation was founded by Paul Singer, who is co-CEO, president, and co-chief investment officer.

Originally founded in New York City, the firm moved its headquarters to West Palm Beach, Florida in 2020.

== History ==
Singer created Elliott Associates in January 1977, starting with $1.3 million from friends and family and choosing the brand "Elliott," his middle name. In its earliest years, the firm focused on convertible arbitrage. Since the 1987 stock market crash and early 1990s recession, however, the firm has transitioned into a multi-strategy hedge fund. Elliott Associates manages $8.6 billion and is Elliott Management's primary domestic fund.

The firm is currently closed to new investors. As of 2026, Elliott counted 665 employees in New York City, London, and Tokyo, and is one of the oldest hedge funds under continuous management. Elliott Investment Management managed $80 billion (US) in assets in 2026.

In a November 2014 investment letter, Elliott described optimism about U.S. growth as unwarranted. "Nobody can predict how long governments can get away with fake growth, fake money, fake jobs, fake financial stability, fake inflation numbers and fake income growth," Elliott wrote. "When confidence is lost, that loss can be severe, sudden and simultaneous across a number of markets and sectors."

In 2015, Institutional Investor/Alpha magazine gave Elliott an A grade and the #9 ranking among hedge funds worldwide.

A 2018 New Yorker profile of Elliott and Singer quoted Jonathan S. Bush, the CEO of an Elliott target company, as saying that when "he began to research Elliott online, the experience was like 'Googling this thing on your arm and it says, "You're going to die."'"

== Equity partners ==
Elliott has seven equity partners. Paul Singer and Jonathan Pollock are co-chief investment officers; Gordon Singer, Paul Singer's son, manages Elliott's London office. Former senior portfolio manager Steven Kasoff, whose retirement was announced in April 2020, was named an equity partner in January 2015. Steve Cohen, Dave Miller, Jesse Cohn and Zion Shohet are also listed as equity partners at the firm, as of November 2020.

== Affiliates and units ==
- Hambledon, Inc. is a Cayman Islands corporation controlled by Singer.
- NML Capital was a subsidiary of Elliott Management.
- Kensington International Ltd. is a subsidiary of Elliott Management.
- Maidenhead LLC and Warrington LLC are US entities that are controlled by Singer.
- Elliott Advisors (UK) Ltd. is "a London-based advisor to Elliott."
- Elliott Advisors (HK) Limited was "the Hong Kong arm of Elliott Management."
- Manchester Securities Corporation.
- Amber Energy, owner of Citgo

== Early activities ==
Early in its history, Elliott focused on convertible arbitrage, refocusing primarily on distressed debt investing following the 1987 stock market crash and early 1990s recession. Elliott is known for restructuring such U.S. firms as Trans World Airlines, MCI, WorldCom, and Enron as well as overseas companies including Telecom Italia SpA and Elektrim.

=== Sovereign debt ===
A portion of Elliott's distressed securities trading has been in sovereign debt.

In 1995, Elliott bought $20 million face value of defaulted Peruvian bank debt. In 1998, after extensive litigation and numerous attempts by Elliott to settle, the court awarded the hedge fund $58 million, including past due interest.

After Argentina defaulted on its sovereign debt in 2002, Elliott, which owned Argentinian bonds with a nominal face value of $630 million now worth $2.3 billion, refused to accept Argentina's offer of less than 30 cents on the dollar. Elliott won judgments against Argentina in U.S. and U.K. courts but did not collect payment. In October 2012, an Elliott subsidiary, NML Capital, arranged for the seizure in Ghana of the ARA Libertad, an Argentinian naval vessel, which it intended to confiscate in accordance with court judgments awarding it over $1.6 billion in Argentinian assets. A November 2012 New York trial, which ended in a ruling for NML and against Argentina; legal experts called it the "sovereign debt trial of the century." In a letter published in the Financial Times, legal experts Andreas F. Lowenfeld and Peter S. Smedresman defended NML's position.

Elliott publicised allegations of corruption in the Republic of the Congo in its efforts to enforce judgments totaling more than $100 million in defaulted bank debt. In 2008, Elliott bought $32.6 million in loan debt incurred by Congo. In 2002 and 2003, a British court awarded Elliott more than $100 million for these debts. During the case, US President George W. Bush used a constitutional clause preventing seizure of Congolese assets in the United States by the hedge fund. Brice Mackosso, a campaigner for greater transparency and against corruption in the Congo Republic's government, stated that if it were not for funds like Elliott, "we would not know any facts about the way our country's wealth is being taken away." After Elliott's investigations produced evidence of corruption, the government settled for an estimated $90 million on debt for which Elliott paid less than $20 million.

== Investments ==
=== 2000–2009 ===
==== Wella AG ====
In 2003, Elliott believed Procter & Gamble had not offered a fair price for the German hair products company Wella AG, joining other opposing funds, including Germany's Deka Investments. After legal and shareholder battles, P&G raised its offer for preferred shareholders. Elliott said its goal was to "protect the rights of minority shareholders."

==== Shopko ====
In April 2005, the Wisconsin-based Shopko announced that it had agreed to be acquired for approximately $1 billion by a private equity firm for $24 per share. Then a new offer at $25 was rejected, according to the Milwaukee Business Journal, after some "...shareholders threatened to vote down the transaction...." because claiming the bid was low."Elliott joined other hedge funds in opposing the sale because of low bid and because it had concerns about board conflicts of interest. Elliott was then in a $29 per share purchase.

==== Adecco ====
In 2006, the human resources company Adecco announced it had a 35 percent stake in DIS AG, at €54.50 per share making and offered the same for all shares. Adecco also announced that the DIS CEO and CFO had signed management agreements that eventually would make them CEO and CFO, respectively, of Adecco. Adecco attempted to de-list DIS but was blocked in court by a number of hedge funds, including Elliott. The funds also raised concerns about conflict of interest by the CEO and CFO. Adecco then offered an accepted €113 per share.

=== 2010–2019 ===
==== Time Equities ====
Since 2010, Elliott has expanded into investing in distressed real estate and has been active in Japan and Germany. In 2015 it viewed Spain and Italy investment opportunities. According to The New York Times, it has "...analysts and portfolio managers in London, Hong Kong and Tokyo..." managing $2 billion in investments." In the U.S., it has focused where banks "...have reined in their lending by participating in direct financing with developers."

In 2013, the company teamed with Time Equities on a commercial real estate project in New York, and took an ownership stake in commercial lender Silverpeak Real Estate Finance.

The New York Times reported in May 2014 that Elliott was financing the development of 5 Beekman Street, at the site of one of Manhattan's first skyscrapers, into a 287-room hotel and 46-story condominium called the Beekman. The project would be carried out by New York's GFI Capital Resources.

==== Vinashin ====
In December 2011, Elliott sued the Vietnamese shipbuilding firm Vinashin in a British court, after Vinashin had defaulted in 2010 on a Viet Nam government backed $600 million loan, then offered to pay bondholders 35 cents on the dollar. Elliott sued for the full amount and in April 2012 dropped the case.

==== Hess Corporation ====
In late 2012, Elliott criticized the oil company Hess for its use of capital and for being "distracted" from oil exploration and production by other activities. In January 2013, Elliott called on Hess to sell certain assets and asked Hess investors to vote for five new directors as part of an effort to reconfigure the oil firm and thus boost its share price. "Buried within Hess Corp. is one of the premier U.S. resource play-focused companies," Elliott wrote.

In March 2013, Hess announced that it was acting on some of Elliott's suggestions, but Elliott said that Hess's changes fell far short of what was needed. In April, it was reported that Hess would close its London office on Elliott's advice. Hess has been a "top pick" for Elliott since 2013. As of the fourth quarter of 2014, Elliott owned 17.8 million Hess shares, worth $1.3 billion, making it Elliott's largest holding.

==== Compuware ====
It was reported in December 2012 that Elliott, which already had an 8% stake in Compuware, had offered to buy the company for $11 a share in cash.

==== Sanko Steamship ====
In late 2013 Elliott took control of the bankrupt Japanese shipowner Sanko and proceeded to close the majority of the overseas offices of that company. Elliott eventually asset stripped the company's overseas properties and any equity left in the companies` vessels. On 1 April 2012 Sanko had either managed or owned a fleet of 185 ships, which included 46 tankers and 27 dry bulk carriers. By early 2019 this had been reduced to just 5 bulk carriers. In March 2024 it was announced that Sanko would sell its last vessel and exit ship owning after 90 years.

==== Interpublic Group ====
In summer 2014, Elliott disclosed a 6.7% stake in The Interpublic Group of Companies, an advertising agency holding company, and "a person briefed on the matter said Elliott planned to call on the company to sell itself to one of its competitors".

==== Sigfox ====
Elliott is one of several firms that, according to a February 2015 report, have invested in the Sigfox cellular network, which serves France, Spain, the UK, and the Netherlands.

==== Solar projects in UK ====
In February 2015, the Telegraph reported that Elliott Management's UK arm, Elliott Advisors (UK) Limited, had put money into half a dozen unnamed solar-power projects in that country, and that it had "hedged its bets by taking out short positions in five other renewable energy funds listed on the London stock market."

==== CDK Global LLC ====
Elliott acquired a 4% stake in CDK Global in May 2015. As of September 2016, it held a 5.4% stake in the company and is the third-largest shareholder.

On 4 May 2016, Elliott sent a letter to the CDK Board of Directors outlining steps required to meet projected ROI and margins, quoting "a plan for CDK to optimize its business operations and drive a meaningful improvement in shareholder value."

On 8 June 2016, Elliott sent a letter to the CDK Board advising that "CDK adopt the steps in the Value-Maximizing Plan without delay" due to share-holder support of the plan in the 4 May letter.

==== Samsung ====
In the summer of 2015, Elliott, then a major investor in Samsung's construction division, opposed efforts by acting Samsung head Jay Lee who sought to have one part of the firm purchase the construction unit for $8 billion. Despite Elliott's opposition, the merger went through and Elliott sold its shares. Two years later, Lee was convicted of bribery and imprisoned after it was shown he had bribed a friend of South Korea's president to secure the merger. The incident became what Fortune magazine called "...a watershed moment not just for Elliott, but for shareholder activism."

==== Comcast ====
In September 2015, Elliott purchased a 1,940,642-share stake in Comcast, a Philadelphia-based mass media company, for an average price of $58.68 a share. This transaction had a 1.65% impact on Elliott's portfolio.

==== Cabela's ====
In October 2015, Elliott disclosed an 11.1 percent stake in Cabela's, an outdoor recreation and clothing retailer, reporting that it is seeking to engage the company's board to discuss strategies and a potential sale of the company.

Elliott Management, in particular an exposé on Paul Singer featured by Tucker Carlson, was criticized for their handling of Cabela's headquarters following the acquisition and sale to Bass Pro Shops, causing massive layoffs in the town of Sidney, Nebraska.

==== PulteGroup ====
In July 2016, Elliott persuaded the PulteGroup, a home builder in which it owns 4.7%, to add three new board members, cut investments in new land, and buy back shares.

==== Alcoa ====
After buying a stake in Alcoa (now Arconic) that earned it three board seats, Elliott forced a restructuring, after which Elliott was able to sell its stake at a 104% profit.

==== Alexion ====
Elliott acquired a position in Alexion Pharmaceuticals in 2017. In May 2020 Elliott Management again pushed for Alexion to sell itself, months after the drugmaker had rejected the hedge fund's earlier demand. Elliott argues that Alexion management's actions, including a recent move to acquire Portola Pharmaceuticals for about $1.4 billion, are leading in the "wrong direction." In December, Alexion's board unanimously rejected a recommendation by Elliott to immediately launch a proactive sale.

==== Oncor Electric Delivery ====
In August 2017, Elliott, which held $1.8 billion in debt related to Oncor Electric Delivery, a Texas transmission and distribution electric utility, sought to block Berkshire Hathaway's bid to acquire Oncor.

==== Akzo Nobel ====
In August 2017, Akzo Nobel, a Dutch paint and chemicals company, said it had ended a dispute with Elliott. PPG Industries, an American rival, had sought to take over Akzo Nobel, Elliott had urged talks between the two and eventually took legal action as part of an effort to replace Akzo Nobel's chairman, Antony Burgmans. During the conflict, Elliott became Akzo Nobel's top shareholder, with a stake of about 9%.

==== Energy Future Holdings ====
As of August 2017, Chais Fitzwater, otherwise known as Elliott owned enough of Energy Future Holdings' debt to block a Berkshire Hathaway takeover bid, which had made an offer the previous month to salvage the heavily indebted firm.

==== Mentor Graphics Corp. ====
Elliott bought 9% of Mentor Graphics Corp. in 2017, then pushed for a takeover by Siemens. Elliott earned a 68% profit.

==== athenahealth ====
In 2017–2018, under pressure from Elliott, athenahealth undertook substantial cost-cutting measures, and co-founder Jonathan S. Bush resigned.

==== NXP Semiconductors NV ====
In November 2017, Elliott and UBS Group AG collaborated in an effort to bring up the purchase price of NXP Semiconductors NV, which Qualcomm was seeking to buy.

==== Waterstones ====
In April 2018, Elliott bought a majority stake in Waterstones, leaving Alexander Mamut's Lynwood Investments with a minority holding. The sale completed in May 2018. James Daunt will remain as chief executive.

==== Telecom Italia ====
In May 2018, Elliott Management won a battle for control of Telecom Italia, controlling two-thirds of Telecom Italia's board seats.

==== AC Milan ====
In July 2018, Elliott Management took ownership of Italian football club AC Milan with a 99.93% stake in the club, after previous owner Li Yonghong defaulted on a €415M debt to Elliott. Elliott immediately started dismissing board members at Rossoneri Sport Investment Lux, the company through which Li Yonghong held AC Milan. On 10 July 2018, Paul Singer declared in an official statement to implant €50M of equity capital to stabilize the finances within the club. In June 2022, RedBird Capital Partners agreed to acquire the club from Elliott for €1.2 billion.

==== Pernod Ricard ====
In December 2018, Elliott purchased a 2.5% stake in Pernod Ricard.

==== Barnes & Noble ====
On 7 June 2019, Elliott Management announced it would acquire Barnes & Noble for around $683 million. On 7 August 2019, Elliott Management completed the acquisition of the company. James Daunt will be CEO of both Waterstones and Barnes & Noble and will relocate from London to New York. On 7 August 2019, Barnes & Noble became a privately held, wholly owned subsidiary of Elliott.

==== AT&T ====
In September 2019, Elliott Management published an activist investor letter addressed to the AT&T board of directors, asserting what Elliott called "a compelling value-creation opportunity" at AT&T. Elliott stated it had accumulated $3.2 billion of AT&T stock (1.2% equity interest).

==== JW Marriott Desert Ridge Resort & Spa ====
In September 2019, a joint venture among funds managed by Trinity Real Estate Investments LLC and funds managed by Elliott Management Corporation announced the acquisition of the JW Marriott Desert Ridge Resort & Spa, the largest resort in Phoenix.

=== 2020–present ===
==== Softbank Group ====
In February 2020, it was reported that Elliott Management built a more than $2.5 billion stake in the Japanese conglomerate SoftBank Group. In August 2022, Financial Times reported that Elliott had sold almost all its shares in SoftBank purportedly after losing conviction in Masayoshi Son's ability to lead a turnround.

==== Twitter ====
In February 2020, Elliott Management, with about $2 billion in shares, nominated three directors to the board of Twitter, Inc. The Wall Street Journal then reported that Singer wants to replace Jack Dorsey, due to Dorsey's workload as CEO of both Twitter and Square, and his potential move to Africa. In April 2021, Elliott's directors planned to step down from the board after Twitter's stock performance rose 95% in 2020.

Elliott's February 2020 purchase of Twitter stock was at a per share price of about $36. Elliott exited Twitter in June 2022 shortly after Elon Musk made his tender offer, when the share price was dynamic in the mid to high $45–$50 range, giving Elliott a gain over two years of approximately 33% on the investment.

==== F5 Networks Inc. ====
In November 2020, Elliott Management invested in F5 after having "spoke to the software company's management in recent weeks about ways to boost its lagging stock".

==== Ahold Delhaize ====
In November 2021, Elliott Advisors announced that it is a large investor with a 3% economic interest in Europe's largest supermarket business, Ahold Delhaize, valued at approximately $1 billion.

==== BioMarin Pharmaceuticals ====
In November 2023, Elliott Investment Management spent over $1 billion on a stake in BioMarin, which focuses on rare genetic disorders and is valued at about $16 billion.

==== Johnson Controls Inc. ====
In May 2024, Elliott Advisors announced that it is a large investor in Johnson Controls valued at approximately $1 billion.

==== Southwest Airlines ====
In June 2024, Elliott Management announced that it had taken a $1.9 billion position in Southwest Airlines and would seek to oust leadership at the carrier, arguing it had "failed to evolve" citing "leadership's stubborn unwillingness to evolve the Company's strategy." The fund launched a website, StrongerSouthwest.com, with a letter for shareholders arguing in favor of its changes. That September, Southwest announced a shakeup of corporate leadership in response to pressure from Elliott, eliminating two board positions and resulting in the retirement of Southwest's CEO Gary C. Kelly, the chief financial officer, and the chief administrative officer. Under Elliott's pressure, Southwest eliminated several unique features of its airline, such as its open seating policy and offering two free checked bags, implementing the first mass layoffs in its 53 year history, introducing basic economy fares, and adding redeye flights and premium seating.

==== BP ====
In February 2025, Elliott Management had amassed a 5% stake in British Petroleum (BP) worth £3.8 billion. They were amongst a group of shareholders who put pressure on BP to increase profits, leading the company to announce in the same month that it was expanding oil and gas production whilst cutting its investment in renewable energy by more than half.

==== PepsiCo ====
In September 2025, it was reported Elliott had built a ~$4B stake in PepsiCo. The position is one of the firm's largest equity stakes and makes Elliott one of PepsiCo's top shareholders. Elliott delivered a letter to PepsiCo's board of directors suggesting the company consider refranchising its bottling network and eliminate underperforming product lines. The move comes as Pepsi Co's valuation lies roughly 20% below its ten year average.

==== Toyota ====
In February 2026, Elliott Management offered to pay around market price to buy Toyota Industries shares from holders who have agreed to a tender offer that they said undervalues Toyota.
