= Sasikanth Manipatruni =

American electrical engineer (born 1984)

- Born: 1984 (age 41–42)
- Education: Cornell University; ETH Zurich; IIT Delhi; Indian Institute of Science; Jawahar Navodaya Vidyalaya
- Known for: Beyond CMOS; Magneto-Electric Spin-Orbit; Silicon photonics Spintronics; In-memory processing Quantum materials Artificial intelligence
- Awards: IEEE/ACM Young Innovator Award, National Academy of Engineering Frontiers award, SRC Mahboob Khan Award
- Scientific career
- Workplaces: Intel; General Electric Research Laboratory; Cornell University; ETH Zurich; Indian Institute of Science; Inter-University Centre for Astronomy and Astrophysics
- Thesis: Scaling silicon nanophotonic interconnects : silicon electrooptic modulators, slowlight & optomechanical devices (2010)
- Doctoral advisor: Michal Lipson; Alexander Gaeta
- Other academic advisors: Ajoy Ghatak; Manfred Morari; Christopher J. Hardy; Keren Bergman

Sasikanth Manipatruni is an Indian-American computer scientist and inventor known for his work in Beyond CMOS energy-efficient computing, spintronics and Silicon photonics. He is the lead author on Intel's 2018 Nature paper proposing MESO magneto-electric spin-orbit devices, an experimental beyond-CMOS logic technology combining Multiferroics and spin-orbit coupling to achieve ultra-low switching energies. His research has been covered by independent science outlets including Berkeley News, Physics World, Nature research communities and The Register and expert peer reviewed research reviews in Nature, Reviews of Modern Physics, which describe MESO as a potential path beyond conventional transistor scaling. Manipatruni contributed to developments in silicon photonics, spintronics and quantum materials.

Manipatruni is a co-author of 50 research papers and ~400 patents (cited about 10000 times) in the areas of electro-optic modulators, Cavity optomechanics, nanophotonics & optical interconnects, spintronics, and new logic devices for extension of Moore's law. His work has appeared in Nature, Nature Physics, Nature communications, Science advances and Physical Review Letters and in publicly archived lectures of US National Academy of Sciences.

== Early life and education ==
Manipatruni completed his schooling from Jawahar Navodaya Vidyalaya. Later, he received a bachelor's degree in Electrical Engineering and Physics from IIT Delhi in 2005 where he graduated with the institute silver medal. He also completed research under the Kishore Vaigyanik Protsahan Yojana at Indian Institute of Science working at Inter-University Centre for Astronomy and Astrophysics and in optimal control at Swiss Federal Institute of Technology at Zurich.

== Research Impact ==
Independent outlets highlighted MESO's potential: Physics World described it as "combining topological materials and multiferroics to achieve ultra-low voltage logic switching". Berkeley News called it a "breakthrough that could take computers beyond the semiconductor era." Recent peer-reviewed reviews identify MESO as a promising direction in beyond-CMOS logic research. Article by Nobel Laureate Albert Fert in Reviews of Modern Physics prominently discusses MESO and its impact as "MESO is expected to strongly reduce power consumption for computation by harnessing ferroic materials that have embedded non-volatility and by relying on a voltage rather than a current to switch the ferroic order parameter". MESO has been reviewed as a higher energy efficiency logic technology in multiple secondary reviews and annual magnetism roadmaps. MESO and subcomponents have been investigated in multiple research and doctoral dissertation projects.

Manipatruni received his Ph.D. in Electrical Engineering with minor in applied engineering physics from Cornell University. The title of his thesis was "Scaling silicon nanophotonic interconnects : silicon electrooptic modulators, slowlight & optomechanical devices". His thesis advisors were Michal Lipson and Alexander Gaeta at Cornell University. He has co-authored academic research with Michal Lipson, Alexander Gaeta, Keren Bergman, Ramamoorthy Ramesh, Lane W. Martin, Naresh Shanbhag, Jian-Ping Wang, Paul McEuen, Christopher J. Hardy, Felix Casanova, Ehsan Afshari, Alyssa Apsel, Jacob T. Robinson, fr:Manuel Bibes spanning Condensed matter physics, Electronics and devices, Photonics, Circuit theory, Computer architecture and hardware for Artificial intelligence areas.

=== Silicon optical links ===
Manipatruni's PhD thesis was focused on developing the then nascent field of silicon photonics by progressively scaling the speed of electro-optic modulation from 1 GHz to 12.5 Gbit/s, 18 Gbit/s and 50 Gbit/s on a single physical optical channel driven by a silicon photonic component. The significance of silicon for optical uses can be understood as follows: nearly 95% of modern Integrated circuit technology is based on silicon-based semiconductors which have high productivity in Semiconductor device fabrication due to the use of large single crystal wafers and extraordinary control of the quality of the interfaces. However, Photonic integrated circuits are still majorly manufactured using III-V compound semiconductor materials and II-VI semiconductor compound materials, whose engineering lags silicon industry by several decades (judged by number of wafers and devices produced per year). By showing that silicon can be used as a material to turn light signal on and off, silicon electro-optic modulators allow for use of high-quality engineering developed for the electronics industry to be adopted for photonics/optics industry. This the foundational argument used by silicon electro-optics researchers. This work was paralleled closely at leading industrial research groups at Intel, IBM and Luxtera during 2005–2010 with industry adopting and improving various methods developed at academic research labs. Manipatruni's work showed that it is practically possible to develop free carrier injection modulators (in contrast to carrier depletion modulators) to reach high speed modulation by engineering injection of free carriers via pre-amplification and back-to-back connected injection mode devices.

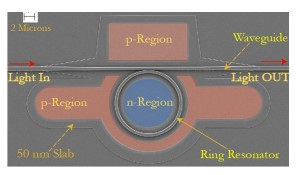
a silicon micro ring modulator imaged with a surface electron microscope

In combination with Keren Bergman at Columbia University, micro-ring modulator research led to demonstration of a number of firsts in long-distance uses of silicon photonics utilizing silicon based injection mode electro-optic modulators including first demonstration of long-haul transmission using silicon microring modulators first Error-free transmission of microring-modulated BPSK, First Demonstration of 80-km Long-Haul Transmission of 12.5-Gb/s Data Using Silicon Microring Resonator Electro-Optic Modulator, First Experimental Bit-Error-Rate Validation of 12.5-Gb/s Silicon Modulator Enabling Photonic Networks-on-Chip. These academic results have been applied into products widely deployed at Cisco, Intel.

==== Application for computing and medical imaging ====
Manipatruni, Lipson and collaborators at Intel have projected a roadmap that required the use of Silicon micro-ring modulators to meet the bandwidth, linear bandwidth density (bandwidth/cross section length) and area bandwidth density (bandwidth/area) of on-die communication links. While originally considered thermally unstable, by early 2020's micro-ring modulators have received wide adoption for computing needs at Intel Ayar Labs, Global foundries and varied optical interconnect usages.

$E_{switch_Optical_Link}>\hbar\omega.V_{receive}.C_{d}.10^{L*\alpha/10}/(\eta_{L}\eta_{D}\eta_{M}\eta_{C}e) +(V_{m}\Theta\Delta.T)/((dn/d\rho)(dT/dn))+(2/B)P_{tune}\Delta\lambda+E_{SD}*(B/(2F_{clock}))$

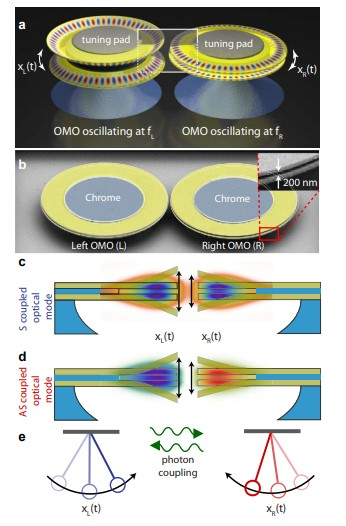
synchronization of mechanical vibrtions using optical radiation pressure

The optimal energy of an on-die optical link is written as : where $V_{receive}$is the optimal detector voltage (maintaining the bit error rate), $C_{d}$ detector capacitance, $V_{m}$ is the modulator drive voltage, $\Theta, dn/d\rho, dT/dn$ are the electrooptic volume of the optical cavity being stabilized, refractive index change to carrier concentration and spectral sensitivity of the device to refractive index change $\Delta.T$ is the change in optical transmission, B is the bandwidth of the link, Ptune the power to keep the resonator operational and B the bandwidth of the link at F frequency of the data being serialized.

Manipatruni and Christopher J. Hardy applied integrated photonic links to the Magnetic resonance imaging to improve the signal collection rate from the MRI machines via the signal collection coils while working at the General Electric's GE Global Research facility. The use of optical transduction of the MRI signals can allow significantly higher signal collection arrays within the MRI system increasing the signal throughput, reducing the time to collect the image and overall reduction of the weight of the coils and cost of MRI imaging by reducing the imaging time.

=== Cavity optomechanics and optical radiation pressure ===
Manipatruni proposed the first observation that optical radiation pressure leads to non-reciprocity in micro cavity opto-mechanics in 2009 in the classical electro-magnetic domain without the use of magnetic isolators. In classical Newtonian optics, it was understood that light rays must be able to retrace their path through a given combination of optical media. However, once the momentum of light is taken into account inside a movable media this need not be true in all cases. This work proposed that breaking of the reciprocity (i.e. properties of media for forward and backward moving light can be violated) is observable in microscale optomechanical systems due to their small mass, low mechanical losses and high amplification of light due to long confinement times.

Later work has established the breaking of reciprocity in a number of nanophotonic conditions including time modulation and parametric effects in cavities. Manipatruni and Lipson have also applied the nascent devices in silicon photonics to optical synchronization and generation of non-classical beams of light using optical non-linearities.

=== Memory and spintronic devices ===
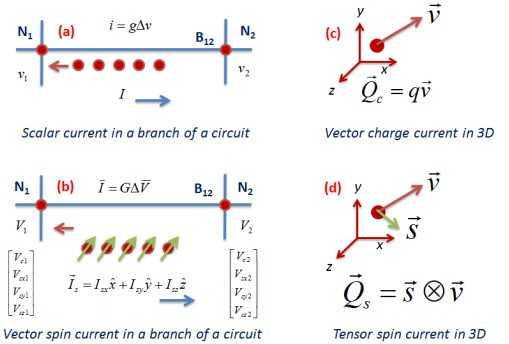
Conceptual diagram of two nodes in a circuit connected by a conductance branch: a) two nodes connected by a scalar conductance in a regular circuit; b) two nodes connected by a spin conductance in a spin circuit. c) Conceptual diagram of a spin current tensor when a spin current flows in a 3D space. d) Spin current tensor is reduced to a spin current vector when a direction is implied by a branch of the circuit. The current and the voltages in a spin circuit are 4 component vectors carrying both the scalar current/voltage quantities and vector spin current/voltage quantities. The linearity of the circuit implies that the connecting branch is described by a 4X4 spin conductance matrix.

Manipatruni worked on Spintronics for the development of logic computing devices for computational nodes beyond the existing limits to silicon-based transistors. He developed an extended modified nodal analysis that uses vector circuit theory for spin-based currents and voltages using modified nodal analysis which allows the use of spin components inside VLSI designs used widely in the industry. The circuit modeling is based on theoretical work by Supriyo Datta and Gerrit E. W. Bauer. Manipatruni's spin circuit models were extensively applied for development of spin logic circuits, spin interconnects, domain wall interconnects and benchmarking logic and memory devices utilizing spin and magnetic circuits.

In 2011, utilizing the discovery of Spin Hall effect and Spin–orbit interaction in heavy metals from Robert Buhrman, Daniel Ralph and Ioan Miron in Period 6 element transition metals Manipatruni proposed an integrated spin-hall effect memory (Later named Spin-Orbit Memory to comprehend the complex interplay of interface and bulk components of the spin current generation) combined with modern Fin field-effect transistor transistors to address the growing difficulty with embedded Static random-access memory in modern Semiconductor process technology. SOT-MRAM for SRAM replacement spurred significant research and development leading to successful demonstration of SOT-MRAM combined with Fin field-effect transistors in 22 nm process and 14 nm process at various foundries.

Working with Jian-Ping Wang, Manipatruni and collaborators were able to show evidence of a 4th elemental ferro-magnet. Given the rarity of ferro-magnetic materials in elemental form at room temperature, use of a less rare element can help with the adoption of permanent magnet based driven systems for electric vehicles.

=== Computational logic devices and quantum materials ===
In 2016, Manipatruni and collaborators proposed a number of changes to the new logic device development by identifying the core criterion for the logic devices for utilization beyond the 2 nm process. The continued slow down the Moore's law as evidenced by slow down of the voltage scaling, lithographic node scaling and increasing cost per wafer and complexity of the fabs indicated that Moore's law as it existed in the 2000-2010 era has changed to a less aggressive scaling paradigm.

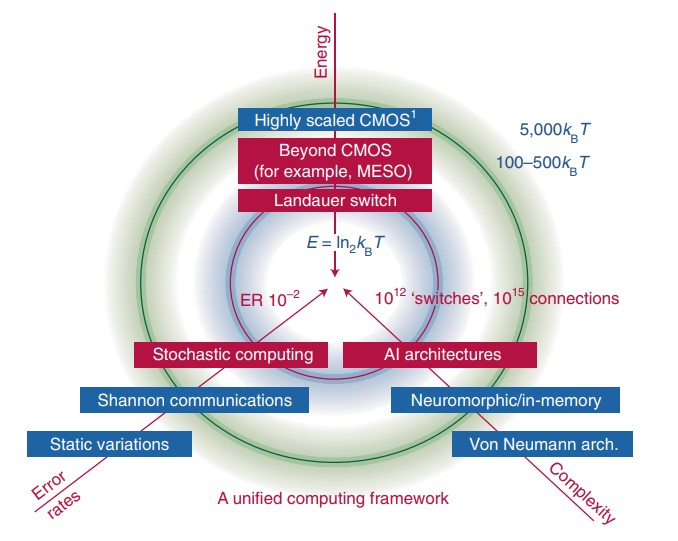
unified computing framework for logic beyond 2 nm nodes

Manipatruni proposed that spintronic and multiferroic systems are leading candidates for achieving attojoule-class logic gates for computing, thereby enabling the continuation of Moore's law for transistor scaling. However, shifting the materials focus of computing towards oxides and topological materials requires a holistic approach addressing energy, stochasticity and complexity.

The Manipatruni-Nikonov-Young Figure-of-Merit for computational quantum materials is defined as the ratio of " $E_{switching}$ energy to switch a device at room temperature" to "$E(\pm\theta)$ energy of thermodynamic stability of the materials compared to vacuum energy, where $\pm\theta$ is the reversal of the order parameter such as ferro-electric polarization or magnetization of the material"

$\lambda =E_{switching}/E(\pm\theta)$

This ratio is universally optimal for a ferro-electric material and compared favorably to spintronic and CMOS switching elements such as MOS transistors and BJTs. The framework (adopted by SIA decadal plan) describes a unified computing framework that uses physical scaling (physics-based improvement in device energy and density), mathematical scaling (using information theoretic improvements to allow higher error rate as devices scale to thermodynamic limits) and complexity scaling (architectural scaling that moves from distinct memory & logic units to AI based architectures). Combining Shannon inspired computing allows the physical stochastic errors inherent in highly scaled devices to be mitigated by information theoretic techniques.

Ian A. Young, Nikonov, and Manipatruni have provided a list of 10 outstanding problems in quantum materials as they pertain to computational devices. These problems have been subsequently addressed in numerous research works leading to various improved device properties for a future computer technology Beyond CMOS. The top problems listed as milestones and challenges for logic are as follows:

Problems of magnetic/ferro-electric/multiferroic switching

1. How to switch a magnetic/multiferroic (MF) state in volume of 1,000 nm^{3} with a stability of 100 k_{B}T and an energy of 1 aJ ~ 6.25 eV ~ 240 kT?
2. What are the timescales involved with magnetoelectric/ferroelectric (FE)/MF switching of a magnet/FE/MF at scaled sizes? How to overcome the Larmor precession timescale of a ferromagnet?
3. How to switch a scaled magnet/polarization switch with low stochastic errors? What are the fundamental mechanisms governing the switching errors, fatigue for scaled FE/ME switching?
4. What is the right combination of materials/order parameters for practical magnetoelectric switching (for example, multiferroic FE/antiferromagnet (AFM) plus FM, paraelectric/AFM plus FM, piezoelectric plus magnetostriction)? Problems of magnetic/multiferroic/ferroelectric detection
5. How to detect the state of a magnet/ferroelectric with high read-out voltage >100 mV? For inverse spin–orbit effects, such as the spin galvanic effect/Edelstein effect, how to achieve λIREE > 10 nm with high resistivity?
6. What is the scaling dependence of spin–orbit detection of the state of a magnet? How to detect the state of a perpendicular magnet with spin–orbit effect? Problems of interconnects and complexity
7. How to transfer the state of a magnet/FE over long distances on scaled wire sizes (<30-nm-wide wires with pitch <60 nm)? In particular, how to improve the spin diffusion interconnects in non-magnetic conductors and magnon interconnects in magnetic interconnects?
8. How to transduce a spintronic/multiferroic state to a photonic state (and vice versa) to enable very long-distance interconnects (>100 μm)67?
9. The back-end of CMOS comprises multiple layers of metal wires separated by a dielectric. Tus making logic devices between these layers requires starting with an amorphous layer and a template for growth of the functional materials. How to integrate the magnetic/FE/MF materials in the back-end of the CMOS chip50,68?
10. How to utilize stochastic switches (spin/FE) operating near practical thermodynamic conditions in a computing architecture?
11. How to utilize the extreme scaling (with size, logic efficiency and three-dimensional integration) feasible with spin/FE devices in a computer architecture in order to achieve 10 billion switches per chip18,19

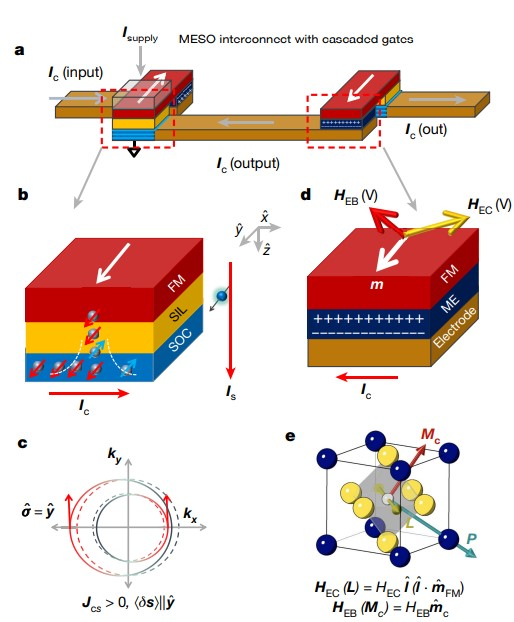

Magneto-electric spin-orbit logic is a design using this methodology for a new logical component that couples magneto-electric effect and spin orbit effects. Compared to CMOS, MESO circuits could potentially require less energy for switching, lower operating voltage, and a higher integration density.

== Awards ==
- Under-40 Innovators Award (2017) — Presented by the Design Automation Conference (ACM/IEEE/ESDA-sponsored).
- Mahboob Khan Outstanding Liaison Award (2016) — Presented by the Semiconductor Research Corporation.
- Under-40 Innovators, U.S. Frontiers of Engineering Symposium (2019) — Selected by the National Academy of Engineering.

== Selected publications and patents ==
- Manipatruni, Sasikanth; Nikonov, Dmitri E.; Lin, Chia-Ching; Gosavi, Tanay A.; Liu, Huichu; Prasad, Bhagwati; Huang, Yen-Lin; Bonturim, Everton; Ramamoorthy Ramesh; Young, Ian A. (2018-12-03). "Scalable energy-efficient magnetoelectric spin–orbit logic". Nature. 565 (7737): 35–42. doi:10.1038/s41586-018-0770-2. ISSN 0028-0836
- Manipatruni, S., Nikonov, D.E. and Young, I.A., 2018. Beyond CMOS computing with spin and polarization. Nature Physics, 14(4), pp. 338–343
- Manipatruni, S., Nikonov, D.E. and Young, I.A., 2014. Energy-delay performance of giant spin Hall effect switching for dense magnetic memory. Applied Physics Express, 7(10), p. 103001.
- Manipatruni, S., Nikonov, D.E. and Young, I.A., 2012. Modeling and design of spintronic integrated circuits. IEEE Transactions on Circuits and Systems I: Regular Papers, 59(12), pp. 2801–2814.
- Pham, V.T., Groen, I., Manipatruni, S., Choi, W.Y., Nikonov, D.E., Sagasta, E., Lin, C.C., Gosavi, T.A., Marty, A., Hueso, L.E. and Young, I.A., 2020. Spin–orbit magnetic state readout in scaled ferromagnetic/heavy metal nanostructures. Nature Electronics, 3(6), pp. 309–315.
- Chen, Z., Chen, Z., Kuo, C.Y., Tang, Y., Dedon, L.R., Li, Q., Zhang, L., Klewe, C., Huang, Y.L., Prasad, B. and Farhan, A., 2018. Complex strain evolution of polar and magnetic order in multiferroic BiFeO_{3} thin films. Nature communications, 9(1), pp. 1–9.
- Xu, Q., Manipatruni, S., Schmidt, B., Shakya, J. and Lipson, M., 2007. 12.5 Gbit/s carrier-injection-based silicon micro-ring silicon modulators. Optics express, 15(2), pp. 430–436.
- Manipatruni, S., Nikonov, D.E., Lin, C.C., Prasad, B., Huang, Y.L., Damodaran, A.R., Chen, Z., Ramesh, R. and Young, I.A., 2018. Voltage control of unidirectional anisotropy in ferromagnet-multiferroic system. Science advances, 4(11), p.eaat4229.
- Zhang, M., Wiederhecker, G.S., Manipatruni, S., Barnard, A., McEuen, P. and Lipson, M., 2012. Synchronization of micromechanical oscillators using light. Physical review letters, 109(23), p. 233906.
- Manipatruni, S., Robinson, J.T. and Lipson, M., 2009. Optical nonreciprocity in optomechanical structures. Physical review letters, 102(21), p. 213903.
- Fang, M.Y.S., Manipatruni, S., Wierzynski, C., Khosrowshahi, A. and DeWeese, M.R., 2019. Design of optical neural networks with component imprecisions. Optics Express, 27(10), pp. 14009–14029.
- Chen, L., Preston, K., Manipatruni, S. and Lipson, M., 2009. Integrated GHz silicon photonic interconnect with micrometer-scale modulators and detectors. Optics express, 17(17), pp. 15248–15256.
- Dutt, A., Luke, K., Manipatruni, S., Gaeta, A.L., Nussenzveig, P. and Lipson, M., 2015. On-chip optical squeezing. Physical Review Applied, 3(4), p. 044005.

=== AI and in-memory computing ===
- Korgaonkar, K., Bhati, I., Liu, H., Gaur, J., Manipatruni, S., Subramoney, S., Karnik, T., Swanson, S., Young, I. and Wang, H., 2018, June. Density tradeoffs of non-volatile memory as a replacement for SRAM based last level cache. In 2018 ACM/IEEE 45th Annual International Symposium on Computer Architecture (ISCA) (pp. 315–327). IEEE.
- Pipeline circuit architecture to provide in-memory computation functionality, US20190057050A1
- Low synch dedicated accelerator with in-memory computation capability, US20190056885A1
- In-memory analog neural cache, US20190057304A1,

== See also ==
- Michal Lipson
- Christopher J. Hardy
- Keren Bergman
- Silicon photonics
- Magneto-Electric Spin-Orbit logic
