= General Electric Research Laboratory =

- U.S. National Register of Historic Places
- U.S. National Historic Landmark
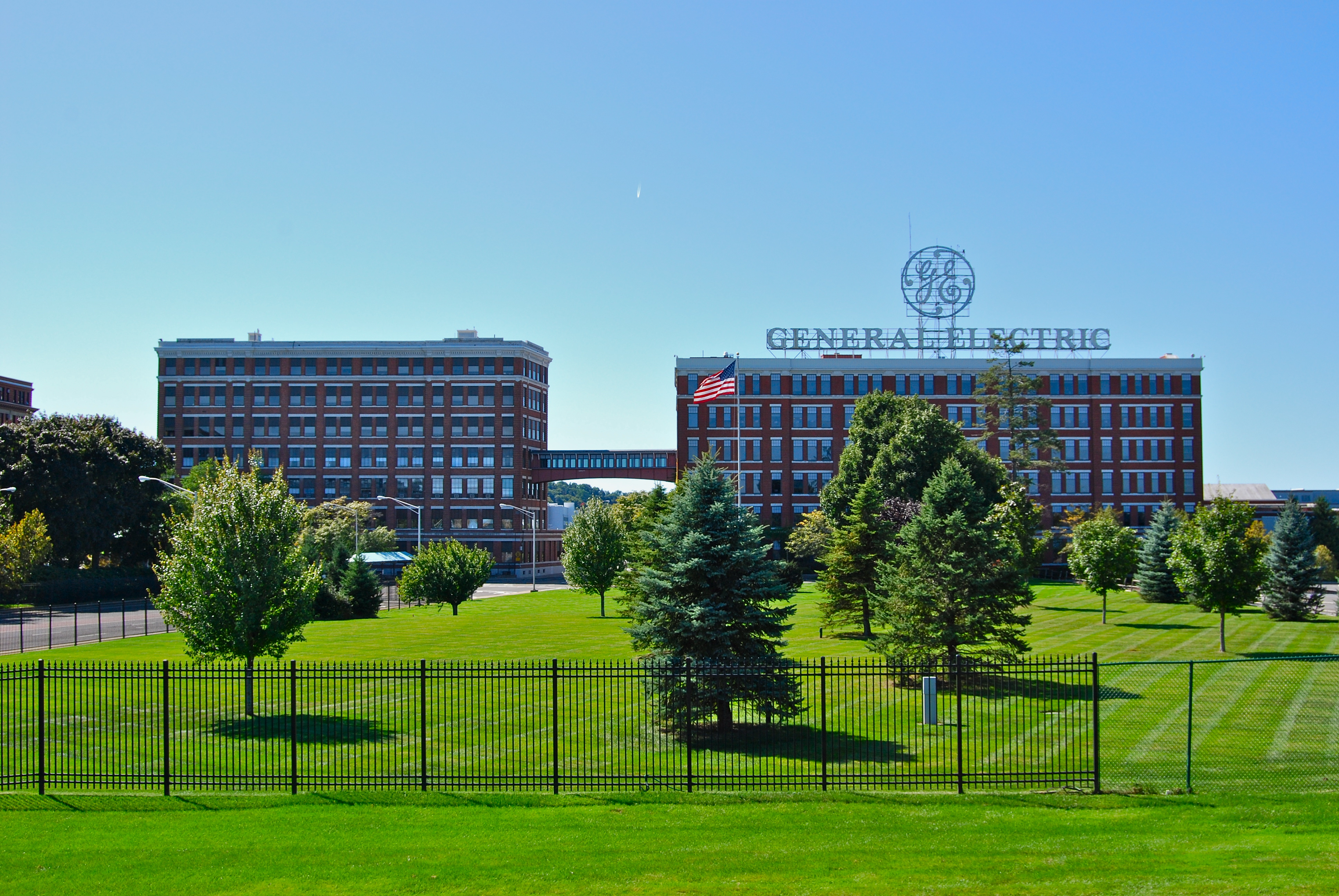
- Interactive map showing the General Electric Research Laboratory’s location
- Location: Schenectady, NY
- Coordinates: 42°48′38.78″N 73°57′5.67″W
- NRHP reference No.: 75001227

Significant dates
- Added to NRHP: May 15, 1975
- Designated NHL: May 15, 1975

General Electric Research Laboratory was the first industrial research facility in the United States. Established in 1900, the lab was home to the early technological breakthroughs of General Electric and created a research and development environment that set the standard for industrial innovation for years to come. It developed into GE Global Research that now covers an array of technological research, ranging from healthcare to transportation systems, at multiple locations throughout the world. Its campus in Schenectady, New York was designated a National Historic Landmark in 1975.

== History ==
=== Founding ===
Founded in 1900 by Thomas Edison, Willis R. Whitney, and Charles Steinmetz, this lab defined industrial research for years to come. Elihu Thomson, one of the founding members of the laboratory, summed up the goal of the lab saying, "It does seem to me therefore that a Company as large as the General Electric Company, should not fail to continue investing and developing in new fields: there should, in fact, be a research laboratory for commercial applications of new principles, and even for the discovery of those principles." Furthermore, Edwin W. Rice, founding vice president, said they wanted to "establish a laboratory to be devoted exclusively to original research. It is hoped by this means that many profitable fields may be discovered." Whitney and the founders of the research lab took many of their lab ideals from a German university model. German universities allowed professors to research and experiment with their own interests to seek further knowledge without having commercial or economic interests in mind. Other German scientists also researched exclusively with business in mind. But, these two views contributed to a successful relationship between science and industry. It was this success that influenced Whitney in his vision for the GE Research Lab.

The laboratory began at a time when the American electrification process was in its infant stage. General Electric became the leader of this move toward electrifying the United States and developing new technologies for many other science and technology fields. Willis Whitney and his assistant, Thomas Dempster, were the key researchers in developing the electrical technology that allowed the laboratory to continue to grow. The lab grew from 8 people to 102 people by 1906, which included scientifically trained researchers that made up 40% of the staff. Whitney believed in exploratory scientific research, with the goal of creating new commercial products. These two goals appealed to General Electric. For researchers, the lab provided time and money for experimentation, research, and personal interests without putting a high demand on developing theories or teaching. Nearly 30 years after its founding, the laboratory had expanded the staff to more than 400 chemists, physicists, and electrical engineers, plus their assistants.

=== Early success ===
It took several years for the lab to follow through with the vision to create all original innovations, instead of improving on the inventions already in place. GE's earliest project was perfecting the incandescent light bulb. In 1908, engineer and new head researcher William Coolidge invented the ductile tungsten light bulb filament, providing a more durable and long-lasting light filament than the existing technology. "The invention secured GE's technological leadership in the market and epitomized the role of the GE research lab — bringing innovation to the marketplace." But, that work was still an improvement on existing technology and nothing entirely new. In the coming years, GE scientists earned two Nobel Prizes in chemistry and physics. In 1932, Irving Langmuir won the Nobel Prize in chemistry for his work on surface chemical reactions which helped him develop the gas-filled light bulb in 1916. After patenting many inventions, Langmuir developed his new light bulb which reinvented lights altogether. By 1928, due to Langmuir's innovation, GE held 96% of incandescent light sales in America. That entirely new invention set GE on a path to follow through with Whitney and Rice's vision for the lab.

=== Later history ===
Starting with the success of the incandescent and gas-filled light bulbs, General Electric expanded its research to a range of technological and scientific fields. It strove for commercial goals in any innovation they achieved. Throughout its history, the General Electric Research Laboratory has earned thousands of patents for innovative technology, redefining industries and commercial products.

In 1999, the laboratory became GE Global Research after opening a research center in Bangalore, India. GE later opened research laboratories in Oklahoma, China, Germany, and Brazil, but closed all but the New York and India locations in 2017 as part of cost-cutting measures. GE has expanded its research beyond lighting to appliances, aviation, electrical distribution, energy, healthcare, media & entertainment, oil & gas, transportation, and water, along with numerous other fields. They employ 3,000 employees and continue to bring innovation and technology to the world, the same goal of General Electric that was first proposed by Whitney and Steinmetz.

== Notable historic innovations ==
- 1900: GE Industrial Research Laboratory is established
- 1902: Electric fan
- 1908: Tungsten light bulb filament
- 1910: First electric hotpoint range
- 1916: Gas-filled light bulb
- 1918: Record-capacity water wheel generator at Niagara Falls
- 1918: Trans-oceanic radio system
- 1920: Portable x-ray machine
- 1921: GE turbosupercharger engine helps an aircraft reach a record altitude
- 1921: Magnetron vacuum tube
- 1927: First television brought into the home
- 1941: First U.S. Jet Engine
- 1943: First auto-pilot system
- 1946: Cloud seeding developed
- 1949: The J47 jet engine is developed, which came to be the most produced gas turbine jet engine in history
- 1962: Solid-state laser
- 1969: Key technologies in the first Moon landing
- 1976: Computed Tomography (CT) scanner
- 1983: Signa Magnetic Resonance Imaging system (MRI)
- 2002: Popularization of wind turbines
- 2003: Fuel-efficient Evolution Series locomotive engine
- 2007: First 24 cylinder internal combustion engine

== Notable employees ==
- Ralph Alpher, cosmologist
- LeRoy Apker, solid-state physicist
- George C. Baldwin, theoretical and experimental physicist
- Frank Benford, electrical engineer and physicist best known for rediscovering and generalizing Benford's law
- Hans Bethe, Nobel laureate and theoretical physicist
- Charles Coffin, businessman and engineer
- William David Coolidge, physicist
- Thomas Edison, inventor, scientist and businessman
- Richard Feynman, Nobel laureate and theoretical physicist
- Ivar Giaever, Nobel Laureate and physicist
- Juris Hartmanis, Turing Award for computational complexity theory
- Robert N. Hall, physicist, inventor of the first laser diode
- Nick Holonyak, physicist, inventor of the first visible light laser diode
- Peter T. Kirstein, computer scientist
- Irving Langmuir, Nobel Laureate, chemist and physicist
- David Musser, computer scientist
- Richard E. Stearns, Turing Award for computational complexity theory
- Charles Proteus Steinmetz, mathematician and electrical engineer
- Alexander Stepanov, computer scientist
- Elihu Thomson, engineer and inventor
- Sasikanth Manipatruni, electrical engineer and inventor
- Willis Rodney Whitney, chemist
- Bernard Vonnegut, chemist, discoverer of silver iodide cloud seeding
- Kurt Vonnegut, writer
- Christopher J. Hardy, physicist and technologist Magnetic resonance imaging
- William A. Edelstein, physicist and technologist Magnetic resonance imaging

== See also ==
- Bell Labs
- DuPont
- Industrial laboratory
- Knolls Atomic Power Laboratory
- List of National Historic Landmarks in New York
- Menlo Park, New Jersey
- National Register of Historic Places listings in Schenectady County, New York
- Westinghouse Electric (1886)
