= Knolls Laboratory =

Knolls Laboratory may refer to:

- GE Global Research's Knolls Laboratory, Niskayuna, New York
- Knolls Atomic Power Laboratory, Niskayuna, New York
