= Christopher J. Hardy =

American physicist (born 1955)

- Born: New Jersey
- Citizenship: American
- Education: Princeton University; UIUC
- Known for: Cardiac MR imaging and spectroscopy, NMR pulse design, real-time interactive MRI
- Awards: Fellow, International Society for Magnetic Resonance in Medicine 2010; Fellow APS 2002, Fellow American Institute for medical and biological Engineering 2003; GE Coolidge Fellow, GE Whitney Award 1989, 94, 97, 2005
- Scientific career
- Fields: Applied Physics, Cardiology, Magnetic Resonance Imaging
- Workplaces: GE Global Research
- Academic advisors: William A. Edelstein

Christopher J. Hardy (born 1955) is an American physicist and inventor of several magnetic resonance imaging (MRI) subsystem technologies for use in real time MRI and cardiac MR imaging and spectroscopy.

== Biography ==
Hardy obtained his Ph.D. from the University of Illinois at Urbana-Champaign in March, 1983. He is currently a principal scientist and Coolidge Fellow at General Electric. He developed the first graphical approach that allowed physicians to explore anatomy in real time during cardiac MRI, as opposed to viewing groups of images at a later time, and he also developed a technique that improved imaging speed. Both accomplishments have gained widespread use. He has also led the teams that developed 32 channel and 128 channel General Electric MRI systems.

Hardy has written 98 research papers and 54 patents.

== Awards and honors ==
- 1986, 1993 Inventor of the Year, Eastern New York Patent Law Association
- 1988 Distinguished Inventor, Intellectual Property Owners, Inc. (Washington, DC)
- 1989, 1994, 1997, 2005 GE Whitney Gallery of Technical Achievers / Whitney Award
- 1996 GE Gold Patent Medallion
- 2002 Fellow, American Physical Society
- 2003 Fellow, American Institute for Medical and Biological Engineering
- 2008 Redington Award for Imaging Technologies
- 2010 Fellow, International Society for Magnetic Resonance in Medicine
- 2010 GE Coolidge Fellow
- 2011, 2012 Distinguished Reviewer, Magn Reson Med, J Magn Reson Imag

== Selected works ==
- Edelstein WA, Glover GH, Hardy CJ, Redington RW (August 1986). "The intrinsic signal-to-noise ratio in NMR imaging". Magnetic Resonance in Medicine. 3 (4): 604–18. doi:10.1002/mrm.1910030413. PMID 3747821. S2CID 21480135.
- Weiss RG, Bottomley PA, Hardy CJ, Gerstenblith G (December 1990). "Regional myocardial metabolism of high-energy phosphates during isometric exercise in patients with coronary artery disease". The New England Journal of Medicine. 323 (23): 1593–600. doi:10.1056/NEJM199012063232304. PMID 2233948.
- Zhu Y, Hardy CJ, Sodickson DK, et al. (October 2004). "Highly parallel volumetric imaging with a 32-element RF coil array". Magnetic Resonance in Medicine. 52 (4): 869–77. doi:10.1002/mrm.20209. PMC 2819016. PMID 15389961.
- Hardy CJ, Giaquinto RO, Piel JE, et al. (November 2008). "128-channel body MRI with a flexible high-density receiver-coil array". Journal of Magnetic Resonance Imaging. 28 (5): 1219–25. doi:10.1002/jmri.21463. PMID 18972330. S2CID 20394600.

== Selected patents ==
- Hardy, Christopher J, "Method for calculating wave velocities in blood vessels"
- L. Marinelli, CJ Hardy, "Method for reconstructing images"
- Hardy, C.J. and Sasikanth Manipatruni, General Electric Co, 2014. Photonic system and method for optical data transmission in medical imaging systems. U.S. Patent 8,847,598.
