= Focal spot blooming =

Focal spot blooming is the unwanted change in the focal spot size of an X-ray tube during change in exposure.

== Cause ==
Focal spot blooming is caused due to increased mAs. When high exposure setting are used, the electron beam from the cathode fail to focus on a particular point because of electrostatic repulsion.
