= Keren Bergman =

American electrical engineer and professor

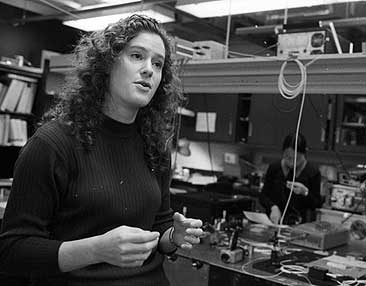
- Bergman in 1998
- Education: Bucknell University; Massachusetts Institute of Technology
- Awards: Optical Society Fellow (2003); Institute of Electrical and Electronics Engineers Fellow (2009); IEEE Photonics Engineering Award (2016)
- Scientific career
- Fields: Electrical engineering
- Workplaces: Columbia University
- Thesis: Quantum noise reduction with pulsed light in optical fibers (1994)
- Doctoral advisor: Hermann A. Haus
- Doctoral students: Odile Liboiron-Ladouceur

Keren Bergman is an American electrical engineer who is the Charles Batchelor Professor at Columbia University. She also serves as the director of the Lightwave Research Laboratory, a silicon photonics research group at Columbia University. Her research focuses on nano-photonics and particularly optical interconnects for low power, high bandwidth computing applications.

== Education and career ==
Bergman received a B.S. in electrical engineering from Bucknell University in 1988. She received a M.S. in Electrical Engineering in 1991, and a PhD in 1994, from the Massachusetts Institute of Technology. During her graduate work at MIT, she worked with Hermann A. Haus, researching "quantum noise reduction and soliton propagation in optical fibers."

Bergman was an assistant professor of electrical engineering at Princeton from 1994 to 2000. During this time, she led a project funded by NASA and the NSA to test components of an optical communications network for supercomputing.

Bergman went to Columbia as an associate professor of electrical engineering in 2001 and became director of its Lightwave Research Laboratory in 2002. According to her member biography from OSTI's Advanced Scientific Computing Advisory Committee (of which she was a member from 2016 to 2019),

As director of the Lightwave Research Laboratory she leads multiple research programs on optical interconnection networks for advanced computing systems, data centers, optical packet-switched routers, and chip multiprocessor nanophotonic networks-on-chip.

In 2019 a team led by Bergman won a $4.8 million DARPA grant to support the development of a new class of on-chip optical interconnects that scale performance without increasing energy costs.

Returning to the lab in July 2020, after a hiatus caused by COVID-19, Bergman told Columbia Engineering News that her team used the break to find new ways to do informal interactions as well as remote data analysis.

== Awards and honors ==
In 2003 she was named a Fellow of The Optical Society "for seminal contributions to quantum noise reduction and soliton pulse generation".

She was named a Fellow of the Institute of Electrical and Electronics Engineers in 2009 "for contributions to development of optical interconnection and transport networks".

Bergman also won the 2016 IEEE Photonics Society Engineering Achievement Award "[f]or pioneering contributions to optical interconnection networks and photonic-enabled architectures that advance communications and computing systems."

== Selected publications ==
- Shacham, Assaf; Bergman, Keren; Carloni, Luca P. (September 2008). "Photonic Networks-on-Chip for Future Generations of Chip Multiprocessors". IEEE Transactions on Computers. 57 (9): 1246–1260. doi:10.1109/TC.2008.78. S2CID 6827334.
- Neuman, Keir; Chadd EH; Liou GF; Bergman K; Block, Steven M. (1999). "Characterization of photodamage to Escherichia coli in optical traps". Biophysical Journal. 77 (5): 2856–2863. doi:10.1016/s0006-3495(99)77117-1. PMC 1300557. PMID 10545383. Wikidata Q30539000.
- Sherwood-Droz, Nicolás; Wang, Howard; Chen, Long; Lee, Benjamin G.; Biberman, Aleksandr; Bergman, Keren; Lipson, Michal (September 29, 2008). "Optical 4x4 hitless slicon router for optical networks-on-chip (NoC)". Optics Express. 16 (20): 15915–15922. Bibcode:2008OExpr..1615915S. doi:10.1364/OE.16.015915. PMID 18825228.
- Shacham, Assaf; Bergman, Keren; Carloni, Luca P. (May 2007). "On the Design of a Photonic Network-on-Chip". First International Symposium on Networks-on-Chip (NOCS'07). pp. 53–64. doi:10.1109/NOCS.2007.35. ISBN 978-0-7695-2773-4. S2CID 1779566.
- Stern, Brian; Zhu, Xiaoliang; Chen, Christine P.; Tzuang, Lawrence D.; Cardenas, Jaime; Bergman, Keren; Lipson, Michal (June 20, 2015). "On-chip mode-division multiplexing switch". Optica. 2 (6): 530. Bibcode:2015Optic...2..530S. doi:10.1364/OPTICA.2.000530.
- Biberman, A., Sasikanth Manipatruni, Ophir, N., Chen, L., Lipson, M. and Bergman, K., 2010. First demonstration of long-haul transmission using silicon microring modulators. Optics express, 18(15), pp. 15544-15552.
