= GE Aerospace Research =

Research and development division of GE Aerospace

Coordinates: 42°49′38″N 73°52′41″W

- Type: Division
- Industry: Technological research
- Founded: 1900; 126 years ago
- Headquarters: Niskayuna, New York, United States
- Parent: General Electric (1917–2024); GE Aerospace (2024–present)
- Website: www.geaerospace.com/company/research

GE Aerospace Research, formerly GE Research, is the research and development division of GE Aerospace. Before 2024, it was a division of the General Electric Company, which split three ways between 2023 and 2024 and pivoted to aviation.

GE Global Research locations include the Global Research Center in Niskayuna, New York, established as the General Electric Research Laboratory in Schenectady in 1900 and relocated to Niskayuna in 1955 (this site is also known as the Knolls Laboratory, to distinguish it from the original Schenectady location – it is adjacent to the Knolls Atomic Power Laboratory), and the John F. Welch Technology Centre in Bangalore, India, established in 2000.

== Notable employees ==
Researchers at GE Global Research include:

- Ralph Alpher, cosmologist
- William David Coolidge, physicist
- Ivar Giaever, Nobel Laureate, physicist
- Juris Hartmanis, Turing Award winner, computer scientist
- Christopher J. Hardy, industrial physicist
- Irving Langmuir, Nobel Laureate, chemist and physicist
- James L. Lawson, physicist
- David Musser, computer scientist
- James Rumbaugh, computer scientist
- Charles Proteus Steinmetz, mathematician and electrical engineer
- Alexander Stepanov, computer scientist
- Richard Stearns, Turing Award winner, computer scientist
- Willis Rodney Whitney, chemist
- Carl Woese, biophysicist

== Former locations ==
GE Global Research operations at all locations other than Niskayuna and Bangalore were discontinued in 2017 as part of a cost-cutting program of General Electric:

- Shanghai, China, 2000–2017, now GE's China Technology Center operated by business units.
- Munich, Germany, 2003–2017, now GE's European Technology Center operated by business units and also home of GE Additive's Customer Experience Center.
- Rio de Janeiro, Brazil, 2014–2017, now GE's Brazil Technology Center operated by business units.
- Oil and Gas Technology Center, Oklahoma City, Oklahoma, 2014–2017, only GE research center to focus on one industry, now part of Baker Hughes.
- Saudi Technology and Innovation Center in Dhahran, Saudi Arabia, established in 2013, focuses on Material Characterization, Combustion & Fuels, and Data Analytics.
- Advanced Manufacturing and Software Technology Center in Van Buren, Michigan, established in 2011, focuses on Advanced Manufacturing, Software, and IT.
- Israel Technology Center in Tirat Carmel, Israel, established in 2011, focuses on Healthcare, Energy, Software Analytics, Cyber Security, and Advanced Manufacturing.
