= John F. Welch Technology Centre =

Research center in Whitefield, Bengaluru

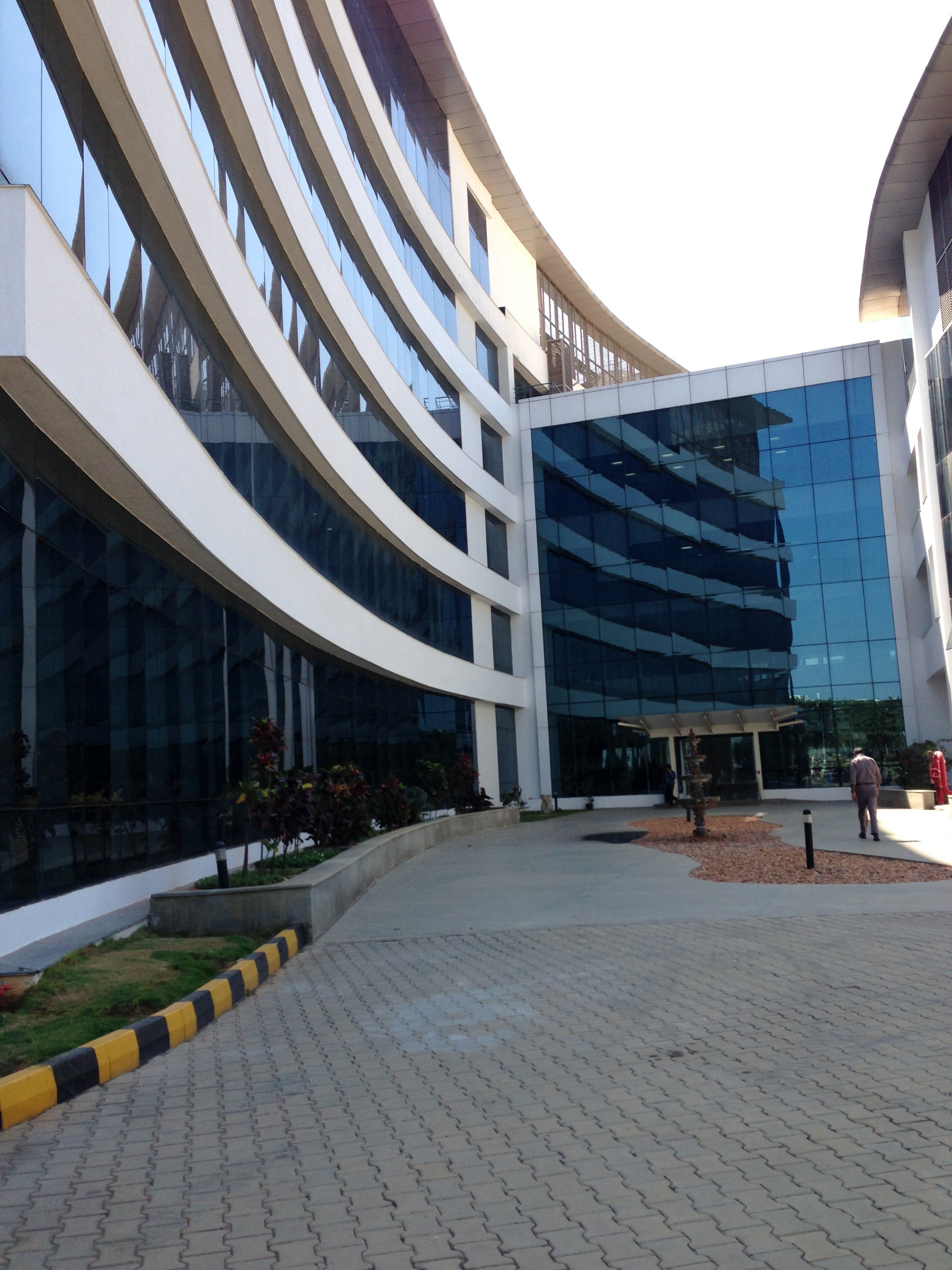
- Front entrance
- Abbreviation: JFWTC
- Formation: September 17, 2000; 26 years ago
- Founder: John F. Welch
- Headquarters: Whitefield, Bengaluru, India
- Managing Director: Alok Nanda
- Parent organization: General Electric
- Staff: >4,000

The John F. Welch Technology Centre (JFWTC) is the formal name of the GE Global Research and technology development site located in Whitefield, Bengaluru. The JFWTC is General Electric's (GE) first and largest integrated, multidisciplinary research and development center outside the US. The center is also known as Bangalore Engineering Center or BEC. The team has more than 5,000 engineers and scientists working at the JFWTC Bangalore. It was founded by former CEO of GE John F. Welch on 17 September 2000.

Alok Nanda is the current Managing Director of JFWTC.
