= Ehsan Afshari =

American electrical engineer

- Known for: Terahertz Integrated Circuits
- Awards: Presidential Award of National Best Engineering Student, Awarded by the President of Iran (2000); Defense Advanced Research Projects Agency (DARPA) Young Faculty Award (2008); National Science Foundation (NSF) Early CAREER Award (2010); Selected as one of 50 Most Distinguished Alumni of Sharif University (2016)

Academic background
- Education: Sharif University of Technology; California Institute of Technology

Ehsan Afshari is an Iranian-American electrical engineer, researcher and academic. He is Professor of Electrical and Computer Engineering at University of Michigan.

Afshari's research is focused on high frequency circuits and systems for imaging, bio-sensing, and high data rate communications. He has written over 150 papers. He was the recipient of the 2008 DAPRA Young Faculty Award and the 2010 NSF Early CAREER Award.

== Education ==
Afshari received a B.Sc. in electrical engineering from Sharif University of Technology in 2001. He then moved to the United States, where he joined California Institute of Technology, completing his M.Sc. in electrical engineering in 2003 and his Ph.D. in electrical engineering in 2006.

== Career ==
After completing his Ph.D., Afshari joined Cornell University as an assistant professor, becoming associate professor in 2012. In 2016, he joined University of Michigan as an associate professor of Electrical and Computer Engineering. In 2019, he became full professor at University of Michigan.

As a result of his research, Afshari co-founded Airvine and Lassenpeak.

Afshari has been an advisor to many PhD students that became faculty members at major universities.

=== Research and work ===
After completing his Ph.D., Afshari changed his research focus to terahertz circuits and systems. When he began research in this area, most of the terahertz systems used expensive and bulky devices such as quantum cascade lasers. Starting from 2010, Afshari's team started to develop circuit blocks and systems operating at terahertz frequencies using conventional transistor technologies. One of the early milestones of his group was the design and fabrication of the first integrated oscillator operating above 400 GHz which generated more than 100 uW of power. At the time of design, this oscillator generated three orders of magnitude higher power compared to prior art.

His team has continued advancing the terahertz electronics research and have designed the first terahertz voltage controlled oscillator (VCO), the first 2-dimensional terahertz phased array, the highest frequency active multiplier, the first fully integrated frequency modulated continuous wave (FMCW) radar operating above 200 GHz, and the first phase-locked terahertz imaging transceiver chipset all based on standard Si/SiGe technologies. Aside from these designs, Afshari's team has been active in other areas of research including but not limited to low-phase-noise radio-frequency VCO's, high-power and power-efficient mm-wave oscillators, and non-boolean pattern recognition circuits.

== Awards and honors ==
- 2000 - Presidential Award of National Best Engineering Student, Awarded by the President of Iran
- 2004 - Dr. Dimitri Award of Excellence in Engineering Education Association of Professors and Scholars of Iranian Heritage (APSIH)
- 2004 - Best Paper Award in the IEEE Custom Integrated Circuits Conference (CICC)
- 2008 - Selected to the Cornell's First Faculty Institute for Diversity
- 2008 - Defense Advanced Research Projects Agency (DARPA) Young Faculty Award
- 2010 - National Science Foundation (NSF) Early CAREER Award
- 2016 - IEEE Solid-State Circuit Society Distinguished Lecturer
- 2016 - Selected as one of 50 Most Distinguished Alumni of Sharif University
- 2019 - Best Invited Paper, IEEE Custom Integrated Circuits Conference (CICC)

== Selected publications ==
- Afshari, E., & Hajimiri, A. (2005). Nonlinear transmission lines for pulse shaping in silicon. IEEE Journal of Solid-State Circuits, 40(3), 744–752.
- Afshari, E., Bhat, H., Li, X., & Hajimiri, A. (2006). Electrical funnel: A broadband signal combining method. 2006 IEEE International Solid State Circuits Conference - Digest of Technical Papers.
- Han, R., Zhang, Y., Kim, Y., Kim, D. Y., Shichijo, H., Afshari, E., & Kenneth, O. (2012). 280 GHz and 860 GHz image sensors using Schottky-barrier diodes in 0.13μm digital CMOS. 2012 IEEE International Solid-State Circuits Conference.
- Han, R., Zhang, Y., Kim, Y., Kim, D. Y., Shichijo, H., Afshari, E., & O, K. K. (2013). Active Terahertz Imaging Using Schottky Diodes in CMOS: Array and 860-GHz Pixel. IEEE Journal of Solid-State Circuits, 48(10), 2296–2308.
- Han, R., & Afshari, E. (2013). A CMOS High-Power Broadband 260-GHz Radiator Array for Spectroscopy. IEEE Journal of Solid-State Circuits, 48(12), 3090–3104.
- Han, R., Jiang, C., Mostajeran, A., Emadi, M., Aghasi, H., Sherry, H., ... Afshari, E. (2015). A SiGe Terahertz Heterodyne Imaging Transmitter With 3.3 mW Radiated Power and Fully-Integrated Phase-Locked Loop. IEEE Journal of Solid-State Circuits, 50(12), 2935–2947.
- Li, G., Tousi, Y. M., Hassibi, A., & Afshari, E. (2009). Delay-Line-Based Analog-to-Digital Converters. IEEE Transactions on Circuits and Systems II: Express Briefs, 56(6), 464–468.
- Momeni, O., & Afshari, E. (2011). High Power Terahertz and Millimeter-Wave Oscillator Design: A Systematic Approach. IEEE Journal of Solid-State Circuits, 46(3), 583–597.
- Tousi, Y. M., Momeni, O., & Afshari, E. (2012). A Novel CMOS High-Power Terahertz VCO Based on Coupled Oscillators: Theory and Implementation. IEEE Journal of Solid-State Circuits, 47(12), 3032–3042.
- Tousi, Y. M., Momeni, O., & Afshari, E. (2012). A 283-to-296 GHz VCO with 0.76 mW peak output power in 65 nm CMOS. 2012 IEEE International Solid-State Circuits Conference.
- Pourahmad, V., Sasikanth Manipatruni Nikonov, D., Young, I. and Afshari, E., 2017. Nonboolean pattern recognition using chains of coupled CMOS oscillators as discriminant circuits. IEEE Journal on Exploratory Solid-State Computational Devices and Circuits, 3, pp. 1–9.
