= Gary H. Glover =

American electrical engineer

Gary H. Glover is an American electrical engineer.

Glover graduated from the University of Minnesota with bachelor's, master's, and doctoral degrees in electrical engineering, then worked for General Electric for two decades before joining the Stanford University faculty.

Glover was elected a fellow of the American Institute for Medical and Biological Engineering in 1997, and a member of the United States National Academy of Engineering in 2006.
