= Gerrit E. W. Bauer =

Physicist at Tohoku University

- Scientific career
- Institutions: Tohoku University

Gerrit E. W. Bauer is a physicist and Professor and Principal Investigator at Tohoku University. He is one of the top highly-cited researchers (h>100) according to webometrics.
