= Luca Carloni =

Computer scientist and professor

Luca P. Carloni
- Education: University of Bologna; University of California, Berkeley
- Scientific career
- Fields: Computer Science; Computer-Aided Design; System-on-Chip; Heterogeneous Computing; System-Level Design; Networks-on-Chip; Embedded Systems
- Workplaces: Columbia University; Columbia Engineering
- Thesis: Latency-Insensitive Design (2004)
- Doctoral advisor: Alberto Sangiovanni-Vincentelli
- Website: www.cs.columbia.edu\~luca

Luca P. Carloni is a professor and chair of the Department of Computer Science at Columbia University in the City of New York. He has been on the faculty at Columbia since 2004. He is an international expert on electronic computer-aided design.

He has made research contributions to methodologies and tools for system-on-chip platforms, heterogeneous computing, system-level design, networks-on-chip, and embedded systems.

He proposed and developed Embedded Scalable Platforms (ESP), an open-source research platform to address the complexity challenges of the design and programming of heterogeneous system-on-chip architectures.

Luca was selected as an Alfred P. Sloan Research fellow in 2008 and as an IEEE fellow in 2017. He has received the Faculty Early Career Development Award from National Science Foundation in 2006, ONR Young Investigator Award in 2010, and the IEEE CEDA Early Career Award in 2012

He published over 180 scientific papers and received the Best Paper Award at IEEE Workshop on High Performance Embedded Computing (HPEC) in 2007, Design, Automation & Test in Europe Conference & Exhibition (DATE) in 2012, IEEE International Conference on Cloud Computing Technology and Science (CloudCom) in 2012, and ACM/IEEE Workshop on Machine Learning for CAD (MLCAD) in 2020. His work on Latency-Insensitive Design has been selected in the Best of ICCAD – 20 Years of Excellence in Computer-Aided Design in 2003.

== Biography ==
=== Education ===
Luca received his bachelor's degree in Electronics Engineering at Università di Bologna in 1995 and his Ph.D. in Electrical Engineering and Computer Sciences at University of California, Berkeley in 2004. His dissertation on Latency-Insensitive Design was supervised by Dr. Alberto Sangiovanni-Vincentelli.

=== Career ===
Luca joined the faculty of the Columbia University of the City of New York as an assistant professor in 2004. He was promoted to the rank of associate professor in 2009 and to the rank of full professor in 2017.

He is currently the Department Chair of Computer Science at Columbia.

Luca is an associate editor of the IEEE Transactions on Computers, the IEEE Transactions on Computer-Aided Design of Integrated Circuits and Systems, and the ACM Transactions in Embedded Computing Systems. He has served on the technical program committee and as the chair of many conferences, including Design Automation Conference, Design, Automation & Test in Europe, NOCS, and ESWeek

Luca participates in multiple research projects including DECADE. He leads the System-Level Design Group and is a member of the Data Science Institute at Columbia University.

== Honors and awards ==
- Faculty Early Career Development Award from National Science Foundation (2006)
- Alfred P. Sloan Research fellow (2008)
- ONR Young Investigator Award (2010)
- IEEE CEDA Early Career Award (2012)
- DATE (Design, Automation & Test in Europe) Best Paper Award (2012)
- IEEE Fellow (2017)
- ACM Fellow (2025)
