= Alyssa Apsel =

American electrical engineer

Alyssa B. Apsel is an American electrical engineer whose research involves the design and analysis of integrated circuits that combine information from electrical, optical, and radio-frequency channels, including CMOS-based optoelectronics, low-power asynchronous analog-to-digital converters as an interface to the internet of things, and implantable radio devices for body area networks. She is the IBM Professor of Engineering and director of the School of Electrical and Computer Engineering at Cornell University.

== Education and career ==
Apsel majored in electrical engineering at Swarthmore College, graduating in 1995. After earning a master's degree at the California Institute of Technology in 1996, she completed a Ph.D. in electrical engineering at Johns Hopkins University in 2002. Her dissertation, Optoelectronic Receivers in Silicon on Sapphire CMOS: Architecture and Design for Efficient Parallel Interconnects, was supervised by Andreas Andreou.

She joined Cornell University as an assistant professor of electrical and computer engineering in 2002. She was promoted to associate professor in 2008. She became director of Electrical and Computer Engineering in 2018, and was named the IBM Professor of Engineering in 2023.

== Book ==
Apsel is a coauthor of the book Design of Ultra-Low Power Impulse Radios (with Xiao Wang and Rajeev Dokania, Springer, 2014).

== Recognition ==
Apsel was a distinguished lecturer of the IEEE Circuits and Systems Society for 2018–2019. She was named an IEEE Fellow, in the 2020 class of fellows, "for contributions to radio frequency and optical communications circuits and systems".
