= ITFET =

The inverted-T field-effect transistor (ITFET) is a type of field effect transistor invented by Leo Mathew at Freescale Semiconductor. Part of the device extends vertically from the horizontal plane in an inverted T shape, hence the name.
