= Lane W. Martin =

American materials scientist

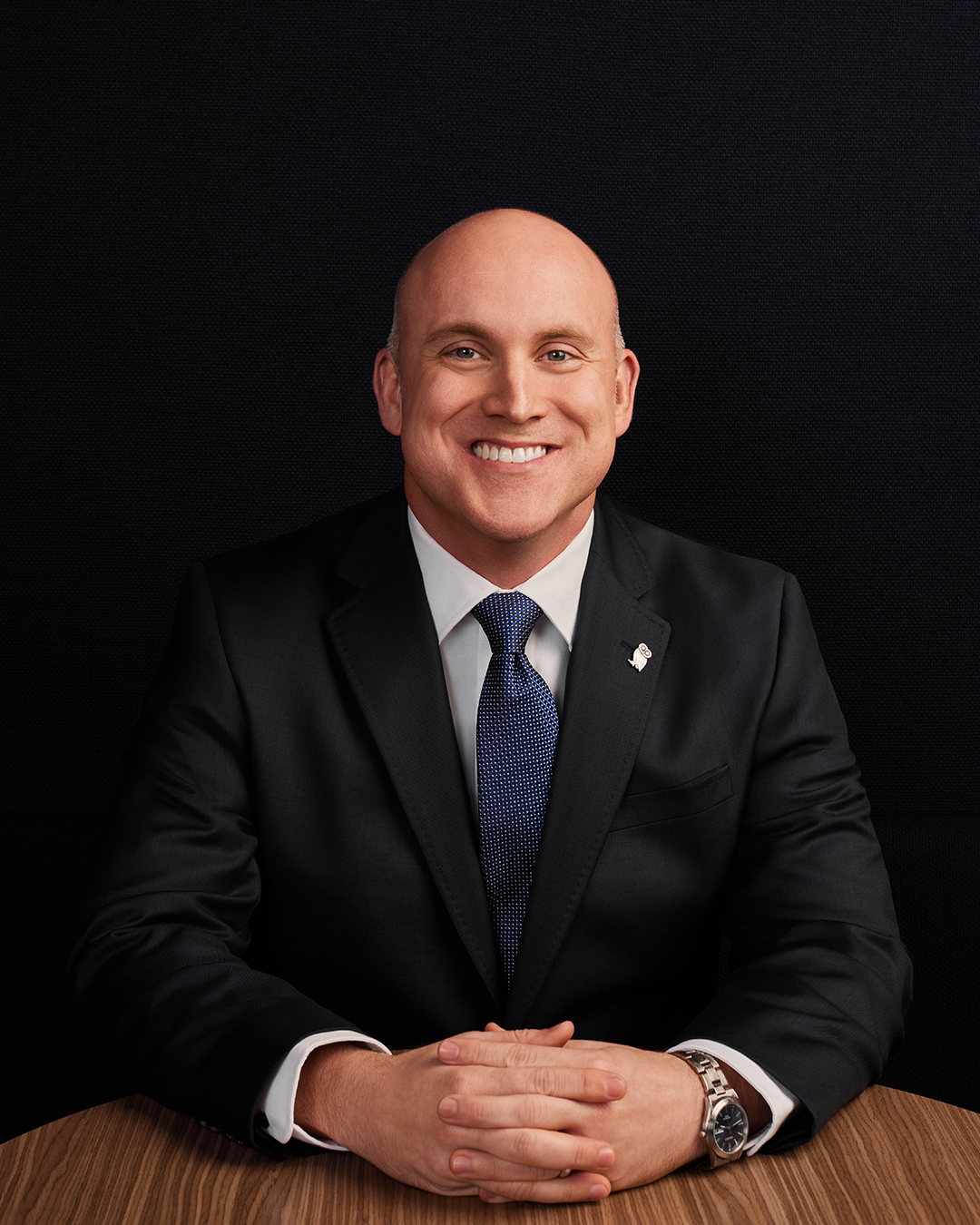
- Inaugural Director of the Rice Advanced Materials Institute
- Born: Lincoln, Nebraska, US
- Known for: Complex-oxide thin films Ferroelectrics, Multiferroics; Functional Materials
- Spouse: Sophi
- Children: Stanley
- Awards: Presidential Early Career Award for Scientists and Engineers

Academic background
- Education: Carnegie Mellon University (BS); University of California, Berkeley (MS, PhD)
- Thesis: Engineering multiferroic materials and new functionalities in materials (2008)
- Doctoral advisor: Ramamoorthy Ramesh

Lane Wyatt Martin is an American materials scientist and engineer specializing in complex oxide thin films, their physics and properties, and applications of the same. He is best known for his work on ferroelectric and multiferroic thin films. Currently he is a Robert A. Welch Professor of Materials Science and NanoEngineering, Chemistry, and Physics and Astronomy, and serves as the director of the Rice Advanced Materials Institute (RAMI) at Rice University.

== Early life and education ==
Martin was born in Lincoln, Nebraska and grew up primarily in Indiana, Pennsylvania and graduated from Indiana Area Senior High School. He earned his Bachelor of Science in Materials Science and Engineering from Carnegie Mellon University in December 2003 in just three-and-half years. He then pursued graduate studies at the University of California, Berkeley, obtaining a Master of Science (M.S., May 2006) and a Doctor of Philosophy (Ph.D., May 2008) in Materials Science and Engineering.

== Career ==
Early Career

After completing his doctorate degree, Martin served as a postdoctoral fellow in the Quantum Materials Program at Lawrence Berkeley National Laboratory from 2008 to 2009. He began his academic career as an assistant professor in the Department of Materials Science and Engineering at the University of Illinois, Urbana-Champaign. As an assistant professor of materials science and engineering, Martin received a National Science Foundation CAREER Award for his proposal, "Enhanced Pyroelectric and Electrocaloric Effects in Complex Oxide Thin Film Heterostructures." He also helped devise a method to make thin films of ferroelectric material with twice the strain of traditional methods, giving the films exceptional electric properties. In 2013, Martin was nominated for a Presidential Early Career Award for Scientists and Engineers by the United States Department of Defense "for his research accomplishments in the synthesis and study of multifunctional materials that have enabled the development and understanding of fundamentally new materials phenomena and potential for advanced devices."

UC Berkeley

In 2014, Martin returned to the University of California, Berkeley as an associate professor, was promoted to professor in July 2018, and served as vice chair and associate chair of the Department of Materials Science and Engineering from 2018 to 2021. From 2021 to 2023, Martin was a Chancellor's Professor and chair of the Department of Materials Science and Engineering at the University of California, Berkeley.

While serving in this role, he received the 2015 American Associate for Crystal Growth Young Author Award for his "outstanding accomplishments in the heteroepitaxial crystal growth of complex oxide thin films." He also received the 2016 Robert L. Coble Award for Young Scholars from the American Ceramic Society for outstanding contributions in ceramics research. In 2021, Martin was elected to the American Physical Society for his seminal contributions to the science of ferroelectrics. During his tenure as chair, The University of California, Berkeley's Materials Science and Engineering (MSE) program was consistently ranked among the top in the nation. In the 2023 U.S. News & World Report rankings, the program was tied for the #2 position.

Rice University and the Rice Advanced Materials Institute (RAMI)

Martin joined Rice University in July 2023 as the Robert A. Welch Professor of Materials Science and NanoEngineering, Chemistry, and Physics and Astronomy and as inaugural director of the Rice Advanced Materials Institute (RAMI), a leading hub for interdisciplinary research in advanced materials. RAMI brings together experts from materials science, chemistry, physics, and engineering to address pressing global challenges through innovations in material design and application. Under Martin's leadership, the institute focuses on exploring a diverse array of materials to enable transformative advances in areas such as next-generation, low-power electronics and communications, energy storage and conversion, and catalysis, separations, storage, and beyond while fostering collaboration across academic, industry, and governmental sectors. RAMI aims to advance the frontiers of science while promoting sustainable and impactful technological solutions, solidifying Rice University's position as a global leader in materials research.

== Research ==
Martin's research focuses on the design and characterization of functional materials, particularly dielectric, piezoelectric, pyroelectric, ferroelectric, and multiferroic materials. His research focuses on the synthesis (growth), characterization, and utilization of emergent functions in such materials, particularly in epitaxial thin-film materials. By applying innovative approaches to making materials, he is able to access new states of matter and explores fundamental materials physics through growth and epitaxy, strain, defect, and interfacial engineering. In turn, his work explores the unique properties of these materials, including their ability to generate electric charge under mechanical stress and change physical dimensions when subjected to an electric field. Dr. Martin investigates the fundamental mechanisms governing the behavior of these materials at the atomic scale, aiming to enhance their performance for a wide range of applications. His research has significant implications for energy harvesting and conversion, advanced sensors, next-generation logic, and data-storage technologies, addressing global challenges in energy efficiency and the development of sustainable technologies.

Throughout his career, Martin has made significant contributions to understanding how to produce unexpected properties and phenomena in ferroelectrics materials. For example, his team used strain gradients induced by compositional gradients to induce built-in potentials that can give rise to properties not found in the bulk. Using similar approaches his team greatly expanded the range of functional temperatures for a given ferroelectric system by creating polarization gradients. In this work, the team directly measured the gradient and found that expanded the temperature range for optimal performance by the material across a 500-degree Celsius window (nearly an order of magnitude larger as compared to standard materials).

In other systems, Martin's ability to finely control materials - at the unit cell level - has led to him and colleague discovering new states of matter in layered versions of materials. For example, by layering a ferroelectric and a dielectric repeatedly (with just each layer being a few nanometers thick), it was found that totally unexpected polarization textures could be formed including so-called polar vortices and polar skyrmions. These emergent features are topologically protected states that were not expected to form and it was only due to the team's ability to control materials at these exacting sizes that such effects could be produced. In turn, these emergent structures exhibit a range of novel properties and respond in intriguing ways under excitation including being highly light sensitive and can undergo dramatic evolution of the phases under the same.

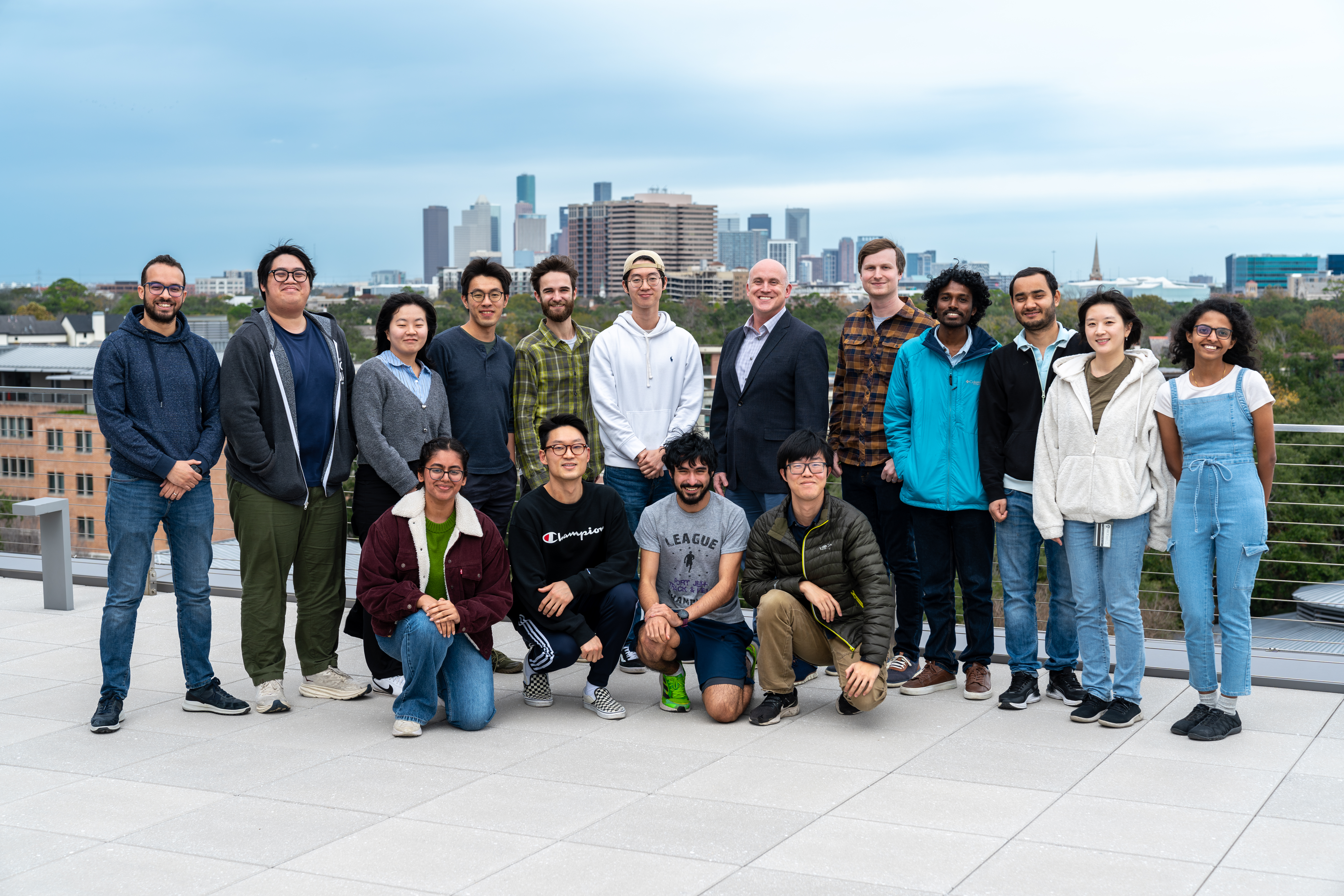
The Martin Research Group - January 2025 at Rice University

The materials Martin works on are being widely considered for an array of applications and devices. Among other contributions, he has helped developed pathways to reduce the energy costs for and speed up the switching of ferroelectric materials which could enable their more ready utilization in logic and memory applications. Likewise, Martin has developed ways to make such materials with properties rarely obtained in thin films - again showing a pathway to potential low-power logic and memory applications. Martin has also demonstrated how the same classes of materials could be useful for everything from waste-heat energy conversion via a process called pyroelectric energy conversion to solid-state capacitive energy storage good for pulsed energy needs, and even worked to develop new understanding of fuel cell materials. His work on relaxor ferroelectrics and antiferroelectrics are also bringing new understanding about how these materials look and respond to field. In the former, among other contributions, he and his colleagues developed new understanding of the nanoscale structure of these materials and how this relates to their properties and in the latter, he demonstrated that an electric-field-driven phase transition in these materials results in a large volume change that can be used actuation. Both of these classes of materials are being considered for applications in micro- and nano-electromechanical systems. As of Jan. 2025, Martin has authored over 300 papers, with his work cited approximately 32,500 times, resulting in an h-index of 81.

== Awards and honors ==
- 2004: William T. Lankford Jr. Memorial Scholarship, Carnegie Mellon University
- 2006: Gold Medal Award Winner, Materials Research Society Graduate Student Award
- 2006: Sapphire Award Winner, Graduate Excellence in Materials Science (GEMS), Materials Science and Technology Meeting
- 2004 - 2007: National Science Foundation IGERT Fellow in Nanoscience and Engineering
- 2007 - 2008: Intel Robert Noyce Fellow in Microelectronics
- 2008: Berkeley Summer Institute for Preparing Future Faculty - Institute Fellow
- 2010: Army Research Office Young Investigator Program (YIP) Award Winner
- 2012: National Science Foundation CAREER Award
- 2013: Dean's Award for Excellence in Research, College of Engineering, University of Illinois
- 2015: American Association for Crystal Growth (AACG) Young Author Award
- 2016: Robert L. Coble Award for Young Scholars, American Ceramic Society
- 2017: Excellence in Laboratory Safety Grand Prize, UC Berkeley Environmental, Health, and Safety (EHS)
- 2018: Dow Lecturer, Department of Materials Science and Engineering, Northwestern University
- 2018 & 2019: Highly Cited Researcher – Ranked in the top 1% by citations for field and publication year in Web of Science
- 2019: IEEE-Ultrasonics, Ferroelectrics, and Frequency Control (UFFC) Society Ferroelectrics Young Investigator Award
- 2019: Zeiss ORION NanoFab Prize, Carl Zeiss SMT, Inc. (for innovative work on using ion beams to control material properties and the demonstration of the value of the NanoFab)
- 2021: Fellow, American Physical Society (APS, Awarded to no-more than one-half of one percent of Society membership) – For "seminal contributions to the science of ferroelectrics"
- 2022: Distinguished Lecturer, Department of Electrical and Computer Engineering, Texas A&M University
- 2022: Advanced Materials Hall of Fame, "Thin-film Ferroelectrics" (showcasing the outstanding achievements of leading international researchers in the field of materials science)
- 2022: Fellow, American Ceramics Society (ACerS, Awarded for outstanding contributions to the ceramic sciences and broad and productive scholarship in ceramic science and technology)
- 2022 - 2024: Defense Science Study Group (DSSG), Institute for Defense Analyses (IDA) and Defense Advanced Research Projects Agency (DARPA)
- 2024: Fellow, Materials Research Society (MRS, Awarded for seminal contributions to the science of ferroelectric and multiferroic thin film materials)

== Personal life ==
Martin and his wife Sophi have one son together.
