= Willis R. Whitney =

American chemist (1868–1958)

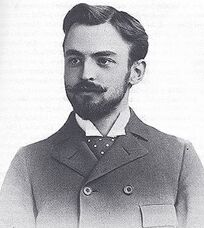
- Whitney as a MIT faculty member
- Born: August 11, 1868; Jamestown, New York, U.S.
- Died: January 9, 1958 (aged 89); Schenectady, New York, U.S.
- Education: Massachusetts Institute of Technology
- Known for: General Electric Company
- Spouse: Evelyn Jones Whitney
- Children: Evelyn Van Alstyne Schermerhorn
- Awards: Willard Gibbs Award (1916); Perkin Medal (1921); IEEE Edison Medal (1934); Public Welfare Medal (1937); John Fritz Medal (1943); IRI Medal (1946)
- Scientific career
- Fields: chemistry, inorganic chemistry, electrochemistry

Willis Rodney Whitney (August 22, 1868 – January 9, 1958) was an American chemist and founder of the research laboratory of the General Electric Company. He is known as the "father of industrial research" in the United States for blending the worlds of research and industry together; which at the time, were two very distinct careers. He is also known for his corrosion theory of iron which he developed after studying at M.I.T. and the University of Leipzig. Whitney was also a professor at M.I.T. for some time before his career transition into research directing. He received many awards, including the Willard Gibbs medal, the Franklin medal, the Perkin medal, the Edison medal, the John Fritz medal, the Chandler medal, and many others. He was an astute believer in researching and experimenting for pleasure and voiced his belief at various science conferences.

== Personal life ==
Whitney was born in Jamestown, New York, the son of John Jay Whitney and Agnes (nee Reynolds) Whitney. He had a sister named Caroline Whitney Barrett. Whitney was curious from the very start. He would wonder why things were the way that they were and often performed various experiments at home. Notably, he wondered why bark grew stronger on one side of trees, what pigeon talons looked like compared to chicken talons, and how things looked like at a microscopic scale. His curiosity of the microscopic was driven by a free YMCA class he attended with his friends. The class taught by William C.J. Hall, a millowner in Jamestown, showed the boys how to prepare specimens and use an optical microscope.

Whitney also learned from his father, a furniture maker and business owner, how to make and use a ledger. He and his friends started a junk-collecting business, going around town collecting scraps. They would wait until the market price rose for scrap and then sell them for a profit. Whitney and his friends eventually invested in bicycles with their saved allowances to maximize their business's reach. He would also often work for his father in his father's factory.

Whitney attended Jamestown Free School as a young boy. One day, he met Evelyn Jones on their way to class. She had lost a nickel in the tall grass and was crying that she could not find it. Whitney stopped and helped her find it. Gradually the two spent more and more time together. Whitney decided that he would get a bicycle to go on rides with her; however the bicycle cost nearly the same as a microscope he had hoped to get. He ended up getting the microscope first and then the bicycle. Eventually the two became husband and wife. They had a daughter named Evelyn "Ennin" (nee Whitney) Van Alstyne Schermerhorn. She was born on May 13, 1892.

As a child, Whitney was Presbyterian and very religious. His formal religion started to fade as he read the likes of Mark Twain, but he kept his faith until his death. He would teach Sunday school in Boston's Chinatown during his time as a student at M.I.T.

Whitney's father died in his sleep after several months of being ill. Upon hearing the news, he returned from an American Chemical Society conference in California and went to comfort his mother, who was slowly going blind. Attending the funeral, he found his mother very calm and serene after she completely lost her sight. Whitney began visiting her more often, until she died in 1927.

Whitney got to meet the likes of Madame Curie, Thomas Edison, Robert Millikan, and Arthur Compton when he was invited to a luncheon honoring Marie Curie at the Carnegie Mansion. Soon after this, he met J.J. Thomson on a trip to Cambridge University in Europe and also got to see Madame Curie's laboratory.

As he retired, Whitney spent more time on his hobbies: bicycling, his various experiments, collecting arrowheads, and learning such as studying neurology and welding for fun.

During the depression years starting in 1929, Whitney battled a personal depression brought on by ever-increasing pressure to defend his laboratory. He had to let go of many of his workers and was devastated that he could not help them. Businesses were debating whether a research budget was actually a cool insurance or an unnecessary luxury. The integrity of the G.E. Research laboratory as a scientific institution was challenged. Whitney took a vacation to recover. During his vacation time, he did some manual labor around his home, visited Florida, visited the Grimaldi Caves, visited Nassau, and learned that when living conches are scarred, a pearl-like lime substance will fill in the scarred area. When he returned, he stepped down from his position as the director of the G.E. laboratory, naming Coolidge as his successor. He was diagnosed with psychomotor acceleration around this time. He recovered and relapsed through it until his death in a hospital at the age of 89.

== Education ==
=== M.I.T. ===
Whitney initially wanted to study biology and by chance visited M.I.T. on the same day that entrance examinations were being administered. He was curious about the questions and got permission to take the exam that day. He passed without any preparation. He would later choose MIT to be his academic institution on account of its laboratories. Whitney was a hard-working student but he was fearful of having a limited scope of knowledge. He was a special student in that he had not decided on a major. For advice he went to General Francis Amasa Walker, then president of M.I.T., who offered that Whitney should avoid electrical engineering, then a relatively new field at M.I.T., and stick to chemistry or biology. Whitney discussed his ideas with his peers, Pierre du Pont and George Hale. He ultimately decided on chemistry.

During his sophomore year at M.I.T. Whitney met Arthur A. Noyes, a laboratory assistant in the chemistry department who inspired Whitney with his work on solutions.

Shortly before his graduation from M.I.T. in 1890, Whitney was appointed as Assistant Instructor of Chemistry for the following academic year. It was during this time that he met Gerard Swope and William (Bill) D. Coolidge. He also taught Alfred P. Sloan, Paul Litchfield, and Irénée du Pont. He taught general chemistry for two years and then made the switch over to analytical chemistry. He lectured without notes and got to know the individual student. Whitney saw students as knowledge-seekers rather than storage containers of answers. Similar to his senior, Arthur A. Noyes, Whitney's approach was more research based. He would give students a problem that was not in their textbook and told them to solve it by researching, devising a method, carrying it out, and by presenting a report. This clashed with the institution's approach. After two more years of teaching analytical chemistry, Whitney decided to go to the University of Leipzig to obtain his doctorate and study under Wilhelm Ostwald.

=== University of Leipzig ===
Studying under Wilhelm Ostwald, who also taught Whitney's predecessor, Arthur A. Noyes, Whitney's thesis project was on color changes during chemical reactions. He also accepted the task of translating Max Le Blanc's Electrochemistry textbook. Le Blanc was a colleague of Ostwald who Whitney met in Leipzig. In 1896, Whitney finished the translation, finished his laboratory work, and successfully defended his thesis. He earned his doctoral degree and went from assistant instructor of chemistry to doctor of philosophy. After attaining his doctoral degree, Whitney did not leave Germany to return home immediately. Instead, he studied organic chemistry with Charles Friedel at the Sorbonne in France for about six months.

== Corrosion Theory ==
After returning from Leipzig with his doctorate, Whitney resumed working with Noyes in the laboratory. Whitney was intrigued by the competing theories of corrosion during his recent consulting assignment at a Boston hospital where rust plagued the water pipes. He designed an experiment to see whether carbonic acid, which was widely accepted to be necessary for rusting to occur, was really necessary. To do this, he examined corrosion through a physical chemistry approach. He reasoned that corrosion must occur in an oxidation-reduction reaction, similar to how Nernst explained the physical chemistry of a battery. His experiment then consisted of eliminating all traces of air, acid, and soluble alkali from sealed water bottles. He placed pieces of iron in the water bottles and sealed them with paraffin. Then he left the bottles on a shelf and checked to see if any rust had formed each day. Seeing as no rust formed for weeks, he decided to open them and let air in. Almost immediately, the water turned yellow and then rust started forming. Whitney reasoned that iron would not have dissolved between the time he opened the bottle and the formation of rust occurred. Thus, he reasoned that the iron dissolved into the water before he opened it, due to the hydrogen ion concentration. To verify his results, he sent his undergraduate students to gather more research. Based on Whitney's theory, hydrogen ions would be present during this process; one Whitney student verified this by opening up a rusty radiator and lighting a match. Hydrogen was present. Basically, Whitney found that the proper electrical contact between the cathode and anodic region as well as the presence of hydrogen ions were enough to make corrosion occur. He also found that keeping iron in an alkali solution could prevent rusting. He published his results in 1903 and earned immediate recognition in the American audience. However, Wilhelm Palmaer, one of Arrhenius's students in Sweden, published a similar article in 1901. While Whitney can not be credited for discovering corrosion theory, he did introduce it to the masses.

== Eastman Kodak ==
George Eastman from Eastman Kodak came to M.I.T. one day, to enlist Arthur Noyes and Whitney's help. In merging with the American Aristotype company, Eastman needed help to lower costs by making the production of photographic paper less wasteful. Specifically, Eastman saw the need to recover the alcohol and ether vapor that was going to waste in the photographic paper production process. After some weeks, Noyes and Whitney had found a solution. Although the exact details of the solvent recovery process remained as secret, the procedure appeared to have involved collecting the evolved vapors and distilling them back into their constituents after passing them through a certain chemical gel. In July 1899, Noyes and Whitney signed a contract that granted the company full use of the process while paying the two chemists a handsome sum of money, funding half of a laboratory, and giving the two chemists stock from said company. At the time, this crossover between academics and businessmen was uncommon.

== General Electric ==
In 1900, Whitney received correspondence from Edwin W. Rice and Elihu Thomson of General Electric. They wanted Whitney to become the director of General Electric's new Electric Research Laboratory. Whitney blatantly turned down the offer multiples times on account of his love for teaching. Finally, Rice proposed that Whitney could come try performing experiments without any commitment and he could travel between M.I.T. until he chose either. Whitney took this offer and met Charles Steinmetz on one of his first days there. Steinmetz had been working in his own private laboratory near the Schenectady lab

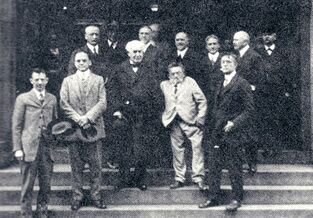
William Coolidge, Willis Rodney Whitney, Thomas Edison, Charles Proteus Steinmitz, Irving Langmuir at the G.E. Laboratory. (front row, left-to-right) 1923.

for a while. Whitney was eager to produce something that would be beneficial to the company in order to prove his endeavor meaningful.

=== Electric Furnace ===
One of the first problems Whitney solved at the General Electric Laboratory was that of making a furnace that produced porcelain rods with scientific precision. He noticed that many rods would go to waste because of various defects. After consulting with a foreman, he found that the current furnaces had varying temperatures; especially after a certain amount of repetitions. As a result, the furnaces could not be expected to produce perfect porcelain rods after every attempt. After experimenting with iron pipes, carbon pipes, and wire, Whitney found that he could create a suitable furnace by passing a controlled amount of current through a wire wrapped around a carbon pipe. The carbon pipe would have a cork or coal powder in it to prevent combustion and water-cooled clamps to regulate the temperature. After finding the perfect ratio of heat to time cooking the porcelain rods, Whitney called in the foreman. Whitney demonstrated that the porcelain came out perfectly nearly every time and G.E. began production of the furnaces immediately.

=== G.E.M. Lamps ===
After finding success with his electric furnace design, Whitney moved on to tackling the problem of improving the incandescent lamp. The trouble was that the current carbon filaments in the incandescent lamps evaporated so quickly at high temperatures that to lengthen the lifespan of the bulbs, it was only viable to keep them on at lower temperatures, thus less light would be emitted. Pressure from competition with other companies like Westinghouse made the laboratory's major goal to improve the incandescent lamp for the time. To tackle this problem Whitney recruited the help of some of his former M.I.T. students and foreign scientists. Eventually in December 1903, Whitney found his solution. He used the electric furnaces from his porcelain experiment to subject the current carbon filaments to carefully controlled yet hotter temperatures. The carbon filaments began to form a graphite layer that had metal-like properties. The resistance of the outer layer of the filament grew with increasing temperature, allowing for the lamp to be run at hotter temperatures for longer. Using his connection with the G.E. Factory in Harrison, Whitney got his filaments into production as soon as possible. The lamps that used these filaments were named "General Electric Metallized" lamps or "G.E.M." lamps for short. It was shortly after this in May 1904, that Whitney decided to leave M.I.T. and accept the full-time position as director of the General Electric Research Laboratory.

Whitney may have gotten his inspiration for his filaments from the time he visited the Paris laboratory of Henry Moissan, an electrochemist who subjected graphite to enough heat and pressure to believe he made diamonds.

=== Tungsten Lamps ===
The new tantalum filaments created by Werner von Bolton once again pressured the lamp industry. Whitney and his team set to work by investigating the elements near tantalum on the periodic table. They

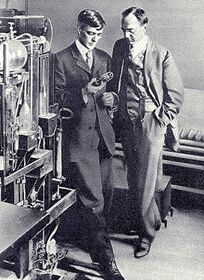
Irving Langmuir (left) and Willis R. Whitney (right) in the G.E. Laboratory. 1920

found that tungsten would be the most suitable for the job; if not for its brittleness. After recognizing that he needed to recruit another talented scientist, he enlisted the help of William D. Coolidge, one of his former chemistry students. He gave Coolidge the same deal that Rice had given him; recognizing that Coolidge, like Whitney himself, did not want to leave his M.I.T. research for an industrial laboratory. Coolidge eventually became invested in his work on the tungsten filament and solved the problem using a cadmium amalgam binder to shape the filament. The binder would distil out as the filament was heated, leaving behind a pure tungsten filament. Whitney was sent to Germany to study incandescent and tungsten lamp work in Germany shortly after this discovery. Upon returning he explained to his employees that the Germans had a similar process that G.E. bought the patent to, but he insisted that Coolidge's process will be better in the long-run if it can be given a little more time to be perfected. Around December 1907, Coolidge reported that the process was perfected and that the filaments could be sent for mass production. Shortly after hearing Coolidge's report, Whitney was hospitalized due to untreated appendicitis. He spent Christmas there, but was comforted by his employees who came to visit him.

These tungsten-filament lamps were sold alongside the G.E.M. lamps for a short period of time, until the company dropped the G.E.M. lamp altogether for the superior tungsten-filament lamp.

=== Blackening Bulbs ===
After Whitney's return to the laboratory after recovering from appendicitis, Whitney met Irving Langmuir, a young chemistry professor who came to the G.E. Laboratory to do research over the summer. Langmuir wondered why the lamp bulbs blackened after use and started working on a solution almost immediately after arriving at the lab. After not having produced tangible results during the summer,

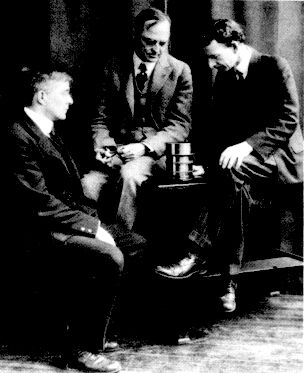
The big three of the G.E. Laboratory. Willis R. Whitney (center) and Irving Langmuir and William Coolidge. 1909

Langmuir was prepared to leave the G.E. Laboratory to avoid wasting funding and time. Whitney insisted that Langmuir stay as long as he was having fun; that he would take care of the administrative details. Three years later, the same scenario occurred. In 1913, Langmuir had a breakthrough. He found that by the blackening of the bulbs was caused by the tungsten filament evaporating on to the glass. Simply put, this could be mitigated by introducing a vapor to the bulb and by altering the shape of the filament; the best vapor based on Langmuir's experiments was argon. Argon slowed the evaporation of the tungsten and yet another revolution was made in the lamp industry. The new lamp, using Coolidge's tungsten process and Langmuir's gas-filling process was marketed as the Mazda C Lamp, referencing the Persian god associated with light.

=== Inductotherm ===
One day, some of the apprentice lab boys walked into Whitney's office and complained about feeling unwell. They had been working near high-frequency equipment all day. Whitney took this with skepticism, but allowed the boys to go home early for the day. The next day he had Dr. Glen Smith from the nearby hospital conspicuously sit-in with the boys to solve what was going on. Dr. Smith also developed a fever. Whitney ran experiments on cockroaches and mice, artificially increasing their internal temperatures with a high-frequency apparatus to get some more information. He eventually worked his way up to experimenting on a diseased dog and the dog was cured with one hour of treatment a day. Whitney recalled Dr. Julius Wagner-Jauregg's trials with purposely giving patients with brain disorders malarial injections to induce a fever in the hopes of curing them. Before progressing any further with this apparatus, he experimented on his self and found that it relieved his stiff shoulder pain. He progressed with his trials to Ellis Hospital. Then, he moved on to conducting trials at a clinic at Columbia Presbyterian Medical Center. He later worked with doctors from the Albany Medical College to perfect this device. The device operated by using a vacuum tube to create electromagnetic waves as long as a meter or as short as one ten-thousandth of a meter at maximum. Whitney formally wrote a paper regarding the theory of how this device treated bursitis by raising levels of lactic acid near muscles and transporting calcium bone deposits. After the paper was published in the G.E. Review, the G.E. X- Ray corporation branded this device as the "Inductotherm" and sold it to the masses. The "Inductotherm" is actually a diathermy device. It was for this that Whitney was later awarded with the French Legion of Honor.

=== Other Endeavors ===
Coolidge also had a breakthrough in 1913 with his hot cathode X-ray tube. Ezekiel Weintraub worked on various projects alongside Coolidge, Whitney, and Langmuir but was especially drawn to wireless telegraphy. Other projects included developing better electrodes, lightning arresters, insulating materials, carbon motors, generator brushes, soapstone plates, electric blanket, etc. While Whitney did not

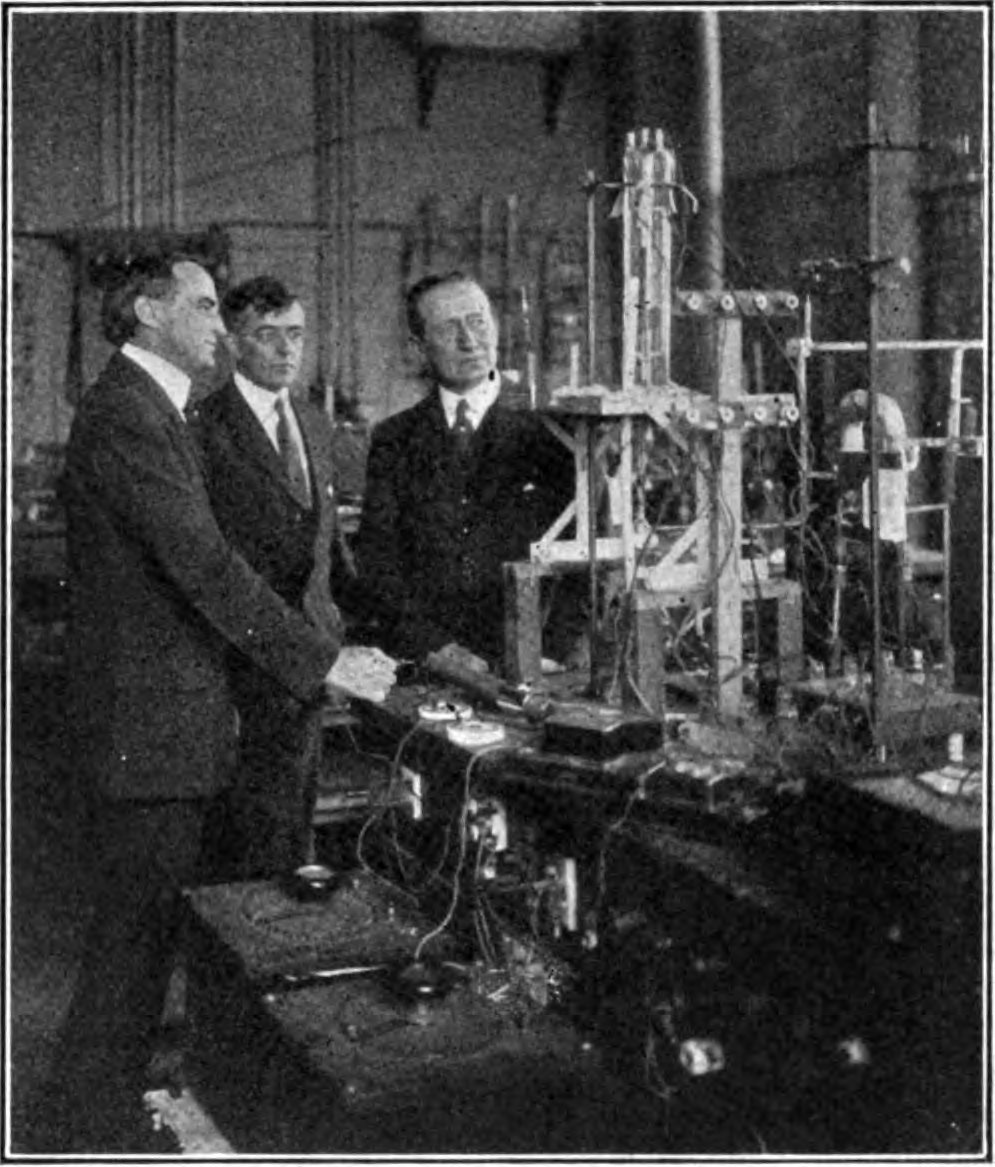
Whitney (left) and Langmuir (center) showing Guglielmo Marconi (left) a vacuum tube that G.E. produced for radio transmitters. This is one of the many other experiments that Whitney was not majorly involved in, but still oversaw the progress of.

work on each project directly, he would often come up with ideas and offer them to his employees for them to work on.

=== Research Directing Methods ===
As the director of the General Electric Research Laboratory, Whitney had to take care of administrative details, hire employees, fire employees, read the latest scientific journals, write articles on new inventions, attend conferences, speak at conferences, etc. Whitney believed in encouraging collaboration in the laboratory and held mandatory weekly meetings that he called colloquia. In these meetings, his researchers were required to update each other on any progress or discoveries, disclose any issues, offer advice, or simply discuss something they learned somewhere. Whitney made it a point to check in with every one in the research lab every day to offer advice, encouragement, generally inquire, critique, or just say hello. He believed that this would encourage teamwork and boost morale. Whitney chose his research team applicants based on those who already had one to two years of experience performing their own experiments as well as based on the individual's desire to experiment and strong ideas. Considered the founding father of industrial research, Whitney came up with three main ideas for smooth direction.

1. All inventions would remain the researcher's work but would go to the company.
2. Each individual is allowed to have a personality. As a research director, Whitney wanted his employees to play to their strengths.
3. A research director should remain optimistic. Whitney was an astute believer in profiting from seemingly aimless research.

As time got harder, the General Electric Laboratory focused more on short-term goals in order to maintain profit. However, they still had one or two major projects continuing at all times. When the stock market crashed in 1929, Whitney had to fire many of his employees. This plunged him into a depression that he took a six month vacation to remedy. Coolidge remained acting director ever since and eventually, in 1932, Whitney announced his plan to retire and effectively make Coolidge the next director. During Whitney's time, the G.E. Laboratory effectively combined the worlds of industry and research and became known as the "House of Magic."

== Patents ==
While working at G.E., Whitney filed many patents. He also encouraged his employees to write down anything in their laboratory notebooks as they could use this as evidence in patent suits in the future. In addition, based on company policy, patent idea letters had to addressed to Whitney, who would then decide whether the idea could be profitable. Then, Whitney would relay the idea to the company's patent department. Among the patents that Whitney filed as an inventor are...

- A vapor electric device and operation method: US 2307052, Gordon & Whitney, "Vapor Electric Device and Method of Operation", issued 1943-01-05
- An improvement on the previously mentioned device: US 2347048, Gordon & Whitney, "Vapor Electric Device and Method of Operation", issued 1944-04-18
- A refrigerant control device: US 2548643, Whitney, "Refrigerant Flow Controlling Device", issued 1951-04-10
- A moisture indicator: US 2021760, Whitney, "Moisture Indicator", issued 1935-11-19
- A water-purification apparatus: US 2340721, Whitney, "Apparatus and Method for Purifying Water", issued 1944-02-01
- A soot disposal apparatus and its operation method: US 1828631, Whitney, "Soot Disposal Process and Apparatus", issued 1931-10-20
- A photoelectric system: US 1794222, Whitney, "Photoelectric System", issued 1931-02-24
- A method of making crucibles: US 1784647, Whitney, "Method of Making Crucibles", issued 1930-12-09
- A composite metal gear: US 1685657, Whitney, "Composite Metal Article", issued 1928-09-25
- A process of producing a matte finish: US, Whitney, "Process of Producing Matte Finish", issued 1925-12-15

These are just a few of the many patents Whitney filed. Whitney's connections with G.E.'s patent department helped expedite the patent application process for any new inventions or discoveries the research laboratory may have found.

== Naval Consulting Board ==
When Josephus Daniels organized a Naval Consulting Board during World War I, Whitney was recruited to be on it. Led by Thomas A. Edison, the purpose of the board was to field ideas and see which ones were viable. Whitney was appointed chairman of the chemistry and physics divisions and was soon put in charge of research of all nitrate production at Muscle Shoals on the Tennessee River. Using his connections at G.E. and Du Pont, he got an experimental submarine detection station built in Nahant, Massachusetts. While Whitney was in charge of the research, Irving Langmuir, who was also recruited, led the Nahant station, and Coolidge experimented with rubber tubing there. During this time, Whitney recruited Albert Hull from Worcester Polytechnic Institute to work with him at G.E. and on this project at Nahant. Eventually Coolidge developed his C-tube, a rubber tube with a piece of metal attached, that could detect submarines up to two miles away. Dr. Hull and colleagues eventually improved on this design to make the K-tube that could detect submarines up to ten miles away.

== Philosophy ==
Whitney was a proponent of researching and experimenting for pleasure. He disliked administrative details; before being pressured by the company, his weekly "colloquia" were informal and casual. He would often ask his employees whether they were having fun as he firmly believed in "serendipity." After reading Horace Walpole's version of The Three Princes of Serendip, he often tried to teach his employees to follow such a practice. Guys Suits recalls Whitney saying, "Necessity is not the mother of invention. Knowledge and experiment are its parents." Here are some other of his notable sayings:

"Never label an experiment useless; it may reveal something unthought of but worth knowing."

— Willis R. Whitney, in Virginia Veeder Westervelt, The World was his Laboratory; The Story of Dr. Willis R. Whitney

“Discoveries and inventions are not terminals; they are fresh starting points from which we can climb to new knowledge."

— Willis R. Whitney, in Virginia Veeder Westervelt, The World was his Laboratory; The Story of Dr. Willis R. Whitney

Whitney wrote several articles, gave speeches at science conferences, and argued in favor of increasing interest in research. This was one of his critiques upon returning from Leipzig. Whitney believed that chemists should do research; estimating that only a small percentage of those with degrees in chemical sciences in the United States actually did any chemical research. Upon meeting with Marie Curie at the Carnegie mansion, Whitney put his efforts behind setting up funding for interested future scientists. He helped establish the Gerard Swope Loan Fund for G.E. employees and the Steinmetz Memorial Scholarship. In addition, the G.E. laboratory implemented a "test" program where college students would work there as "test" assistants and attend college at night.

== Various Experiments and Hobbies ==
In addition to Whitney's career-related experiments, he also conducted many of his own experiments for pleasure. Here are some notable ones:

=== Turtle Tracking ===
Beginning around 1912, Whitney focused more of his energy towards one of his favorite hobbies: turtle tracking. He would log his encounters, locations, dates, and even mark the turtles' shells to track them. Once he witnessed a turtle laying its eggs and marked the spot. A skunk came along and ate some eggs, so Whitney scared it off before it could eat all of them. Then, when hatching season came, he and his wife came down and watched the turtles hatch. Eventually Whitney began to keep some in captivity, but he noticed that turtles will not lay eggs in captivity. While conducting his various turtle observations in Niskayuna Woods, Whitney found that turtles liked to eat bananas, they migrated annually to same spot each year, and that their age could be told by rings on their shells. He also found that turtles would bury themselves in mud in the fall, get snowed on in the winter, and emerge alive in the spring. During the Great Depression in the 1930s, Whitney would give children who brought him a turtle a quarter.

=== Vacuum Fly Experiment ===
At one point, Whitney received a letter asking whether insects could survive in a vacuum. Whitney gave this experiment to an employee to perform, but the employee replied that it was pointless. Another employee was offered the experiment to the same result. Whitney eventually performed the experiment himself. He sealed a cockroach and a fly in a vacuum chamber and observed. The insects stopped moving. After some time, Whitney gradually released the vacuum and both insects started moving again.

=== Freezing of Water ===
Whitney was fairly active in keeping up with scientific journals. Once, he entered the discourse regarding the freezing of hot and cold water after reading an article in the journal Science, titled "Roger Bacon Was Mistaken." Whitney performed the experiment himself after some reasoning based on colligative properties. He decided that because heating water usually dispels any soluble components, the hot water's freezing point should be raised compared to the colder water's. Thus, the hot water should freeze faster. Performing the experiment himself, he found that the hot water tray that he left in his freezer froze significantly more than the cold water tray, measured by volume. He published his own article in the same journal in June 1946.

=== Whitney's Crib ===
One day, the Whitney's and a childhood friend's family went out on Lake Chautauqua over the summer. Whitney noticed that if the camp they were staying at had a seawall, the dock and land would be protected from any waves. He took it upon himself to oversee and facilitate the construction of such a seawall. Some time after, he found a shallow area in the middle of Lake Chautauqua. He got out of his friend's boat and inspected it for a couple hours. He dropped stones here and there and the idea to make an actual island popped into his head. He hired a team and set to work filling the two-hundred and fifty-six foot space with rocks. The following summer the island was completed. Whitney erected a flag there and left Whitney's Island. He went down to a courthouse and received a deed to the property on November 6, 1899. It was made out to Willis R. Whitney and Fred E. Armitage. The island has been lost to time and is now known as Whitney's Crib to visitors of Lake Chautauqua.

== Memberships and Positions ==
Whitney held the following positions and was a member of:

- Translator of M. Le Blanc's Electro-Chemistry (1896)
- Member and President of the American Chemical Society (1909)
- Member and President of The American Electrochemical Society (1911–1912)
- The U.S. Naval Consulting Board (1915)
- The National Academy of Sciences (Elected 1917)
- The Advisory Committee to the National Bureau of Standards (1925-1930)
- Honorary Vice President of G.E. (1932)
- Director of G.E. Research Laboratory (1900-1928)
- Vice President of G.E. in charge of research (1928- 1941)
- The American Institute of Electrical Engineers
- The American Institute of Mining and Metallurgical Engineers
- The American Institute of Electrical Engineers
- The American Society for the Advancement of Science
- The American Academy of Arts and Sciences
- The American Physical Society
- The American Philosophical Society
- Honorary Member of the American Steel Treaters' Society
- The French Legion of Honor
- The Franklin Institute
- The British Institute of Metals
- The National Research Council
- Trustee of the Albany Medical College
- Trustee of the Dudley Observatory in Albany
- The Board of Governors of Union College
- Emeritus Member of the Corporation of the Massachusetts Institute of Technology
- Emeritus Professor of Chemical Research at M.I.T.
- Associate Editor of the Journal of Industrial and Engineering Chemistry

== Awards and Titles ==
Whitney attained the following awards and titles:

- Willard Gibbs Medal Recipient (1916)
- Honorary Doctor of Science from Union College (1919)
- Honorary Doctor of Chemistry from the University of Pittsburgh (1919)
- Chandler Medal (1920)
- Perkin Medal Recipient (1921)
- Honorary Doctor of Science from Syracuse University (1926)
- Honorary Doctor from the University of Rochester
- Honorary Degree from the University of Michigan (1927)
- Public Welfare Gold Medal of the National Institute of Social Sciences (1928)
- Honorary Doctor of Laws from Lehigh University (1929)
- Franklin Medal of the Franklin Institute (1931)
- Edison Medal "for his contributions to electrical science, his pioneer inventions, and his inspiring leadership in research" (1935)
- Decoration of Chevalier of the French Legion of Honor (1937)
- Public Welfare Medal from the National Academy of Sciences, (1938)
- John Fritz Medal Recipient (1943)
- First recipient of the IRI Medal from the Industrial Research Institute (1946)
- Distinguished Service Gold Key from the American Congress of Physical Therapy
- Walk of Fame Stone at Rollins College
- First recipient of the Willis Rodney Whitney Award from the National Society of Corrosion Engineers
