= William A. Edelstein =

American physicist

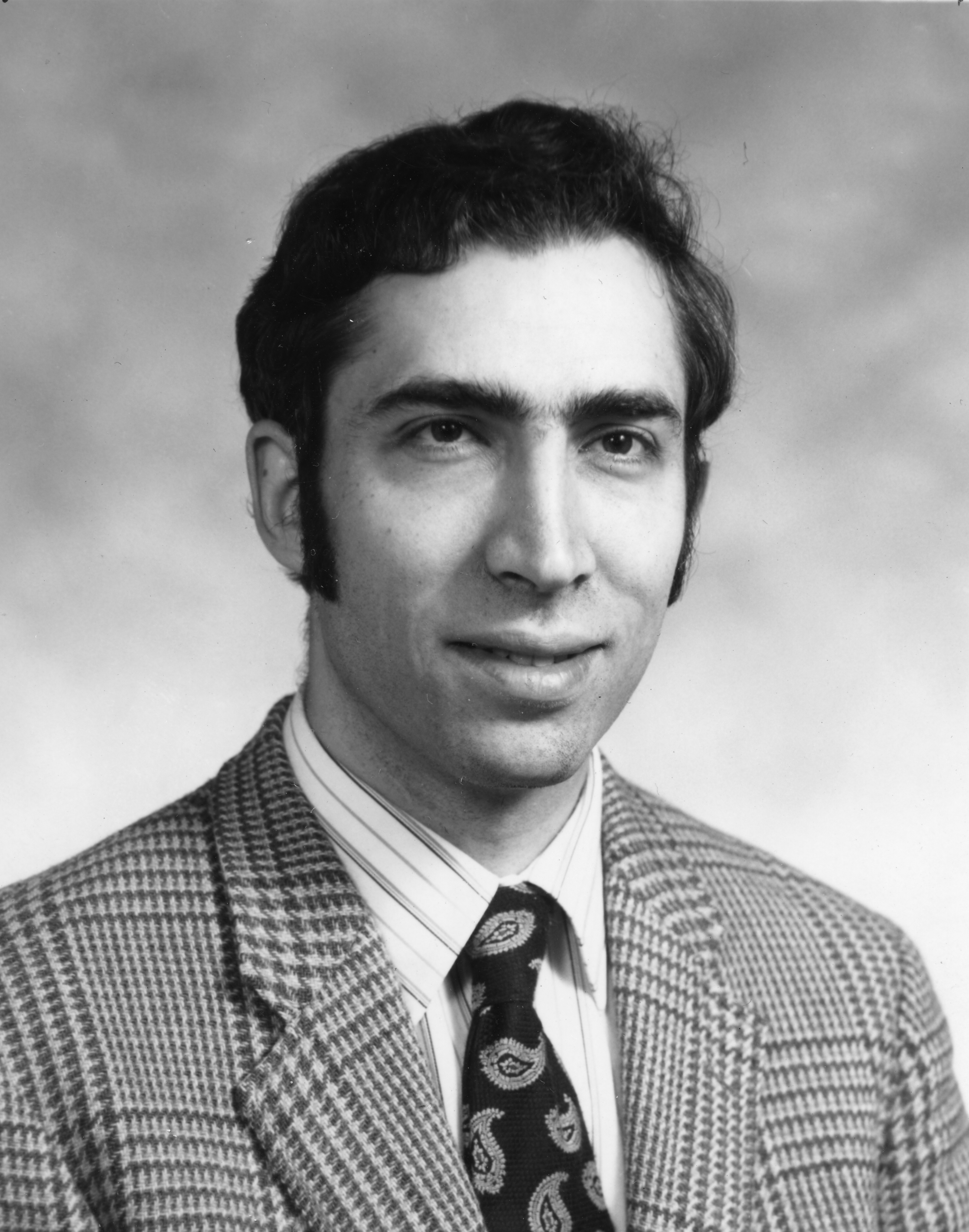
- Born: November 21, 1944; Gloversville, New York, US
- Died: February 10, 2014 (aged 69); Northwood, Baltimore, Maryland, US
- Education: University of Illinois Urbana-Champaign, Harvard University
- Known for: Nuclear Magnetic Resonance Imaging
- Spouse: Fiona Jones (m. 1977)
- Children: 3
- Scientific career
- Fields: Physics
- Institutions: General Electric, Johns Hopkins University
- Doctoral advisor: Robert Pound

William A. Edelstein FInstP (November 21, 1944 – February 10, 2014) was an American physicist. One of the key developers of magnetic resonance imaging (MRI), he was part of the team that developed the first full-body MRI scanner at the University of Aberdeen, Scotland, and was the primary inventor of spin-warp imaging, which is still used in all commercial MRI systems.

Edelstein's contributions to MRI technology include pulse sequence optimization, radio-frequency-coil and gradient-coil design, circuitry improvements, high field imaging, acoustic noise reduction, and the NMR Phased Array.

== Early life and education ==
Edelstein was born in Gloversville, New York, to Arthur S. Edelstein, an optometrist, and Hannah Edelstein. His father was stationed in Myanmar with the United States Air Force and did not meet his son until he was a year old. His family was Jewish.

He grew up in Schenectady, New York and Utica, New York before moving to Northbrook, Illinois, where he graduated from Glenbrook North High School in 1962. He received a Bachelor of Science in physics from the University of Illinois Urbana-Champaign in 1965, graduating summa cum laude. He then attended Harvard University, earning a master's degree in physics in 1967, followed by his Ph.D. in 1974. His thesis, on nuclear physics, was supervised by Robert Pound.

Academic awards include the Edmund James Scholar and the 1965 Brahana Prize in Mathematics at the University of Illinois, where he was a member of Phi Beta Kappa.

== Career ==
Edelstein moved to Scotland, where he had two three-year postdoctoral research fellowships: the first at the University of Glasgow, where he worked on gravitational wave detection from 1974 to 1977, and the second at the University of Aberdeen from 1977 to 1980, where he was part of the group that performed the first full-body human MRI scan.

Edelstein worked for the General Electric Research and Development Centre in Schenectady from 1980 to 2001, where he continued to work in a group which included colleague Paul Bottomley on the development of GE's MRI technology. He was named a Coolidge Fellow, the highest corporate scientific honor bestowed by GE R&D, and won the GE Dushman Award for “Outstanding Technical Work on Nuclear Magnetic Resonance, Imaging and Spectroscopy."

After 21 years at GE, he founded MRScience LLC, through which he continued to work on the technology. He also served as a visiting scientist at Rensselaer Polytechnic Institute in New York and a senior research associate at Case Western Reserve University in Ohio. Edelstein became a Visiting Distinguished Professor of Radiology at Johns Hopkins University in 2007.

During his career, he held 49 patents.

== Recognition ==
He was named a fellow of the American Physical Society in 1988, Institute of Physics in 1996 and International Society of Magnetic Resonance in Medicine (ISMRM) in 1997.

He won the Gold Medal from the ISMRM in 1990, and the AIP Prize for Industrial Applications of Physics from the American Institute of Physics in 2005. He received an honorary doctorate from the University of Aberdeen in 2007 and the 2013 Alumni Achievement Award from the University of Illinois.

== Star Trek controversy ==
In 2010, Edelstein presented a paper at a meeting of the American Physical Society in which he disclosed his findings that the reason that space travel at the speed of light had not been achieved is that according to Einstein's Special Theory of Relativity, spaceships would be exposed at such speeds to a dose of radiation that would be fatal to crew members. Edelstein suggested that his calculations showed the crew of the Starship Enterprise would have suffered this fate if their travels had not been fiction. Star Trek fans protested volubly on numerous internet discussion boards.

== Personal life ==
Edelstein met his wife, psychologist Fiona (née Jones), while living in Glasgow. They married in 1977 and had a son, physicist Arthur Edelstein, and two daughters, writer Jean Hannah Edelstein and linguist Elspeth (Edelstein) Barras.

Edelstein died of lung cancer on February 10, 2014, at his home in Northwood, Baltimore.
