= William D. Coolidge =

American physicist and engineer (1873–1975)

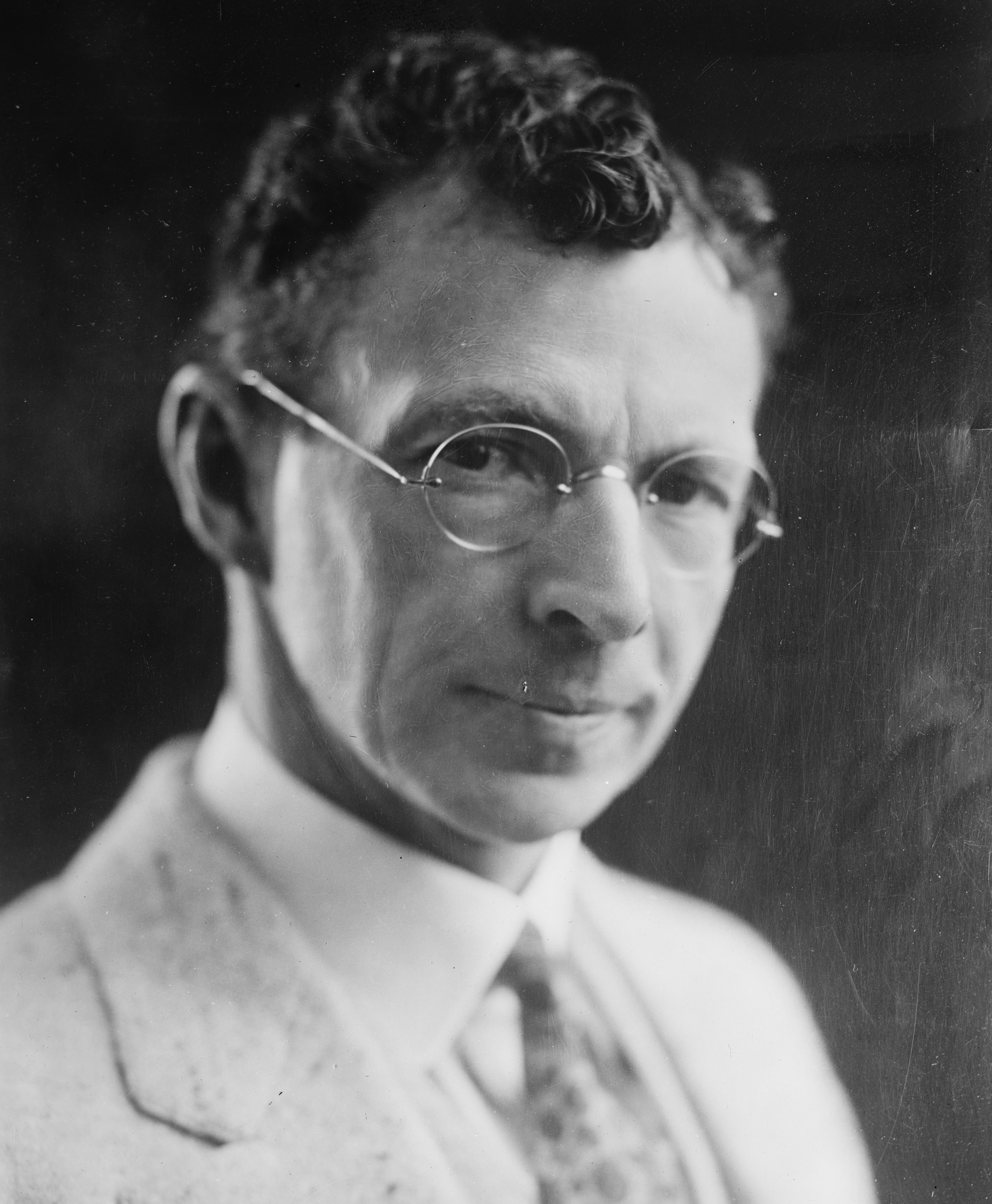
- Born: October 23, 1873; Hudson, Massachusetts, U.S.
- Died: February 3, 1975 (aged 101); Schenectady, New York, U.S.
- Education: University of Leipzig; Massachusetts Institute of Technology
- Known for: his contributions to the incandescent electric lighting and the X-rays art
- Awards: IEEE Edison Medal (1927); Hughes Medal (1927); Faraday Medal (1939); Duddell Medal and Prize (1941)
- Scientific career
- Fields: Electrical engineering

William David Coolidge (/ˈkuːlɪdʒ/; October 23, 1873 – February 3, 1975) was an American physicist and engineer, who made major contributions to X-ray machines. He was the director of the General Electric Research Laboratory and a vice-president of the corporation. He was also famous for the development of "ductile tungsten", which is important for the incandescent light bulb.

== Early years ==
Coolidge was born on 23 October 1873 on a farm near Hudson, Middlesex County, Massachusetts, the only child of Albert Edward Coolidge (14 September 1849 – 12 November 1943) and his wife Martha Alice Shattuck (b. 19 November 1849). He studied electrical engineering from 1891 until 1896 at the Massachusetts Institute of Technology (MIT). After a year as a laboratory assistant, he went to Germany for further study and received his doctorate from the University of Leipzig. From 1899 to 1905 he was a research assistant to Arthur A. Noyes of the Chemistry Department at MIT.

== Ductile tungsten ==
Coolidge went to work as a researcher at General Electric's new research laboratory in 1905, where he conducted experiments that led to the use of tungsten as filaments in light bulbs. He developed 'ductile tungsten', which could be more easily drawn into filaments, by purifying tungsten oxide. Starting in 1911, General Electric marketed lamps using the new metal and they soon became an important source of income for GE. He applied for and received a patent (US#1,082,933) for this 'invention' in 1913. However, in 1928 a US court ruled that his 1913 patent was not valid as an invention.

== Improved X-ray tube ==
William Coolidge explains medical imaging and X-rays.

In 1913 he invented the Coolidge tube (hot cathode tube), an X-ray tube with an improved cathode for use in X-ray machines that allowed for more intense visualization of deep-seated anatomy and tumors. The Coolidge tube, which also utilized a tungsten filament, was a major development in the then-nascent medical specialty of radiology (US patent filed in 1913 and granted as US Patent 1,203,495 in 1916). Its basic design is still in use. He also invented the first rotating anode X-ray tube.

== Awards ==
The American Academy of Arts and Sciences, of which he was a member, awarded Coolidge the Rumford Prize in 1914. He was elected to the United States National Academy of Sciences in 1925. Coolidge was awarded the American Institute of Electrical Engineers Edison Medal in 1927 For his contributions to the incandescent electric lighting and the X-rays art. He rejected this prestigious award in 1926 on the basis that his ductile tungsten patent (1913) was ruled by court as invalid. He was awarded the Howard N. Potts Medal in 1926 and the Louis E. Levy Medal in 1927. He was elected to the American Philosophical Society in 1938. Coolidge was awarded the Faraday Medal in 1939. He was awarded the Franklin Medal in 1944. The city of Remscheid awarded him with the Röntgen Medal for his invention of the hot cathode X-ray tube in 1963. In 1975 he was elected to the National Inventors Hall of Fame, shortly before his death at age 101 in Schenectady, New York.

== Later career ==
Coolidge became director of the GE research laboratory in 1932, and a vice-president of General Electric in 1940, until his retirement in 1944. He continued to consult for GE after retirement.

== Patents ==
- Coolidge, U.S. patent 1,082,933, "Tungsten and method of making the same for use as filaments of incandescent electric lamps and for other purposes."
- Coolidge, U.S. patent 1,203,495, Coolidge tube
- Coolidge, U.S. patent 1,211,092, "X-ray tube"
- Coolidge, U.S. patent 1,215,116, "X-ray apparatus"
- Coolidge, U.S. patent 1,250,093, "Stereoscopic x-ray apparatus"
- Coolidge, U.S. patent 1,310,061, "X-ray apparatus"
- Coolidge, U.S. patent 1,365,638, "X-ray apparatus"
- Coolidge, U.S. patent 1,394,143, "X-ray apparatus"
- Coolidge, U.S. patent 1,409,989, "X-ray apparatus"
- Coolidge, U.S. patent 1,430,550, "X-ray apparatus"
- Coolidge, U.S. patent 1,437,290, "X-ray tube shield'
- Coolidge, U.S. patent 1,502,907, "X-ray device"
- Coolidge, U.S. patent 1,529,344, "X-ray apparatus"
- Coolidge, U.S. patent 1,541,627, "X-ray apparatus"
- Coolidge, U.S. patent 1,543,654, "X-ray apparatus"
- Coolidge, U.S. patent 1,550,506, "X-ray apparatus and method"
- Coolidge, U.S. patent 1,550,507, "X-ray apparatus"
- Coolidge, U.S. patent 1,600,867, "X-ray apparatus"
- Coolidge, U.S. patent 1,655,455, "X-ray apparatus"
- Coolidge, U.S. patent 1,659,133, "X-ray device"
- Coolidge, U.S. patent 1,714,975, "X-ray anode"
- Coolidge, U.S. patent 1,917,099, "X-ray tube"
- Coolidge, U.S. patent 1,946,312, "X-ray tube"
- Coolidge, U.S. patent 1,967,869, "X-ray device"
- Coolidge, U.S. patent 1,971,812, "X-ray device"
