= Independence =

Condition of a nation with self-governance

The Thirteen British Colonies on the east coast of North America issued a Declaration of Independence in 1776

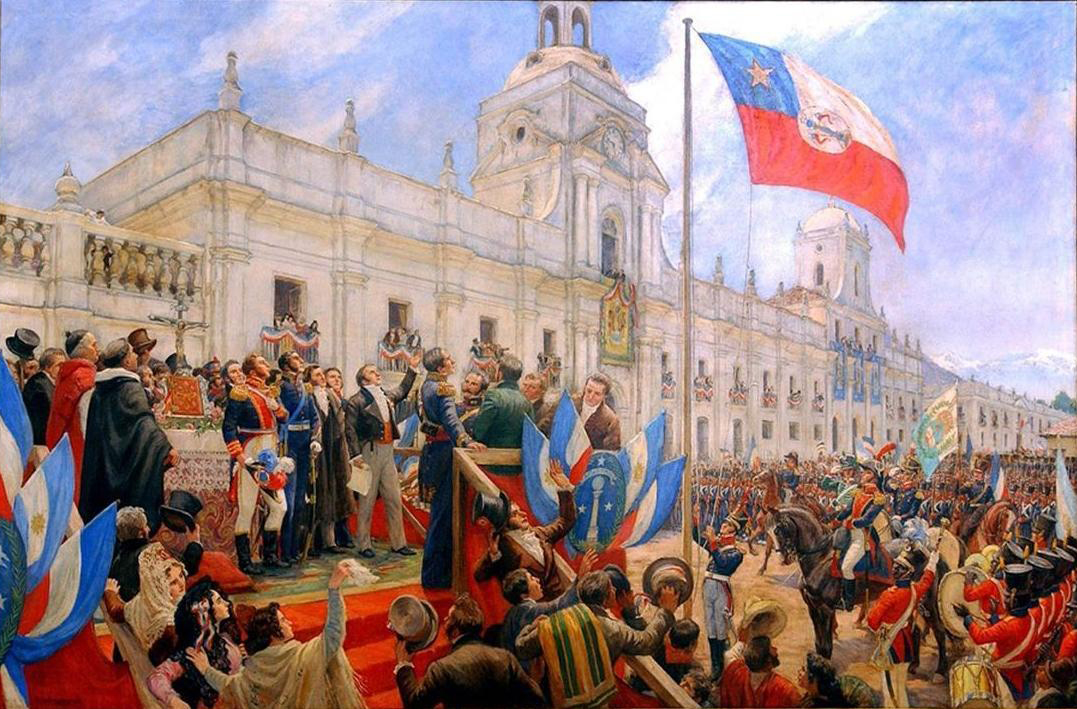
Chile, one of several Spanish territories in South America, issued a Declaration of independence in 1818

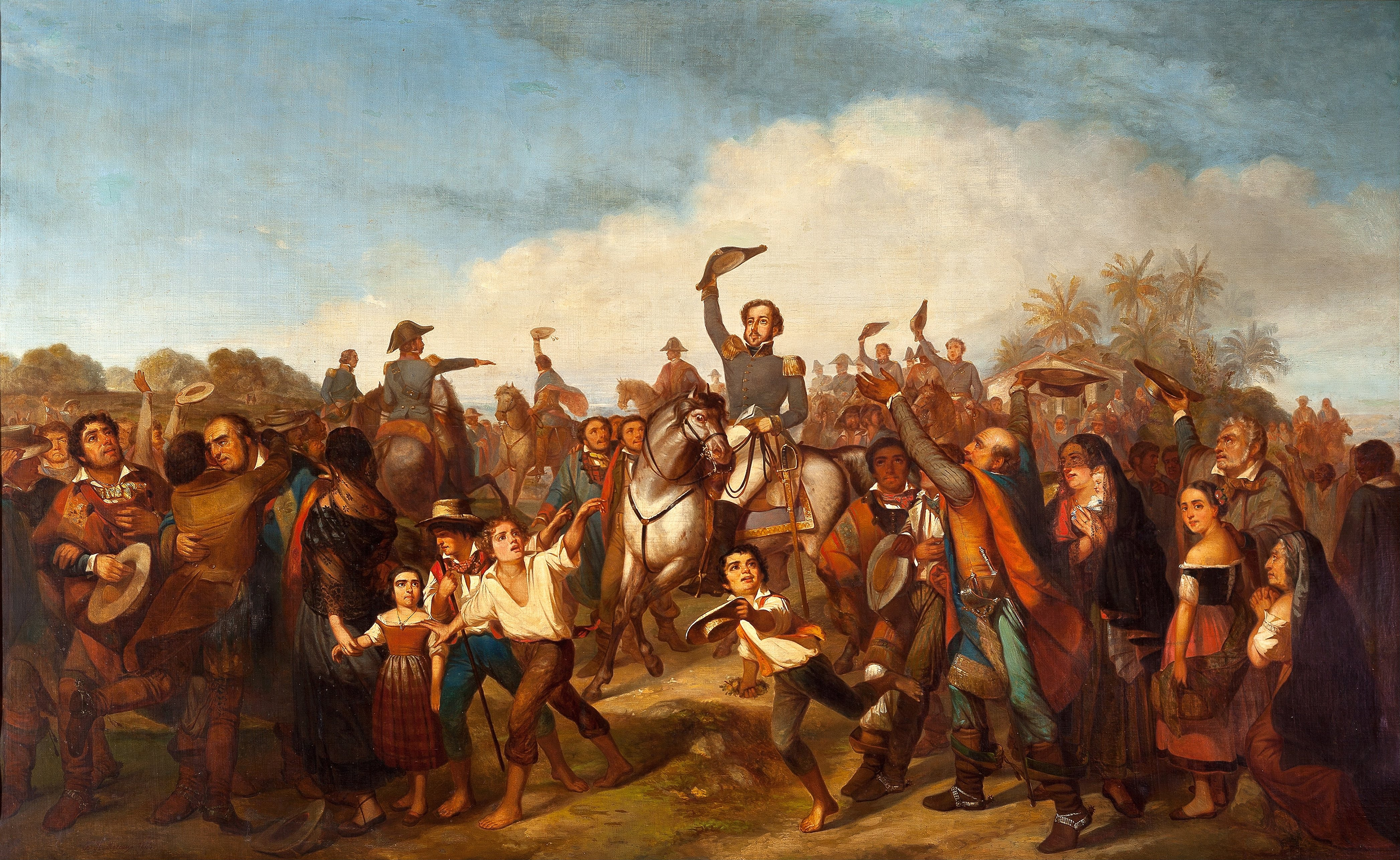
Prince Pedro surrounded by a crowd in São Paulo after breaking the news of Brazil's independence on 7 September 1822.

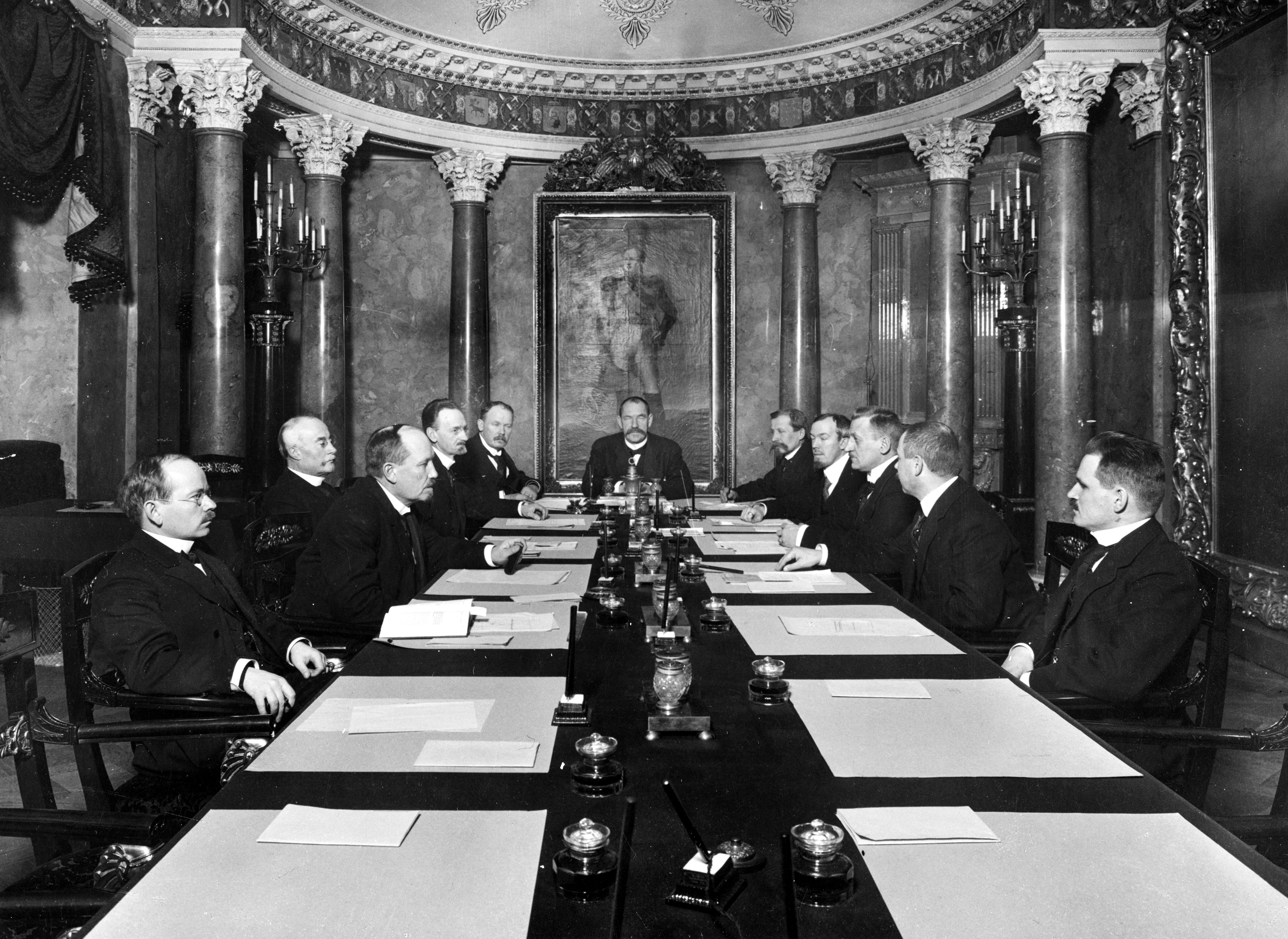
The Finnish Senate of 1917, Prime Minister P. E. Svinhufvud in the head of table. The Senate declared Finland independent on 4 December 1917, and it was confirmed by parliament 6 December 1917 which became the Independence Day of Finland.

Independence is a condition of a nation, country, or state, in which residents and population, or some portion thereof, exercise self-government, and usually sovereignty, over its territory. The opposite of independence is the status of a dependent territory or colony. The commemoration of the independence day of a country or nation celebrates when a country is free from all forms of colonialism; free to build a country or nation without any interference from other nations.

== Definition ==
Whether the attainment of independence is different from revolution has long been contested, and has often been debated over the question of violence as legitimate means to achieving sovereignty. In general, revolutions aim only to redistribute power with or without an element of emancipation, such as in democratization within a state, which as such may remain unaltered. For example, the Mexican Revolution (1910) chiefly refers to a multi-factional conflict that eventually led to a new constitution; it has rarely been used to refer to the armed struggle (1821) against Spain. However, some wars of independence have been described as revolutions, such as the ones in the United States (1783) and Indonesia (1949), while some revolutions that were specifically about a change in the political structure have resulted in breakaway states. Mongolia and Finland, for example, gained their independence during the revolutions occurring in China (1911) and Russia (1917) respectively. Causes for a country or province wishing to seek independence are many, but most can be summed up as a feeling of inequality compared to the dominant power. The means can extend from intended peaceful demonstrations as in the case of India (1947), to a violent war as in the case of Algeria (1962). In some cases, a country may also have declared independence, but may only be partially recognized by other countries; such as Kosovo (2008), whose independence Serbia, from which Kosovo has seceded, has not formally recognized.

=== Distinction between independence and autonomy ===
Autonomy refers to a kind of independence which has been granted by an overseeing authority that itself still retains ultimate authority over that territory (see Devolution). A protectorate refers to an autonomous region that depends upon a larger government for its protection as an autonomous region.

== Right to independence ==
During the 20th century wave of decolonization colonies gained rights to independence through documents such as the 1960 Declaration on the Granting of Independence to Colonial Countries and Peoples, but this right remained mostly applicable only to unfree territorial entities, such as colonies. How much these rights apply to all people has been a crucial point of discussion. The rights to nationality and self-determination allow clarification. The right of self-determination allows self-governance, as for example in the case of indigenous peoples, but is not a right of secession, except in extreme cases of oppression as a remedy from the oppression. Therefore, the right to secession is generally determined by the legislation of sovereign states and independence by the capacity to be a state.

== Declarations of independence ==
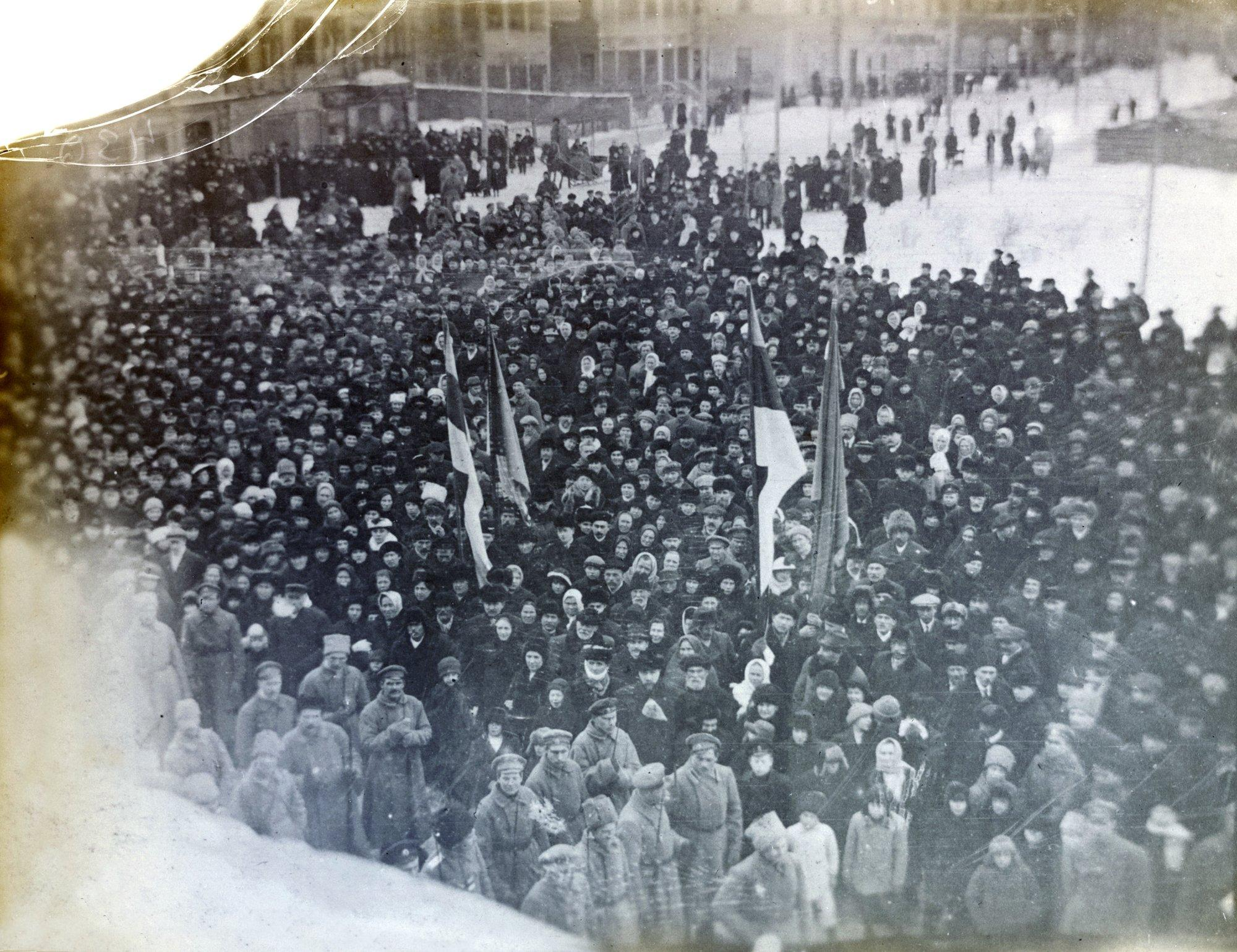
Public proclamation of the Estonian Declaration of Independence in Pärnu, Estonia on 23 February 1918

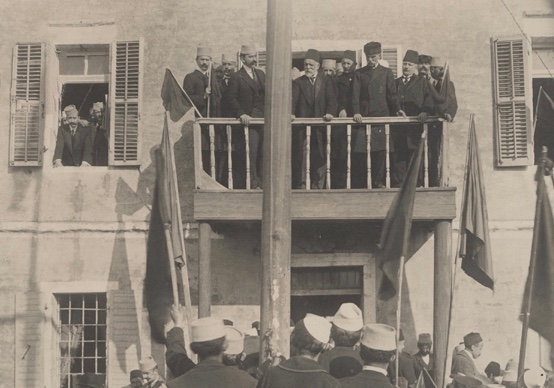
Ismail Kemal at the first anniversary of the Assembly of Vlorë which proclaimed the independence of Albania (28 November 1912)

Sometimes, a state wishing to achieve independence from a dominating power will issue a declaration of independence; the earliest surviving example is Scotland's Declaration of Arbroath in 1320, with the most recent examples being Azawad's declaration of independence in 2012 and Catalan declaration of independence in 2017. Declaring independence and attaining it, however, are quite different. A well-known successful example is the U.S. Declaration of Independence issued in 1776. The dates of established independence (or, less commonly, the commencement of revolution), are typically celebrated as a national holiday known as an independence Day.

== Historical overview ==
Historically, there have been four major periods of declaring independence:

- from the 1770s, beginning with the American Revolutionary War through the 1830s, when the last royalist bastions fell at the close of the Spanish American wars of independence;
- the immediate aftermath of the First World War following the breakup of the Ottoman, Austro-Hungarian, Russian, German empires;
- 1945 to c. 1979, when seventy newly independent states emerged from the European colonial empires like India, Algeria etc. and the collapse of the Nazi German Reich and the Empire of Japan;
- and the early 1990s, following the breakup of the Soviet Union, Czechoslovakia and Yugoslavia.

== Continents ==
Continent	No.	Most Recent Country to Gain Independence
Africa	54	South Sudan (2011)
Americas	35	Saint Kitts and Nevis (1983)
Asia	44	East Timor (2002)
Europe	50	Montenegro (2006); Kosovo (2008)
Oceania	14	Palau (1994)
Antarctica	N/A	de facto condominium international

== See also ==
- Liberty
- Autarky
- Autonomy
- Domestic sourcing
- Economic nationalism
- Energy independence
- Independence constitution
- Independence referendum
- List of national independence days
- List of sovereign states by date of formation
- Lists of active separatist movements
- Real freedom
- Secession
- Self Determination
- Self-sufficiency
- Special Committee on Decolonization
- Unilateral declaration of independence
- United Nations list of non-self-governing territories
- War of Independence

== Notes ==
1. Part of Transcaucasian Region, at the crossroads of Europe and Asia. Physiographically, Armenia falls entirely in Western Asia, while Georgia and Azerbaijan are mostly in Asia with small portions north of the Caucasus Mountains divide in Europe.
2. With partial diplomatic recognition.
3. An independent state in free association with the United States.
