= Patricia Wakeling =

Patricia R. Wakeling
- free use image only
- Born: 1923
- Died: 21 September 2016

Patricia R. Wakeling (1923–2016) was the recipient of the Optical Society of America (OSA) Stephen D. Fantone Distinguished Service Award in 1990 and Managing Editor of the scientific journal Applied Optics for three decades. Wakefield was integral in the launch of OSA's first two journals.

== Early life and career ==
Patricia "Paddy" Wakeling was born and raised in London. She received an undergraduate degree in chemistry and worked at the Office of Naval Research shortly after. Wakeling then spent several years at Pergamon Press where she learnt how to launch scientific journals.

In 1959 Wakeling joined the Optical Society of America to serve as the Assistant Secretary. Wakeling was recommended to Walter Baird, the then chairman of OSA, who knew of her work in the New York office of Pergamon Press, and had heard that she was not completely happy with the company. In the Reminiscences of Bruce Billings, OSA's president in 1971, Billings comments on his introduction to Wakeling in 1949, mediated by the director of the London Office of Naval Research as Wakeling was helping to produce their newsletter. Billings would then visit Wakeling regularly upon his trips to London where he learnt about Wakeling's work at Pergamon. Soon after, Wakeling, still in London, received a call from OSA executive secretary Mary Warga to discuss her subsequent appointment at OSA; at that time, international calls were rare.

Upon joining OSA Wakeling would work on the first floor of the newly completed building belonging to the American Chemical Society. She aided the development of the translation journal Optics and Spectroscopy through her grant from the National Science Foundation. This journal was based on maintaining a translation of the Russian journal Optika i Spektroskopiya and required Wakeling to write to the Soviet Academy of Sciences for their permission and cooperation. At the time, it was a direct reaction to fears that Russian science had progressed further than American technology, yet these achievements were only reported in Soviet science journals, which few American scientists could read. Wakeling kept a blackboard listing each article and which translators were responsible for translating, and whether they were late to deliver; the process, described as "whips cracked, and translators cowered", enabled Optics and Spectroscopy to deliver their issues only three to six months later than the Soviet original.

Wakeling would subsequently receive another fund from the National Science Foundation to start up OSA's second journal Applied Optics in collaboration with editor John N. Howard. The first issue of Applied Optics was released in January 1962, having had 15 months of planning, with Wakeling as Managing Editor, then as editorial consultant. She was keen for a "splashy cover (not like Newton's old diagram of a prism found on the front of JOSA)". Howard would later remark that during this period "we were, a happy chaos of scientific family: authors, editor, feature editors, columnists, referees, reporters, reviewers, copy editors, indexer and printer; each doing his own thing rather like a symphony orchestra performing Charles Ives or Stockhausen, but under the baton and watchful eye of our musical director and materfamilias Paddy Wakeling".

In the 1960s, the OSA Board considered the activities of Applied Optics as overwhelming for the OSA Executive Office, which was seeking to expand efforts in education. To this end, Wakeling left the OSA office and incorporated as WINC (Wakeling, Inc) who were contracted to perform the editorial mechanics such as page proofing and scheduling.

in 1990 the Optical Society of America presented Wakeling with the Stephen D. Fantone Distinguished Service Award for her service to the community. During her 30-year career with OSA, she held several positions in the Executive Office.

On April 1, 1991 Wakeling retired as Managing Editor of Applied Optics whilst continuing to serve as Contributing Editor. Wakeling maintained ties with the Washington science and policy scene as many government agencies and scientific societies are based there. In John Howard's article for Wakeling's retirement, he remarked "It is hard to believe, but even Paddy Wakeling seems to be mortal". As part of her Contributing Editor duties at Applied Optics, between 1991 and 1993 Wakeling would regularly compile the NASA Patter, a summary of interesting developments relevant for opticists compiled from NASA Tech Briefs.

Wakeling donated a painting sometime between 1960 and 1970 titled Ghost Horse made by Woody Crumbo, a Potawatomi artist, to the National Museum of the American Indian. She had inherited the painting from Mathew Kent Wilson.

In her memoriam, Wakeling was said to be remembered "for her enthusiasm, relentless pursuit of perfection, and ability to speak her mind, sparing no one – be it of colleagues, friends, subordinates, or authority figures."

== Death ==
Wakeling died on 21 September 2016.
