= I'm Backing Britain =

British economic campaign

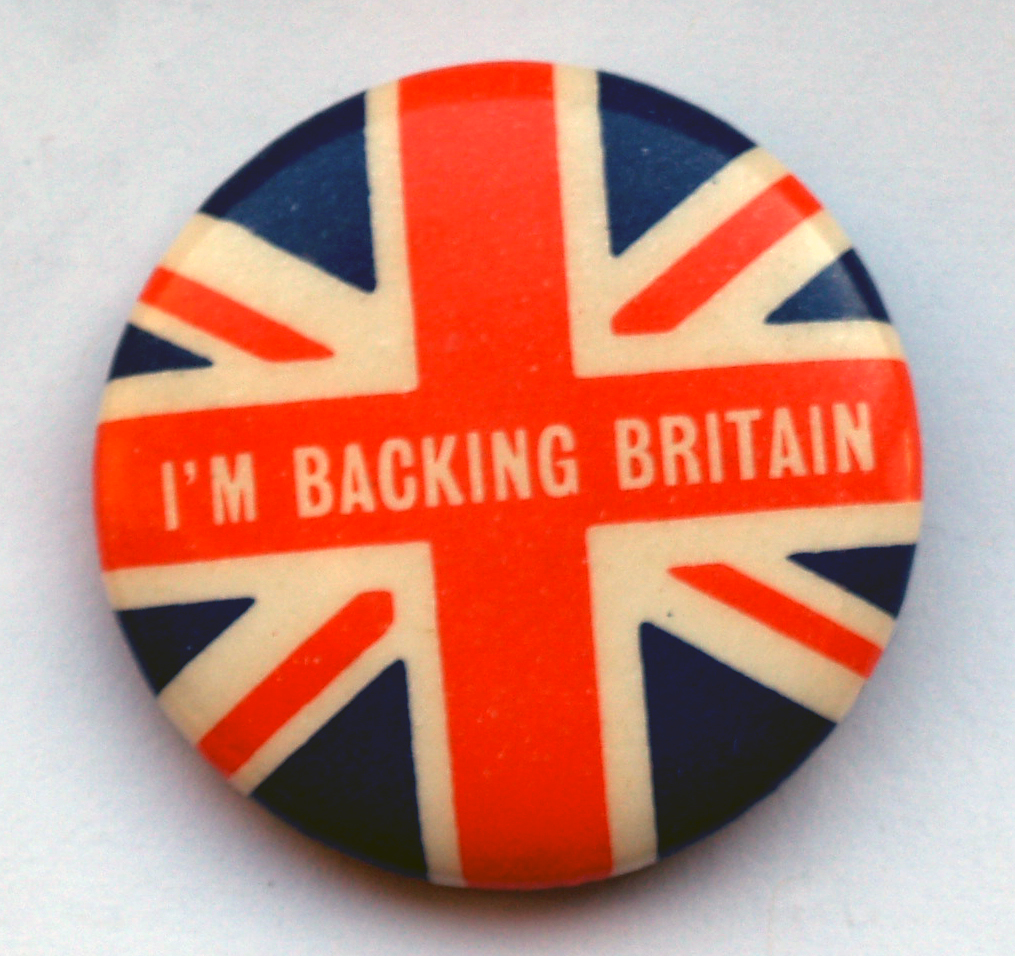
I'm Backing Britain campaign badge

"I'm Backing Britain" was a brief patriotic campaign, which flourished in early 1968 and was aimed at boosting the British economy. The campaign started spontaneously when five Surbiton secretaries volunteered to work an extra half-hour each day without pay to boost productivity and urged others to do the same. The invitation received an enormous response and a campaign took off spectacularly; it became a nationwide movement within a week. Trade unions were suspicious of, or even opposed to, the campaign, considering it as an attempt to extend working hours surreptitiously and to hide inefficiency by management.

The campaign received official endorsement by the Prime Minister, Harold Wilson, but it found that being perceived as government-endorsed was a mixed blessing. The Union Flag logo encouraged by the campaign became highly visible on the high streets, and attempts were made to take over the campaign by Robert Maxwell, who wanted to change its focus into an appeal to 'Buy British', but the campaign's own T-shirts were made in Portugal. After a few months without any noticeable effect on individual companies or the economy generally, interest flagged amid much embarrassment about some of the ways in which the campaign had been pursued and supported.

It has come to be regarded as an iconic example of a failed attempt to transform British economic prospects.

== Economic background ==
In 1967, the British economy suffered from several difficulties. Despite tax increases announced in July 1966, the 1967 budget had set the greatest deficit in post-war history of £1,000,000,000. Each month, the Board of Trade published figures of the 'balance of trade' between exports and imports which seemed to show an ever-increasing deficit. The closure of the Suez Canal after the Six-Day War hit exporters, as did an unofficial dock strike, which broke out at the end of September. Having put up the bank rate to 6 percent on 19 October, on 18 November, the government abandoned three years of attempting to maintain the exchange rate and devalued the pound sterling from $2.80 to $2.40. Although it was an economic defeat, devaluation was perceived as an export opportunity that British industry needed to seize.

Arising out of devaluation, John Boyd-Carpenter (Conservative Member of Parliament for Kingston-upon-Thames) wrote to The Times in a letter published on 13 December 1967 suggesting, "If a number of people, particularly in responsible positions, would set by an example by sacrificing say the first Saturday of every month and working on that morning without extra pay, profits or overtime, it would give an example to others at home, and show the world that we were in earnest". He complained that capital equipment stood idle from Friday afternoon to Monday morning.

== Colt Ventilation and Heating Ltd ==
On 27 December 1967, Fred Price (Marketing Director of Colt Ventilation and Heating Ltd) sent out a memo headed "General progress report", which assessed the company's economic prospects. Inspired by Boyd-Carpenter, he wrote that the balance of payments deficit would disappear overnight if the working population of the United Kingdom worked a five-and-a-half-day week without demanding higher incomes for the extra half-day. Price said that Britain would become once more the wealthiest country in the world.

The memo was received by five secretaries working in the company's head office in Surbiton, Valerie White, Joan Southwell, Carol Ann Fry, Christine French and Brenda Mumford. The next morning, they discussed it and Southwell said that she was willing to work an extra half-day a week. The others agreed, and White took the initiative of writing a reply, which she gave reference VW/OD GEN. The reply said, "What about starting this scheme of a five-and-a-half-day week? Let us be the first company to start the ball rolling". After discussing the suggestion with the other members of staff, on 29 December the 240 employees at the head office voted to report for work at 8.30 a.m. instead of 9 a.m. They also made contact with the workers employed at the company's factory in Havant, Hampshire, to encourage them to do the same.

== Campaign snowballs ==
Before the workers had a chance to work their first extra half-hour, their campaign had already begun "snowballing fast". Over the weekend of 30–31 December 1967, five other companies had already decided to follow their example, based in Portsmouth, Southend, Bicester and Manchester; others were telephoning to show their interest. The Duke of Edinburgh sent a telegram describing the campaign as "the most heartening news I heard in 1967" and wishing it success. There was a full turnout at 8:30 a.m. on 1 January at the Surbiton offices, and Havant worked their extra half-hour at the end of the day. Working with the company's managing director, Alan O'Hea, the five secretaries began to think up a slogan. After rejecting "I'm Behind Britain" for having the wrong message, they settled on "I'm Backing Britain". O'Hea then ordered (from Norprint of Boston, who supplied them free) 100,000 badges featuring a Union Flag with their slogan written across the centre and began writing to 30,000 employers to encourage them. The workers contacted leading political and industrial figures to ask for suggestions as to how others could help.

Advertising agency DPBT bought a full-page advert in The Times of 3 January 1968 offering their spare time, free, to make commercials backing the campaign. All three major political party leaders sent their support, and an all-party press conference promoted the campaign on 5 January. Not all companies joining the campaign did so by working extra unpaid hours, as some cancelled projected price increases and waived fees. The campaign extended to Wales, where the Welsh language slogan was not a direct translation but instead "Rwy'n Bacio Cymru" ("I'm Backing Wales").

== Concerns ==
While telegrams of congratulation continued to flood into Colt, the British Productivity Council was sceptical of its effectiveness. The Council pointed to the difference between productivity and output and stated that each individual firm must consider what would be appropriate in its circumstances depending on its "agreements between management and working people".

Trades Union Congress general secretary George Woodcock, while welcoming the "very good spirit" of the campaign, said that the trade unions would not foster it and that some unions would strongly oppose it. The Amalgamated Engineering Union (AEU) shop stewards at Colt's factory in Havant carefully said that workers could work the extra half-hour without pay but that it would not prejudice any decision taken by the AEU national executive. Confederation of British Industry President John Davies thought the campaign could be a kind of window-dressing such as he had recently criticised but thought it should be encouraged because of the effect it might have on people's minds.

Contrasting with the generally positive reaction from politicians, Conservative MP Enoch Powell described the campaign as silly and dangerous. He observed, "I am not accusing the Government of having suborned those Surrey typists, but the Government could not have wished for a better reinforcement for their campaign to instil into the people of Britain the conviction that it is all their own fault".

=== Trade union reaction ===
On 3 January, the AEU's Portsmouth branch ordered its members not to participate in the campaign, with its district secretary Rory McCarthy explaining that "there are many reasons why the union is against giving buckshee half hours to employers" and that employers might use it to hide inefficiencies. The workers at the factory immediately rebelled, with works convener Harry Tyler saying "no one likes being told what to do with their free time by the union" and said that some who were opposed had changed their view because of the union's attitude. Tyler was removed from his post as union branch chairman by a vote of no confidence on 5 January after members of the branch from companies not taking part in the campaign went to the regular branch meeting. Some of the secretaries who started the campaign appeared on television discussing the trade union reaction with union leaders; the trade union leaders came across as talking down to the secretaries, an attitude that was felt to have helped the campaign.

The AEU national executive instructed its members to have nothing to do with unpaid overtime, setting up a direct confrontation with the factory where more than half of the union members signed a petition backing the campaign and supporting Tyler. The union's Portsmouth district committee then convened a secret court in early February, which convicted four shop stewards at Colt of discrediting the union and imposed punishments suspending the men from holding office in the union for between one and five years. On hearing the news, forty Conservative backbench MPs put down a motion in the House of Commons demanding government action to "stop this type of petty trade union tyranny, which is so completely contrary to the best traditions of the freedom-loving British trade union movement".

Other trade unionists were generally sceptical. Clive Jenkins, general secretary of the Association of Scientific, Technical and Managerial Staffs, thought it was a "confidence trick" and observed that "when the British ruling class is in trouble it wraps itself in the Union Jack". Twenty years later, the managing director of Colt admitted that he had received hate mail about the campaign and had arranged for the women to be chaperoned.

== Press comment ==
Popular newspapers backed the campaign enthusiastically and praised the workers behind it. As early as 30 December 1967, the Daily Express ran the headline "Five Girls Britain Can be Proud of" over a picture of the five originators with Fred Price. The Daily Mirror welcomed the spread of the campaign as its lead story on 3 January. Despite its traditional Labour and trade union sympathies, it supported the Colt shop stewards against the union leadership. A Mirror editorial on 5 January declared that "the patriotic truth about these rule-book dominated trade union sourpusses is that they are incapable of recognising true patriotism when they see it".

The Economist wrote on 6 January that on hearing of the campaign, "the fashionable response in many sophisticated circles was a giggle", but it had transformed into "something louder than a grunt of admiration". The newspaper concluded that the campaign "may very well have accomplished, in the past week, the extraordinary feat of edging a national mood just an odd half-degree in the right direction". Likewise, the Financial Times regarded it as "a beacon of light in an otherwise dismal economic and industrial prospect" but encouraged the diversion of the campaign into opposing absenteeism and restrictive practices as well as encouraging individuals "to identify their efforts with the success or failure of the country as a whole".

A week later, the Economist leader was slightly more wary about the campaign and saw it as a symptom of widespread disenchantment with politics and thinking Britain lucky that "there is no demagogue of sufficient ability around to exploit it". The New Statesman admitted that "in strictly economic terms", the campaign to work extra hours made sense, but pointed to some of the oddities of the campaign, including the Birmingham betting shop, which had opened early as a contribution to the production drive, and the Portsmouth workers, who demanded to leave early so they could see a television programme about the scheme.

== Popular campaign ==
=== Theme song ===
On Monday 8 January, Pye Records issued a 45 rpm single of the song "I'm Backing Britain" supporting the campaign. Written by Tony Hatch and Jackie Trent, and sung by Bruce Forsyth, the chorus included "The feeling is growing, so let's keep it going, the good times are blowing our way". All involved in making the single took cuts in their fees or royalties so that the single sold for 5 shillings instead of the going rate of 7s 4 1/2d. Forsyth happily endorsed the campaign: "The country has always done its best when it is up against the wall. If everyone realises what we are up against we can get out of trouble easily." However, the song did not make the charts; it sold only 7319 copies. Reviewing the single, Derek Johnson of the New Musical Express commented "If you fancy five bob's worth of propaganda, good luck to you."

=== Flags ===
The most visible manifestation of the campaign was in the Union Flags, which begin to be put on shopping bags. Even the Prime Minister noted that everyone seemed to be carrying them. Postmaster General Edward Short encouraged the Royal Mail to introduce an "I'm Backing Britain" franking mark, which was used on 84 million letters passing through 125 Post Offices between 9 and 29 February. Increased visibility of the Union Flag distressed some commentators. Philip French, writing in the New Statesman, described being "constantly confronted" by the flag as "one of the more painful aspects" of the campaign.

=== Donations ===
The campaign found expression in the giving of conscience money to the Exchequer, as noted by The Guardian's Financial Editor William Davis; in the middle of January, it was observed that every postal delivery to the Treasury contained letters offering gifts. If the letter specified that the money was to pay off the Government debt, the funds were paid into the Debt Redemption Fund; otherwise the Consolidated Fund was the beneficiary. Disc jockey and sex offender Jimmy Savile found his own way to support the campaign by volunteering to work nine days as a hospital porter at Leeds General Infirmary over two months, stating that at his rate of pay, nine days' work would have earned him £1,600 (equivalent to £20,000 in 2025).

=== Portuguese T-shirts ===
The campaign took a knock when the London wholesaler Scott Lester ordered thousands of white T-shirts on which it screen-printed the "I'm Backing Britain" slogan; the shirts had been made in Portugal. Scott Lester's marketing director explained that "we just cannot find a British T-shirt which will give us the same quality at a price which will compare" and that the shirts would have to retail at £1 if British sources were used. Labour MP Charles Mapp urged the Government to ban the shirts.

=== Poet Laureate ===
The newly appointed Poet Laureate, Cecil Day-Lewis, inaugurated his appointment with a poem entitled "Now and Then" supporting the campaign. It was commissioned by the Daily Mail and appeared on the newspaper's front page on 5 January; The poem compared Britain's economic plight in 1968 with the Blitz and ended:

To work then, islanders, as men and women
Members one of another, looking beyond
Mean rules and rivalries towards the dream you could
Make real, of glory, common wealth, and home.

— Cecil Day-Lewis, "Now and Then",

Day-Lewis's choice of subject and the content of his poem were criticised. Bernard Levin later wrote that the poem "made many regret their impulsive rejoicing at the death of his predecessor".

== Takeover ==
Such was the response coming into Colt that they found themselves overwhelmed and needed someone else to take it over. It asked the Industrial Society, a nonpartisan body to promote the best use of human resources in commerce and industry, which agreed and began to set up an organisation to run it. The society recruited 11 extra full-time staff in January 1968 for the campaign, and appointed Admiral of the Fleet Sir Caspar John as its figurehead. The campaign was handled on a day-to-day basis by Mark Wolfson, the Head of Youth Services for the Society.

The Guardian's Financial Editor William Davis had already noted in his column of 10 January that attention was moving away from the idea of providing free labour. The Industrial Society also stressed that working extra half-hours was "a tiny part" of the national campaign and criticised people who tried to make anti-union propaganda out of the reaction to the case. Industrial Society director John Garnett pointed to tanker drivers who had switched from 56 hours driving slowly per week to 42 hours of faster driving. The Society convened a group of industrialists and leading trade unionists to reshape the official aims of the campaign. The Society found it difficult to make progress in getting the campaign adopted in more workplaces because of suspicion about their motives. A campaign adviser told the Daily Mirror that many assumed they were connected to the Labour Party and "without its political flavour, I am sure the campaign would have been taken a lot more seriously".

=== Robert Maxwell's 'Buy British' campaign ===
According to his biographer Joe Haines, the Labour Member of Parliament Robert Maxwell had the idea for a popular 'Buy British' campaign around the same time as the 'I'm Backing Britain' campaign emerged. Through an intermediary, Maxwell approached broadcaster David Frost, who gave a personal donation of £1,000 and invited Maxwell to appear on his television show on 5 January. On television Maxwell told viewers to "think before buying. Buy the home product or service first whenever you can, even if it means buying less for a time". Maxwell tried to amalgamate his campaign with that of the Industrial Society, but the Society refused him. He therefore set up a rival "Help Britain Group".

Maxwell obtained letters of support from well-known personalities and launched his campaign with full-page press adverts on 7 February. The adverts, topped with pictures of the three main party leaders, urged readers to "Act on just six of the uncranky suggestions on this page" and listed those who had supported him.

One of those named, Bernard Delfont, was upset when his support was revealed, feeling that Maxwell should have asked him before doing so. Critics pointed to the fact that Maxwell's Pergamon Press printed a large number of its textbooks and scientific journals in Eastern European countries.

According to Maxwell's widow, Elizabeth, his campaign won "the hearts and minds of countless ordinary workers around Britain". However Maxwell dropped the 'Buy British' part of his campaign by the end of February (retitling it 'Sell British, Help Britain, Help Yourself'), and he wound up the whole thing in March. Maxwell's unofficial biographer, Tom Bower, noted that Maxwell succeeded in becoming the nationally recognised personality of the whole 'Backing Britain' campaign, but former Maxwell editor Roy Greenslade noted that Maxwell was "a rogue politician" whose protectionist campaign was a "fruitless [cause]".

== Political influence ==
At an after-dinner speech in Burnley on 8 January, Prime Minister Harold Wilson criticised those who were "complaining that the other fellow is not pulling his weight" including trade unionists who pointed to the failures of individual employers. Wilson declared "What we want is 'back Britain', not back-biting". Wilson, who later wrote that the campaign "was a helpful and robust response to the gloom and near-defeatism" after devaluation, put Edmund Dell, Under-Secretary at the Department of Economic Affairs, in charge of government assistance. Dell visited Colt on 8 January 1968 but kept his assistance largely concealed.

Cabinet minister Richard Crossman wrote in his diary on 7 January that the expanding campaign was a "political windfall" but that it was "something we should have nothing to do with". The Labour Party found itself in difficulty when it ordered 2,000 posters with the slogan "Back Britain with Labour" for local Labour Parties to display. After a complaint from a member of the Industrial Society, the posters were withdrawn. The Industrial Society also reported resisting an attempt by the Conservative Party to "borrow" the slogan for political purposes.

== Campaign winds down ==
After the AEU banned the four Colt shop stewards from office, the shop stewards recommended to the workers at the Havant factory on 10 February that they stop working unpaid overtime because of the strife it had brought to the union, but the works director thought that the workers would in fact continue and pointed to the fact that the AEU was not the only union present. Joan Southwell, one of the original five secretaries at the head office, said that they would definitely continue as "we are all very solid about this in spite of the union disagreement". However, on 12 February the workers decided by a narrow majority to return to normal working hours.

In early February, The Times went round to ask supermarket chains what the campaign was achieving and found that it varied between "very little" and "none at all". By the middle of March, the Industrial Society was hinting that it needed a grant from the government to keep going. It had encouraged local civic leaders across the country to set up local committees of industrialists and trade unionists. The television series Dad's Army, the opening episode of which was recorded on 15 April 1968, began with a contemporary scene in which Alderman Mainwaring was the chairman of the Walmington-on-Sea "I'm Backing Britain" campaign.

Another reference to the campaign appeared in the title of a newspaper comic strip collection. From a distance, its title appeared to read The Perishers Back Britain. Only on closer inspection could the full title be read: The Perishers: Back Again to Pester Britain.

The Sunday Times ran a large article by Nicholas Tomalin on 3 March about "the serious and comic history of a patriotic idea". Tomalin quoted one of the original Surbiton typists as saying that "we got mixed-up when asked horrid questions about trade unions. Thanks to all the interviews and things, we just didn't get any typing done". Also in March, the campaign moved from the Industrial Society's headquarters at Bryanston Square to rent-free offices donated by National Cash Register. It was immediately noted that National Cash Register was a wholly owned subsidiary of an American corporation. The Industrial Society's staff working on the campaign were down to four in May 1968.

Maxwell declared his campaign was officially over on 5 August. The Industrial Society was still receiving about 15 letters a day, but its campaign was limited to sending out badges and promotional material to people who had requested them, and it declared that the campaign office would close at the end of September.

Retrospectively, Bernard Levin saw that the enthusiasm had subsided "after a month or two" and that the badges and slogans were seen no more. The movement was derided in the contemporary British comedy film Carry On Up the Khyber, which was released in November 1968. The ending shows the Union Flag emblazoned with the slogan "I'm Backing Britain" while a character exclaims to camera "Of course, they're all mad you know".

== Reaction ==
There was a widespread feeling, even while the campaign was going on, that it was fundamentally risible. New Statesman columnist Philip French thought its "jingoism and intellectual dishonesty" was offensive and felt that the excessive press coverage defied comment "other than the gesture of laughing at" it. The magazine itself ran a one-off column, to go with its long-established "This England" column, featuring press cuttings highlighting absurd aspects of the campaign. The Communist Morning Star newspaper published a parody of the Maxwell advert, which claimed to be "non-political, non-partisan and nonsensical" and proclaimed the support of nonsense poets Edward Lear and Lewis Carroll. Paul McCartney wrote a parody song called "I'm Backing the UK", which eventually became "Back in the U.S.S.R." on the Beatles' "White Album" (1968).

The first episode of what was to be the long-running Dad's Army sitcom, shown on 31 July 1968, begins with a pre-title sequence flashforward showing the lead characters at a dinner to launch the Walmington-on-Sea "I'm Backing Britain" campaign event. At the conclusion of the film Carry On... Up the Khyber, made during the summer and opening in November 1968, the raising of a Union Flag with the "I'm Backing Britain" slogan is greeted by Peter Butterworth turning to camera and saying: "Of course, they're all raving mad, you know!"

== See also ==
- Whip Inflation Now
- Domestic sourcing
- Stakhanovism

BBC Radio 4 broadcast in September 2018 a 45-minute radio play We're Backing Britain by David Morley, dramatising the events.
