= Whip Inflation Now =

1974 US government campaign

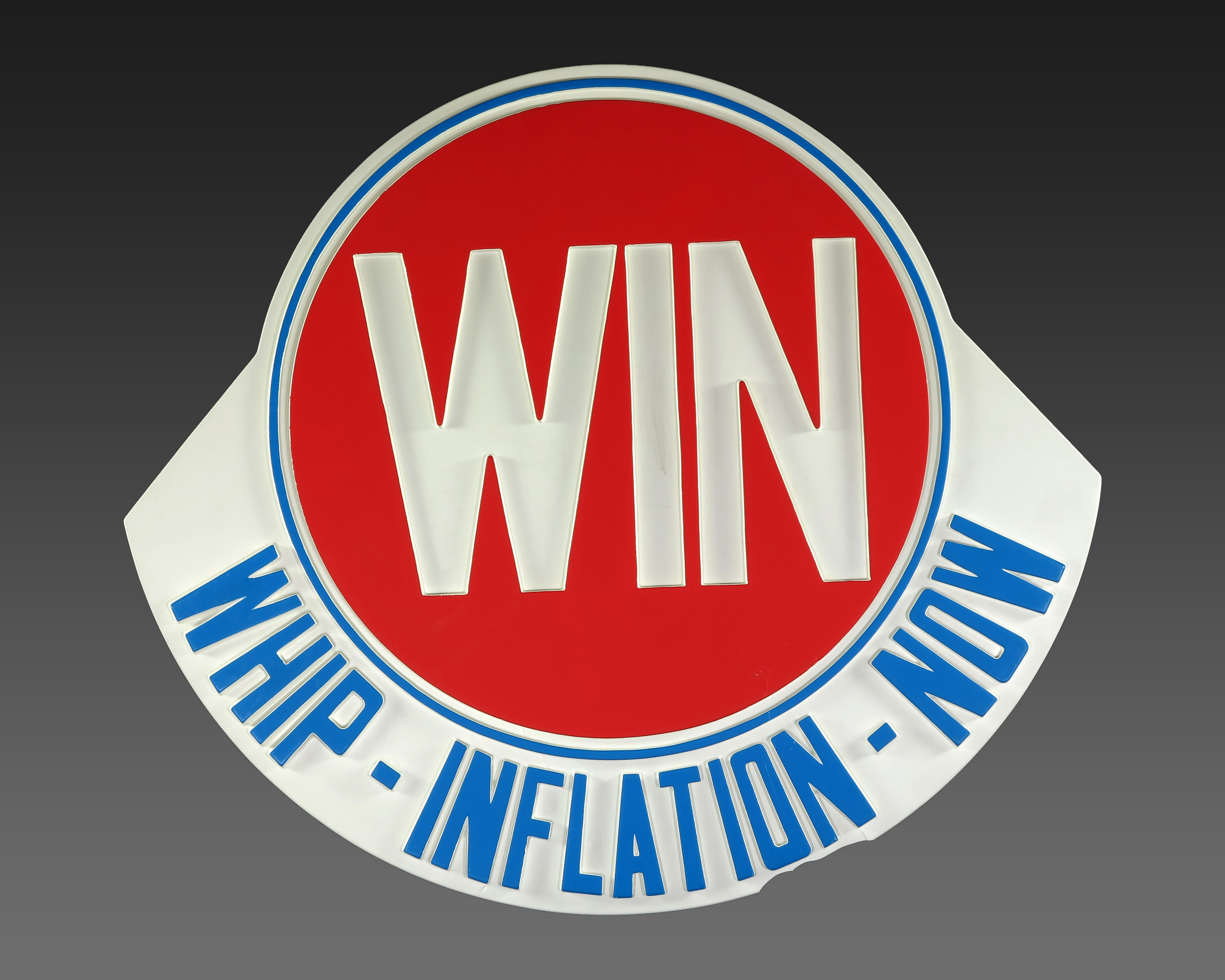
Plastic "WIN" sign

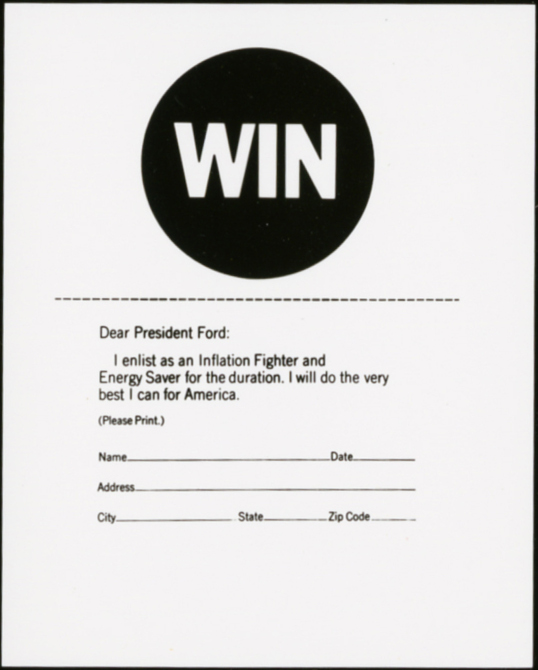
The WIN form was made available on the day of Ford's Whip Inflation Now speech. It read "Dear President Ford: I enlist as an inflation fighter and Energy Saver for the duration. I will do the very best I can for America." The form was mailed to the president and the sender would receive a WIN button.

Whip Inflation Now (WIN) was a 1974 United States government public relations campaign which attempted to spur a grassroots movement to combat inflation. Urged by President Gerald Ford, it encouraged personal savings and disciplined spending habits in combination with public measures. The unsuccessful campaign was withdrawn in March 1975 after public backlash, and it was later described as "one of the biggest government public relations blunders ever".

Those who supported the mandatory and voluntary measures were encouraged to wear "WIN" buttons, perhaps in hope of evoking in peacetime the kind of solidarity and voluntarism symbolized by the V-campaign during World War II.

== Campaign ==
Gerald Ford took office upon the resignation of Richard Nixon in August 1974 amidst one of the worst economic crises in US history, marked by high unemployment and inflation rising to 12.3% that year following the 1973 oil crisis; this was popularly described as "stagflation". As a Republican, Ford favored the WIN campaign's emphasis on addressing the problem through the voluntary actions of individuals instead of price controls imposed by "big government".

Ford launched the WIN campaign in an address before Congress on October 8, 1974, declaring inflation "public enemy number one". He announced proposals for public and private anti-inflationary efforts across many sectors, including carpooling, reducing oil imports, a one‐year tax increase for corporations, reduced thermostat use, home vegetable gardens, and retailers holding or reducing prices. A new 18-member inflation-fighting committee, led by journalist Sylvia Porter, had members ranging from consumer protection activist Ralph Nader to United States Chamber of Commerce president Arch Boot. As Ford exhorted the nation to begin a "massive mobilization", he wore a red button with "WIN" on his breast pocket, a word which he said "tells it all" because "win we will". Ford offered identical pins for citizens who enlisted by mail as "Inflation Fighters"; however, he had the only pin in existence at the time. Within a week, an ad hoc group had been assembled from various federal agencies to manage the 80,000 pieces of mail in response to the campaign, most of which were requests for "WIN" buttons.

The "WIN" buttons immediately became objects of ridicule. Retailers of "everything from used cars to pizza" used the message as a gimmick to drive sales, which encouraged increased consumer spending behavior instead of curbing it as Ford had hoped. A McDonald's radio ad depicted a father describing inflation followed by an announcer declaring a fifty-cent children's special with a hamburger, fries, and a soft drink: when asked "Well, son, how do you like fighting inflation?" the father's child replies "It tastes good." Skeptics wore the buttons upside down and joked that "NIM" stood for "Nonstop Inflation Merry-go-round" or "Need Immediate Money"; White House Press Secretary Ron Nessen said that "NIM" stood for "No Immediate Miracles". A New York Daily News columnist joked that "55% of the country can’t afford WIN buttons."

By March 10, Porter announced the program had failed and would be halted: "As an acronym, it is dead, and God bless it." Media memorialized the "WIN" campaign as "one of the great fizzles of American history".

Future Chair of the Federal Reserve Alan Greenspan, then the newly-appointed chair of the Council of Economic Advisers, went along with the campaign reluctantly, but would recall in his 2007 memoir The Age of Turbulence that he considered the concept "unbelievable stupidity" and was "horrified" by the "surreal" pitch meeting for the campaign. According to historian Yanek Mieczkowski, the public campaign was never meant to be the centerpiece of the anti-inflation program.

== Gallery ==
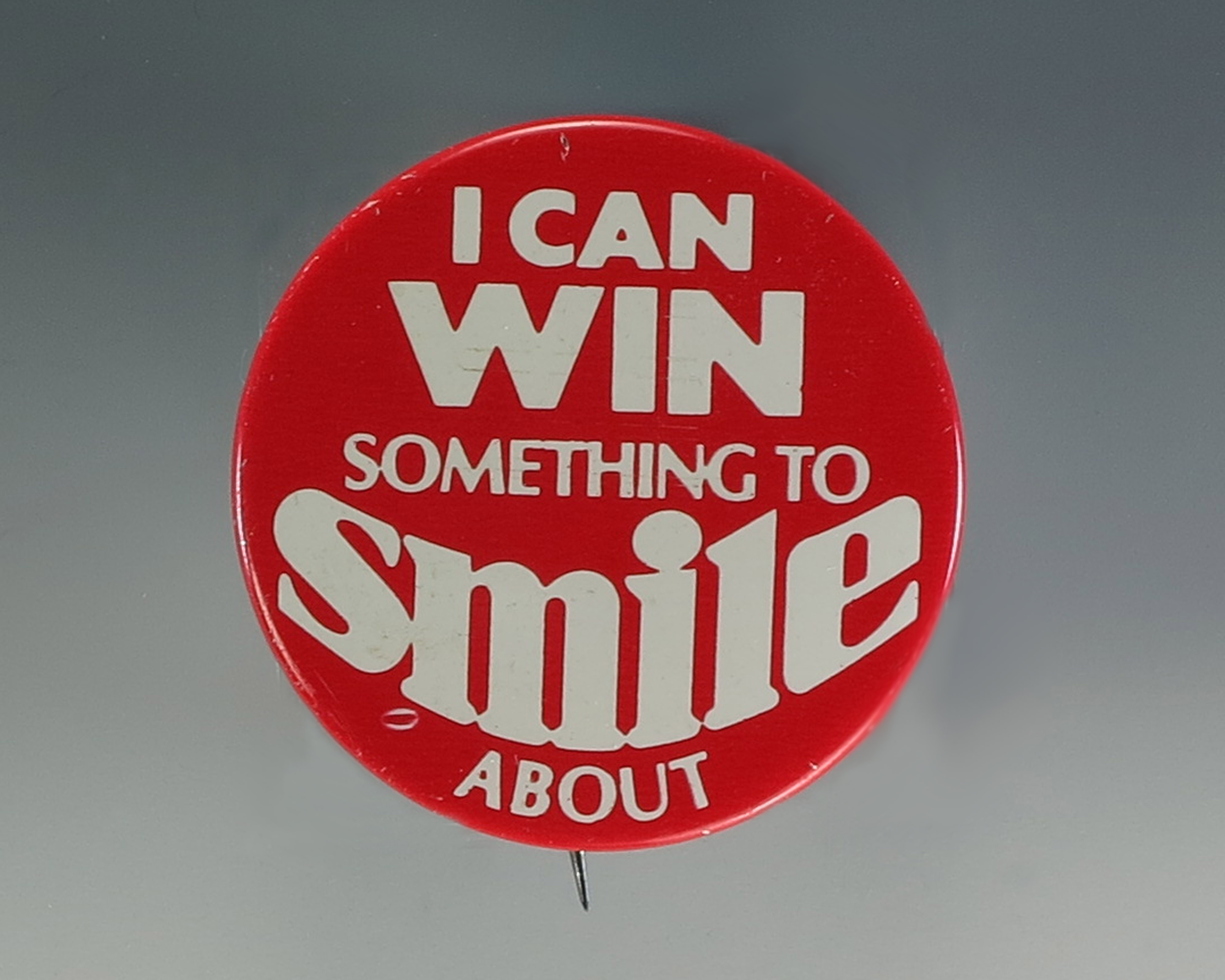
"I can WIN" button

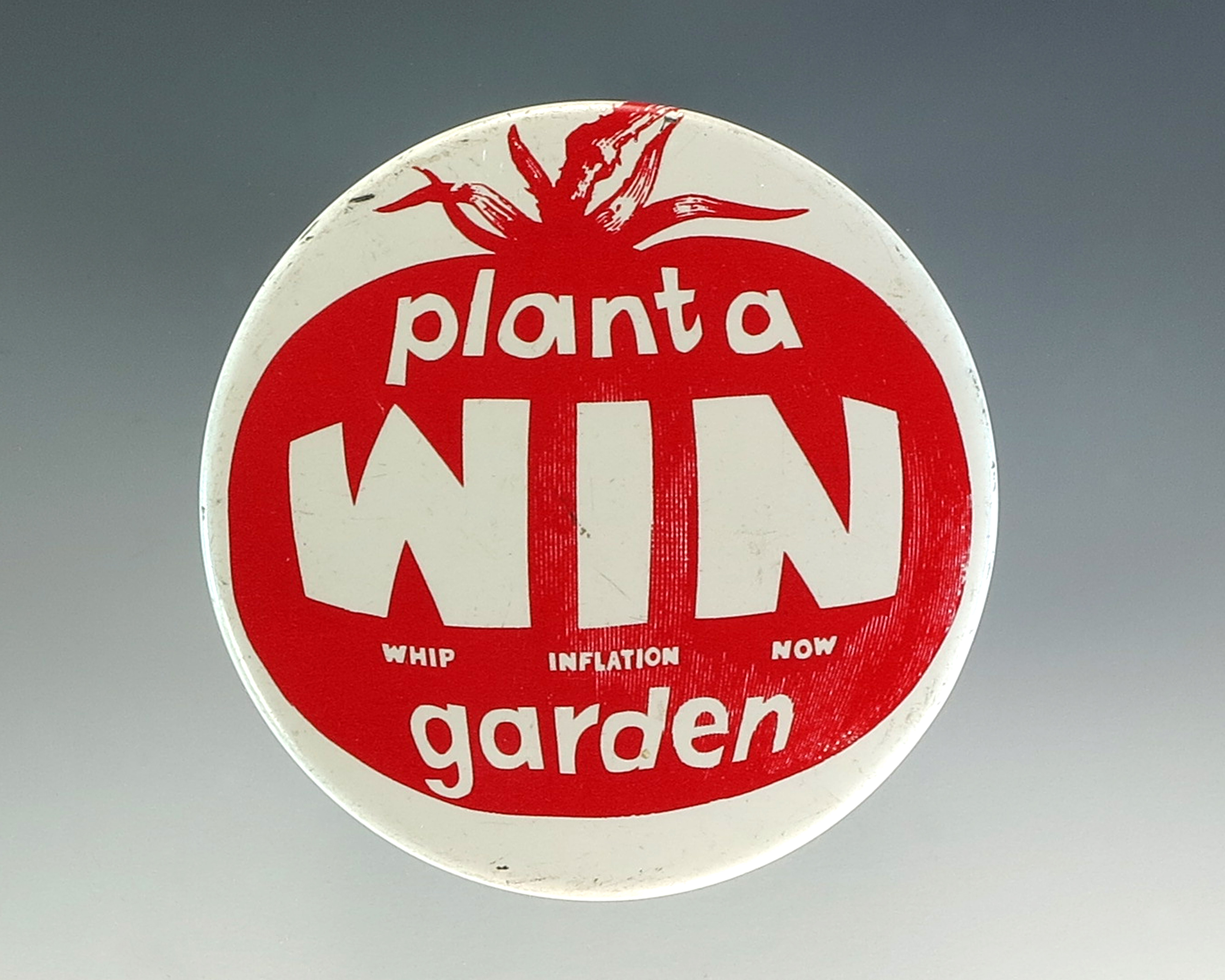
"Plant a WIN garden" button

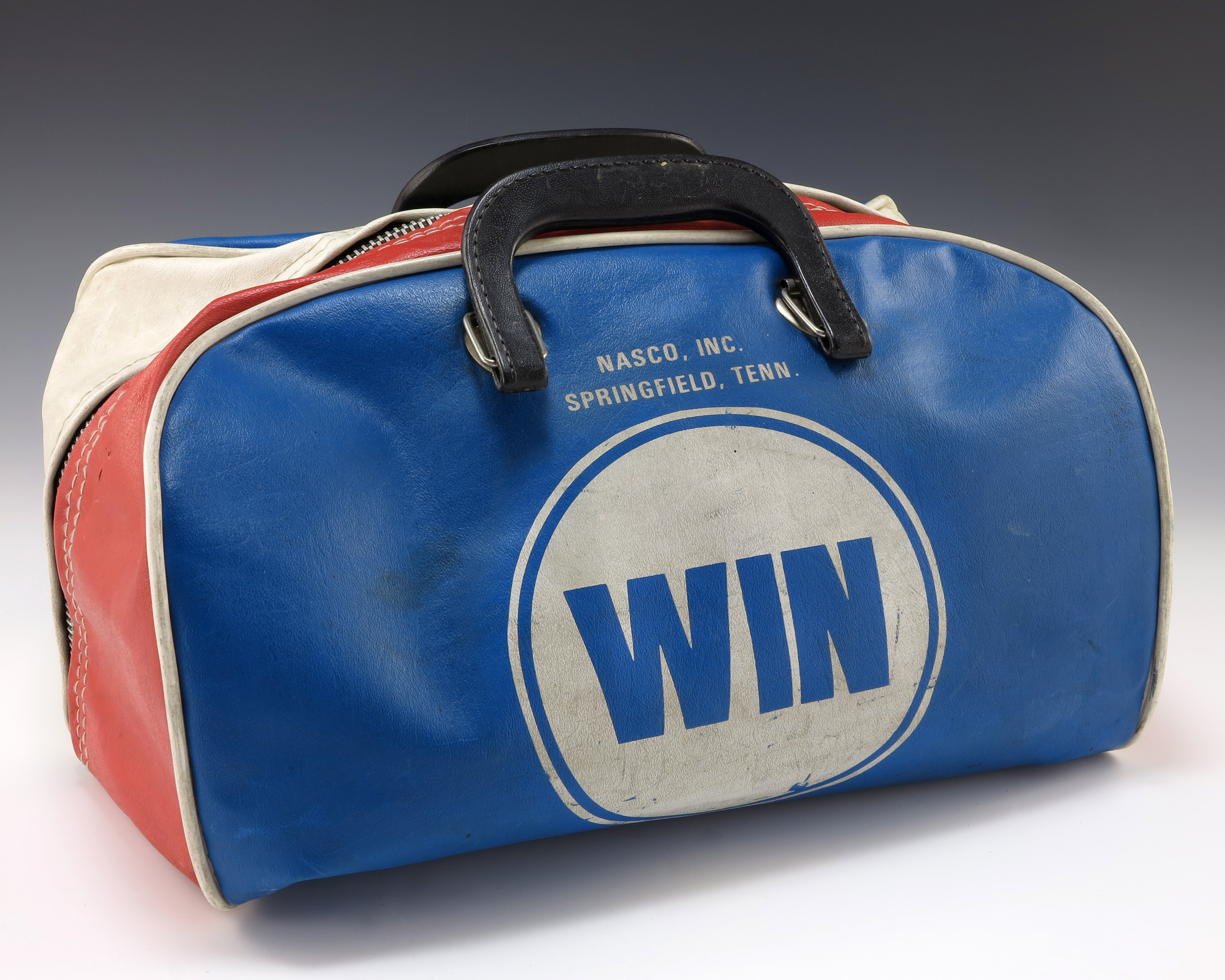
"WIN" bag

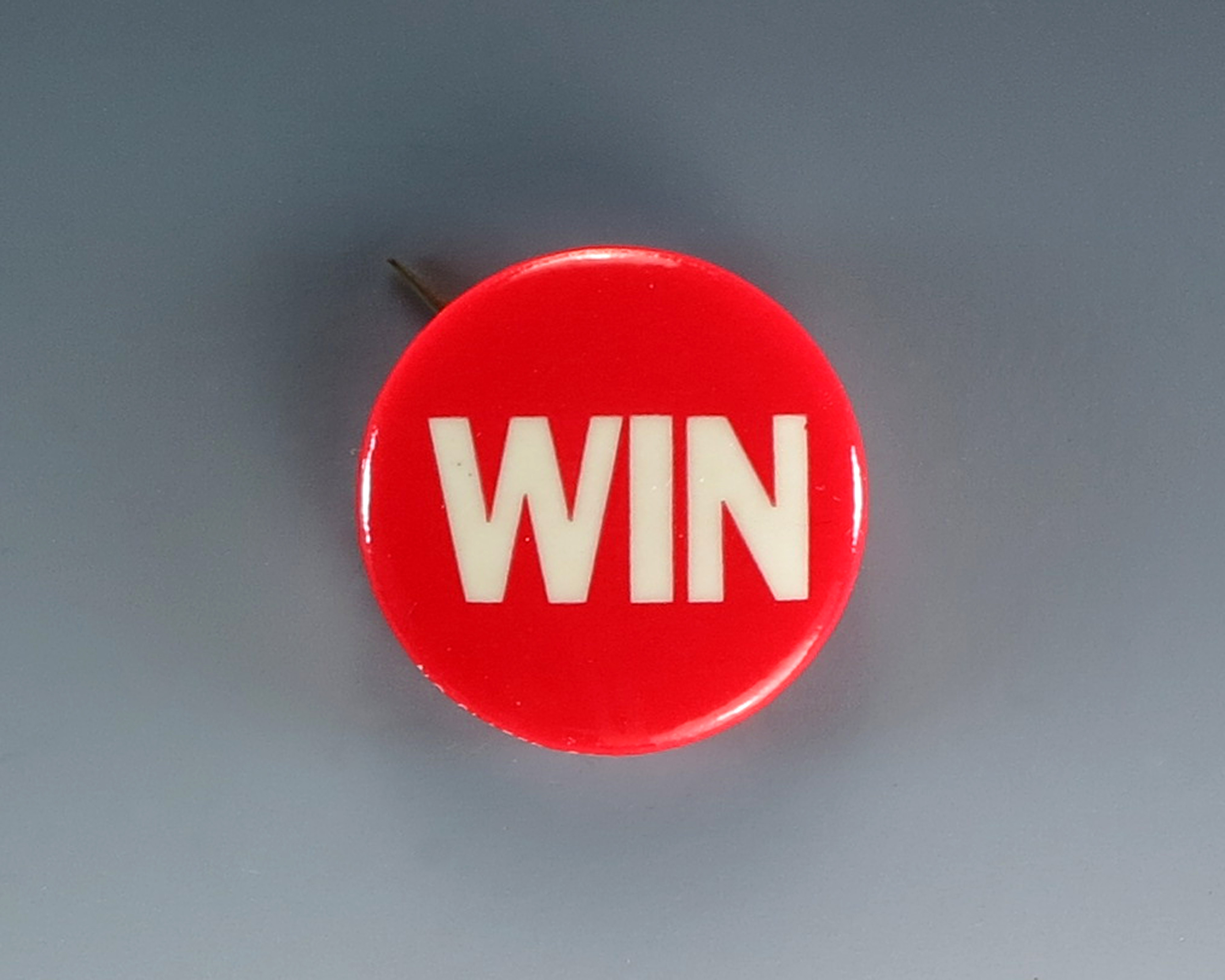
"WIN" button

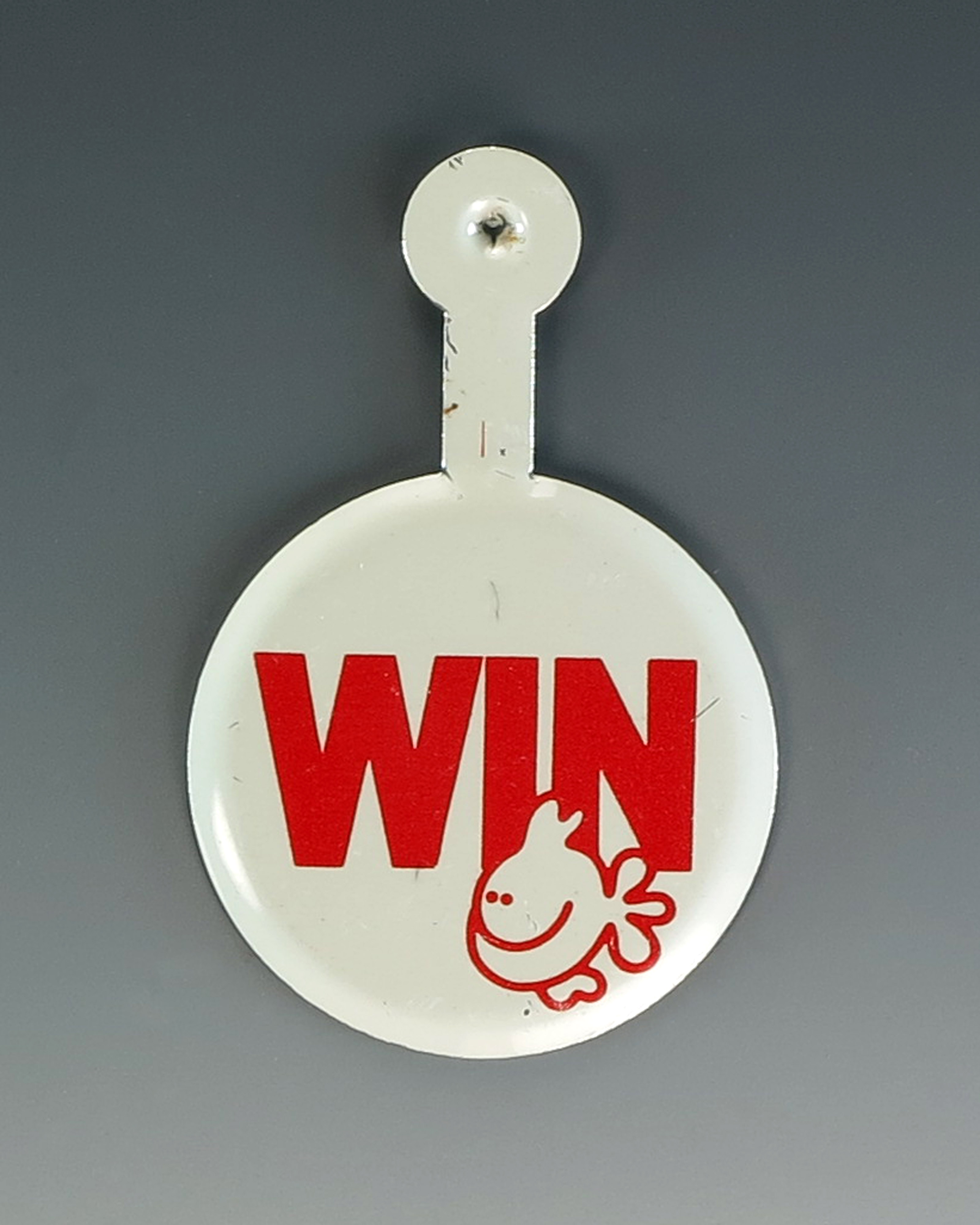
"WIN" campaign tab

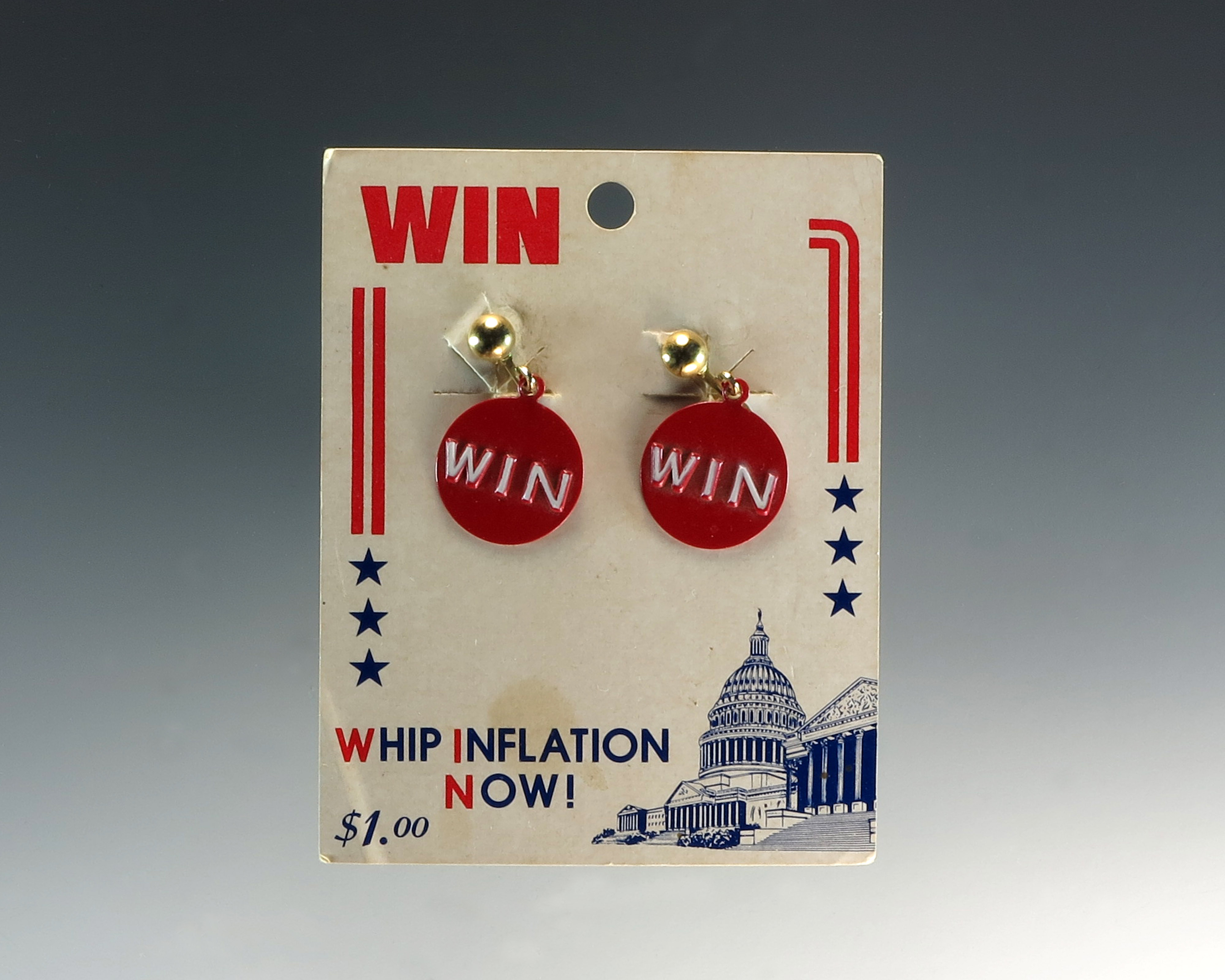
"WIN" earrings

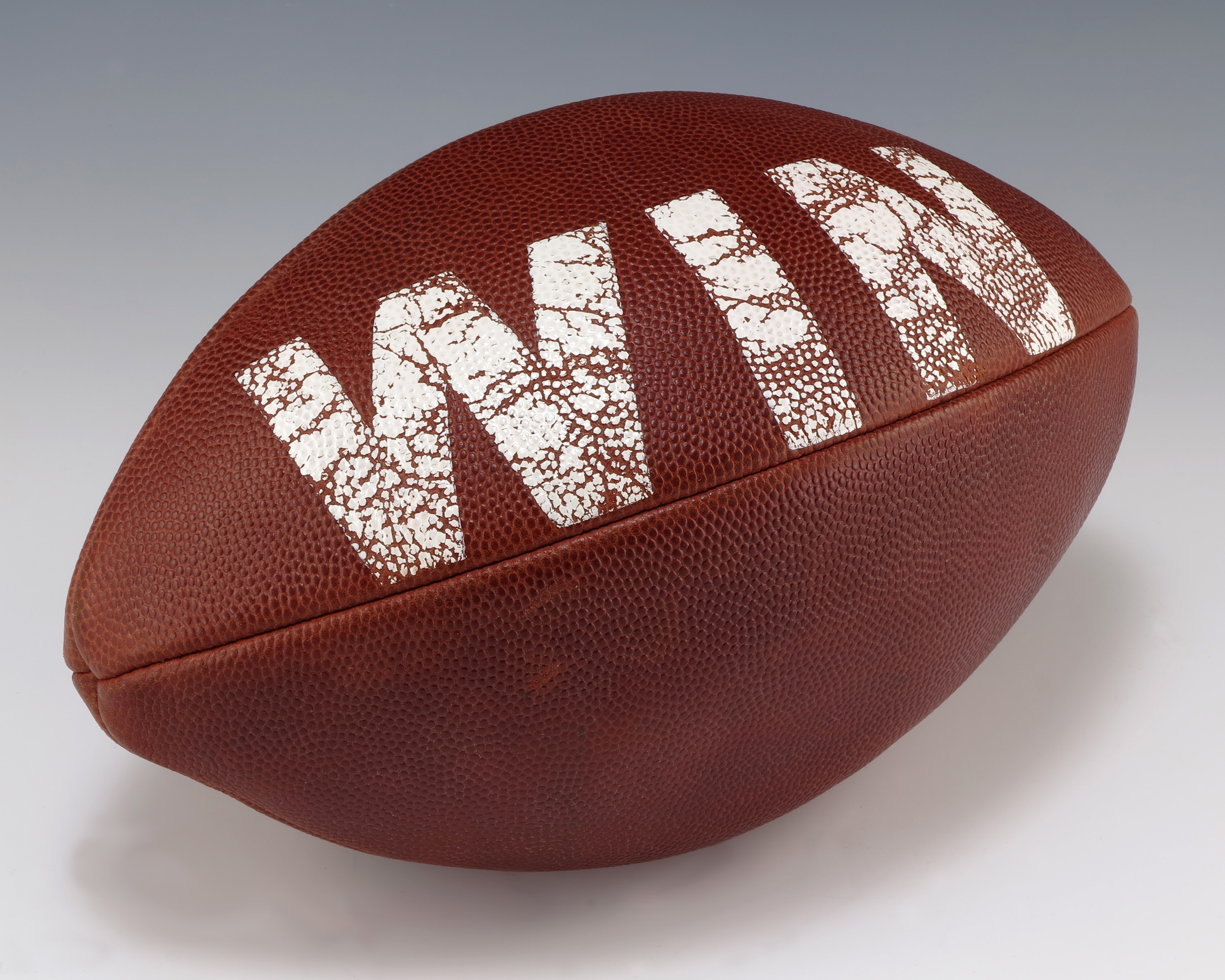
"WIN" football

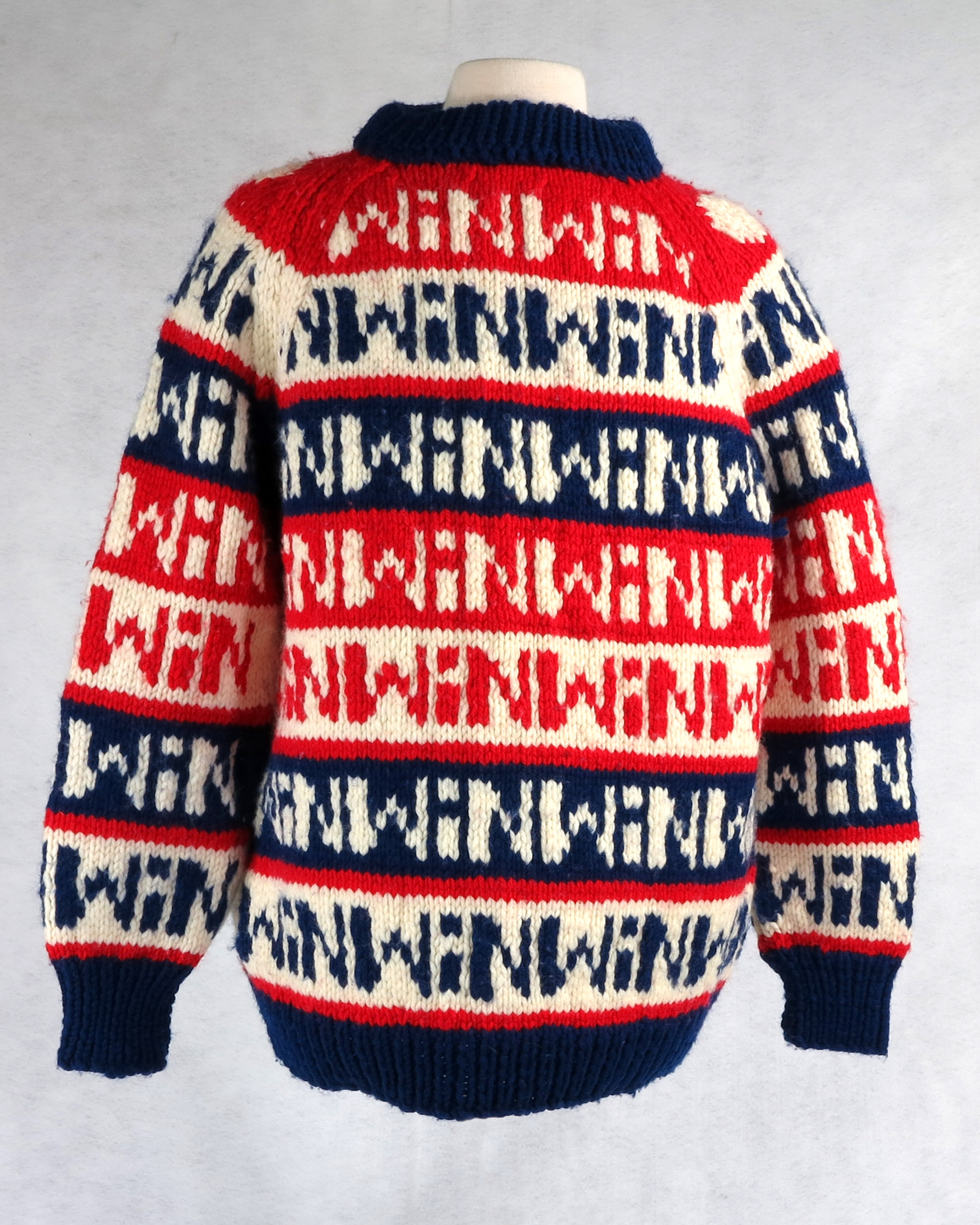
"WIN" patterned sweater

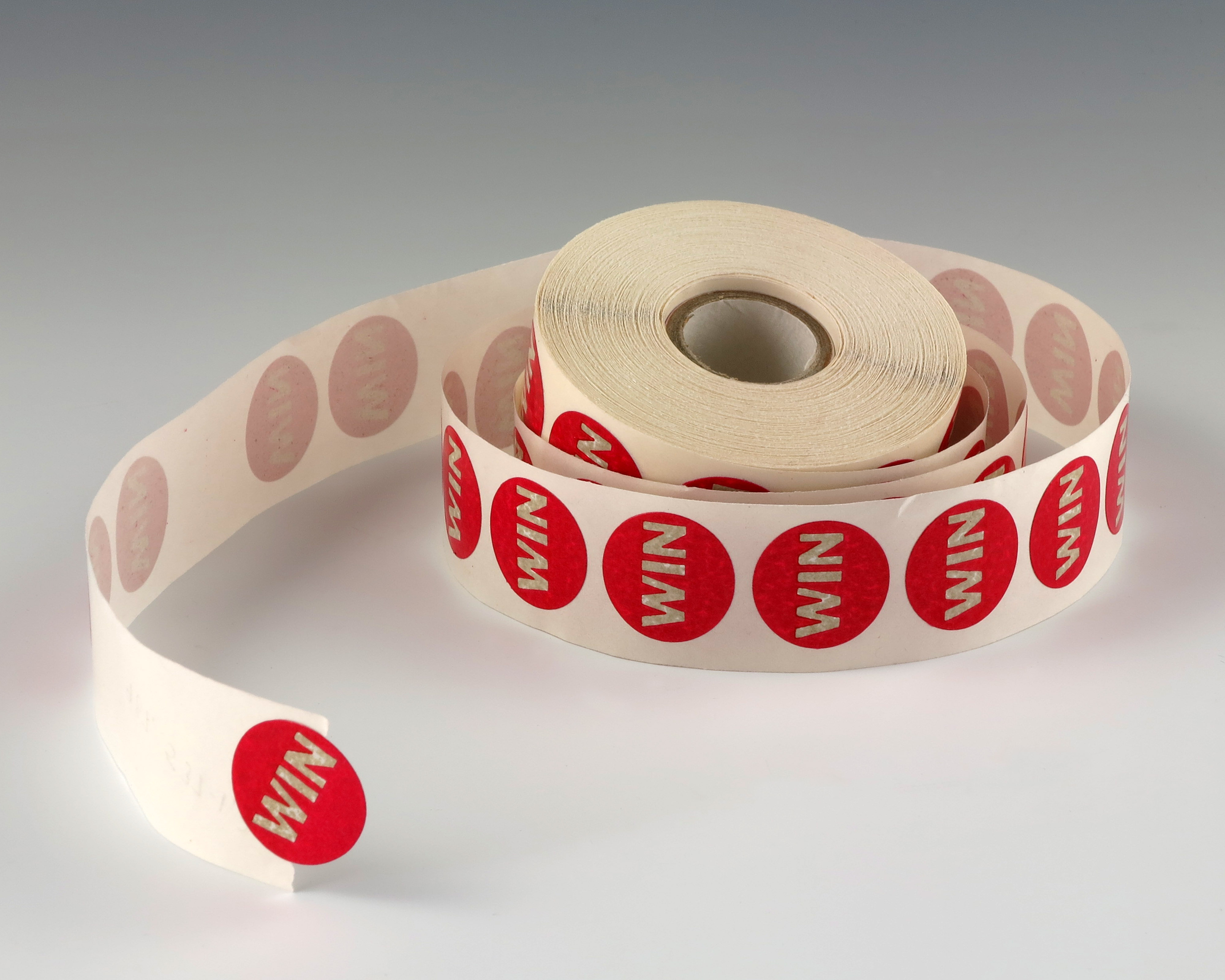
"WIN" stickers

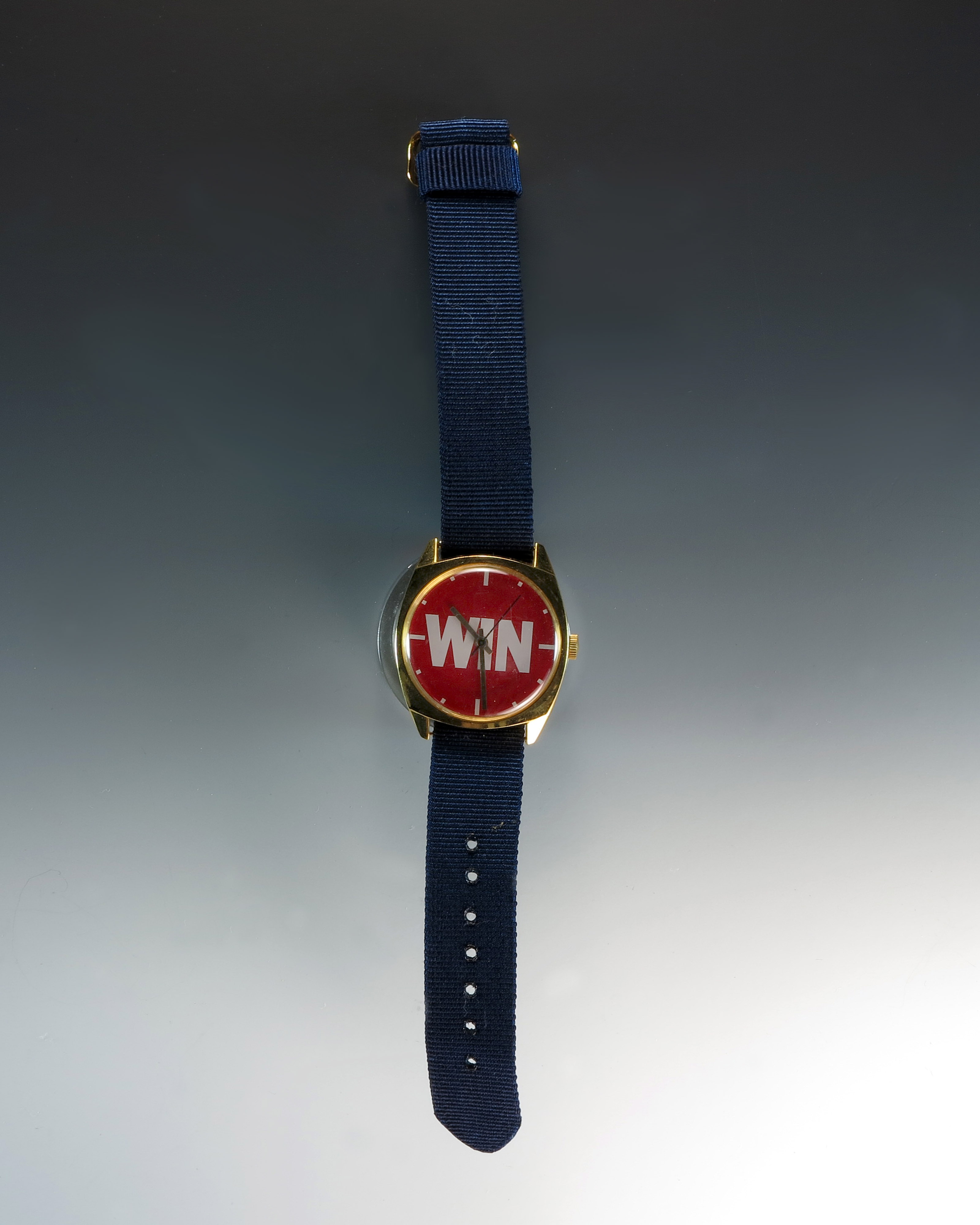
"WIN" wristwatch

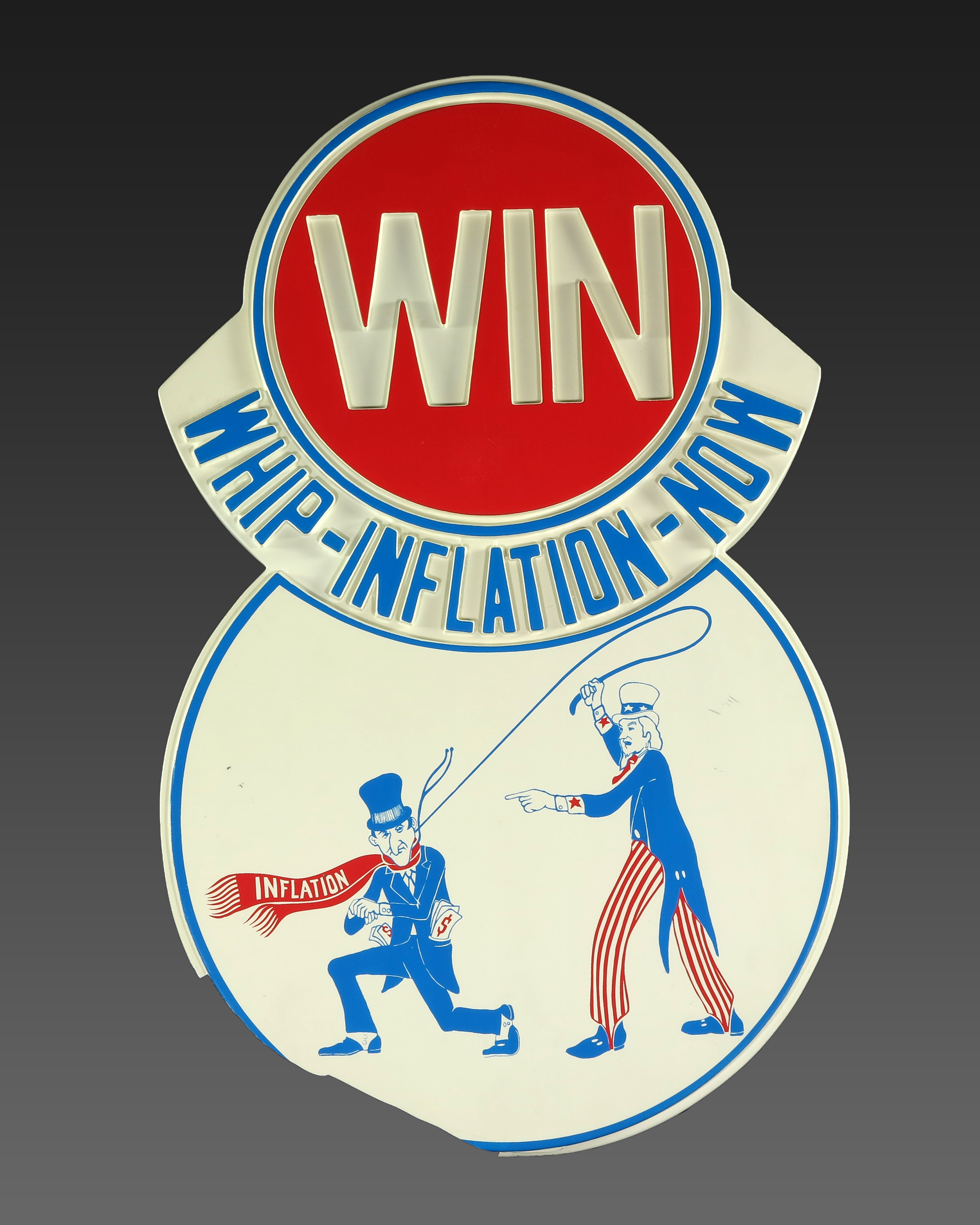
"WIN"sign

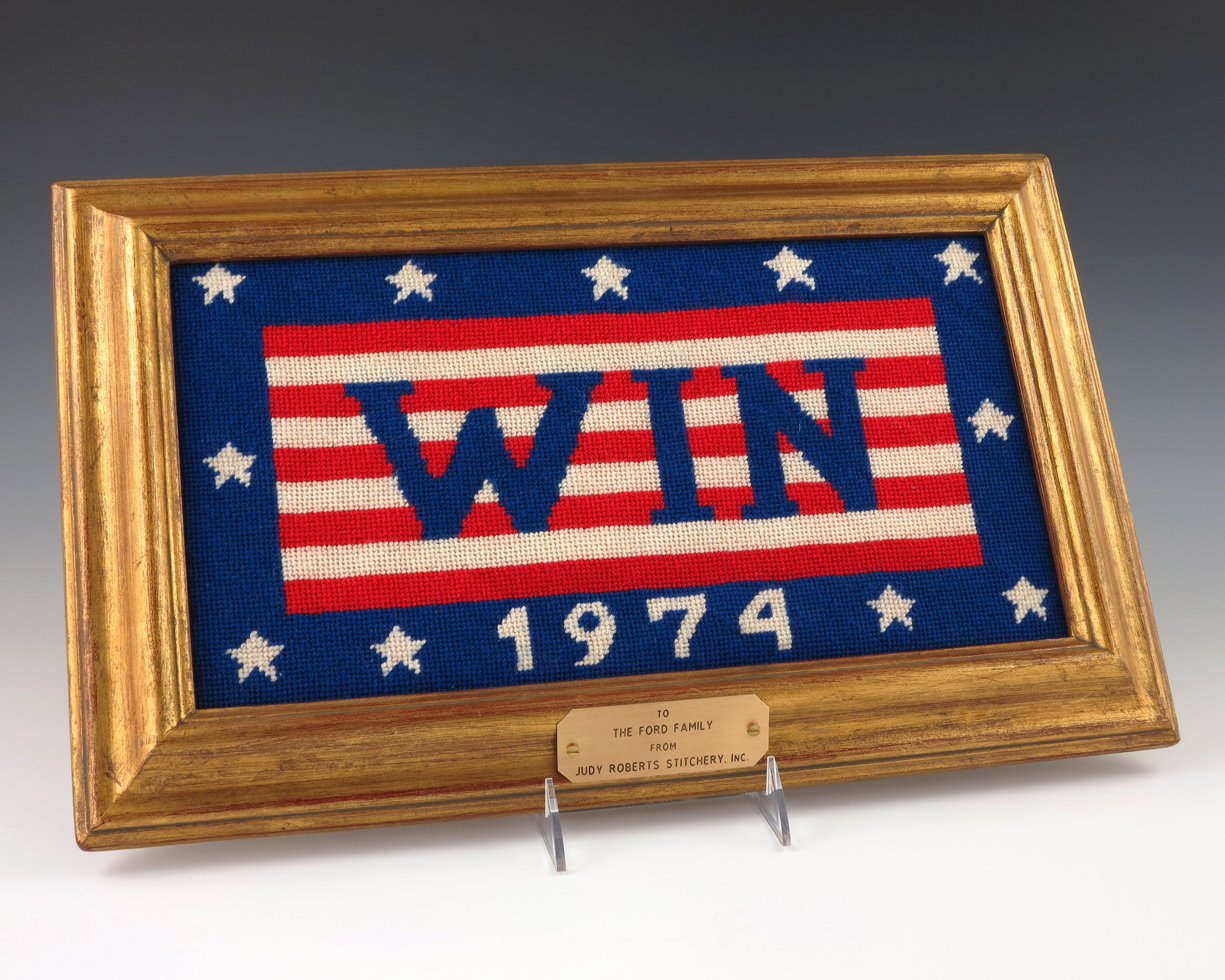
WIN needlework picture

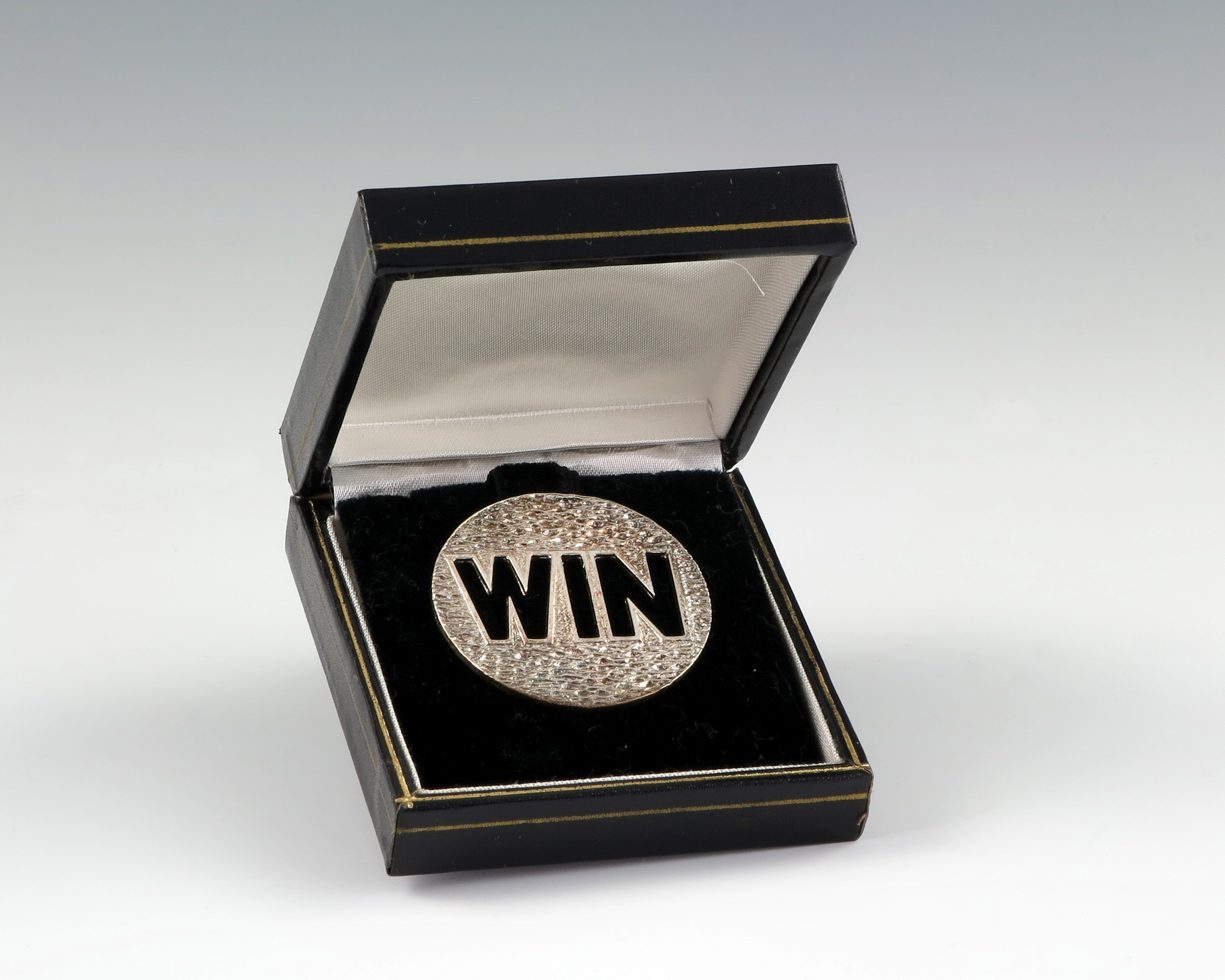
WIN pin

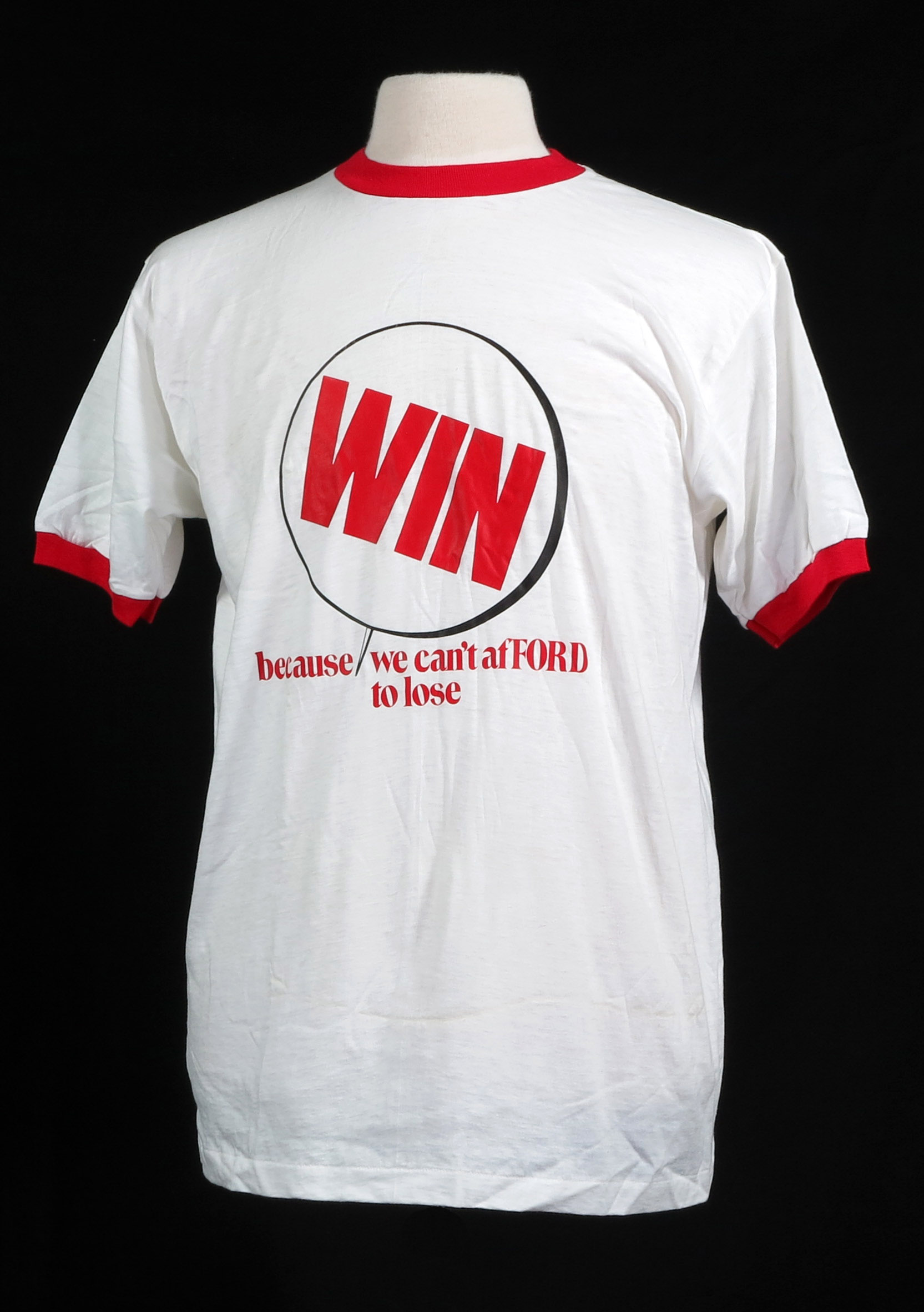
WIN T-shirt

== See also ==
- I'm Backing Britain
- Inflation Reduction Act
