= Applied Optics =

- Discipline: Optics
- Language: English
- Edited by: Gisele Bennett

Publication details
- History: 1962–present
- Publisher: Optica (society)
- Frequency: 36/year
- Open access: Hybrid
- Impact factor: 1.7 (2025)

Standard abbreviations
- ISO 4: Appl. Opt.

Indexing
- CODEN: APOPAI
- ISSN: 1559-128X (print); 2155-3165 (web)
- LCCN: 2004252118
- OCLC no.: 01481728

Links
- Journal homepage; Online access; Online archive

Applied Optics is a peer-reviewed scientific journal published by Optica three times a month. It was established in 1962 with John N. Howard as founding editor-in-chief and Patricia Wakeling as managing editor. Wakeling worked on the journal for over three decades. The editor-in-chief is Gisele Bennett. The journal covers all aspects of optics, photonics, imaging, and sensing. According to the Journal Citation Reports, the journal has a 2023 impact factor of 1.7.
