= Gisele Bennett =

American professor of electrical engineering

- Citizenship: United States
- Education: University of Central Florida; Georgia Institute of Technology
- Scientific career
- Fields: Optics
- Workplaces: Georgia Tech Research Institute

Gisele Bennett was a professor at the Georgia Institute of Technology and the Director of the GTRI Electro-Optical Systems Laboratory at the Georgia Tech Research Institute (GTRI). She also founded the Logistics and Maintenance Applied Research Center (LandMARC) at GTRI.

== Education ==
Bennett holds a 1987 B.S. and a 1989 M.S. from the College of Optics and Photonics at the University of Central Florida and a 1995 Ph.D. from the Georgia Institute of Technology, all in electrical engineering.

== Career ==
After earning her Ph.D., Bennett began working at GTRI as a research scientist in 1996 and as a professor in the Georgia Tech School of Electrical and Computer Engineering in 1997. In 2000, she founded the Logistics and Maintenance Applied Research Center (LandMARC) and is currently its director. Bennett became the director of the GTRI Electro-Optical Systems Laboratory in 2005. In 2014, she was named an Optica fellow for 2015.

Bennett is a member of the Army Science Board. She is a Fellow at Optica and the International Society for Optics and Photonics (SPIE) and a Senior Member of the Institute of Electrical and Electronics Engineers (IEEE). She has held officer positions at Optica and IEEE and serves in a variety of professional activities involving optical engineering research. She has been a topical editor and has served as a feature editor for Applied Optics and is a visiting lecturer for SPIE and Optica.

Bennett has served as a research proposal reviewer for the National Institute of Health and National Science Foundation and a reviewer for numerous referred journals. She is one of the first 10 Fellows chosen for Georgia Tech’s University Leadership program. In 2017, she won the Progress and Service Award for Sustained Impact in Administration from the Georgia Tech Research Corporation.

In January 2021, she became Editor-in-Chief of Applied Optics.

== Awards and honors ==
- 2015, Fellow, Optica - For technical innovation in the use of optical imaging and for research leadership.
- 2015, Fellow, International Society for Optics and Photonics (SPIE)
