= Economic patriotism =

Economic policy

Economic patriotism, also referred to as New Economic Patriotism, is a term used to describe the practice of making economic decisions that prioritize certain groups, businesses, or industries based on their regional status. It involves favoring the interests of a specific region over personal interests, and implies a moral obligation to the community that supersedes obligations to those outside of it. Economic patriotism can encompass different geographical areas and can involve transfers between various levels of economic affinity.

Economic patriotism is not limited to protectionism and can include a variety of policy approaches, from protectionist measures to market opening strategies. Unlike economic nationalism, economic patriotism emphasizes supporting and promoting one's own region's economy without abandoning strategic trade or foreign direct investment and without severely restricting immigration.

Into the 2020s, the concept of New Economic Patriotism has gained traction, emphasizing the importance of a nation's productive capabilities for its security, stability, and overall well-being. New Economic Patriotism promotes the idea that nations can build sustainable and inclusive economies without engaging in zero-sum competition or disfavoring other countries' development. Its strategy involves prioritizing domestic production, and investing in diverse industries and regions.

== Overview ==
=== Ben Clift and Cornelia Woll ===
Economic patriotism, as defined by Ben Clift and Cornelia Woll, refers to making economic decisions that give priority to certain groups, businesses, or industries based on their regional status. It entails a form of partiality in economic matters, where the interests of a specific region are given greater consideration than personal interests. Economic patriotism implies that people have a moral obligation to their community that surpasses their responsibilities to those outside of it. It is not limited to protectionism and can encompass various geographical areas, from local to national and regional. Economic patriotism encompasses a wider scope than economic nationalism and is flexible in its definition of the unit of allegiance. It also involves transfers between various levels of economic affinity, including the supranational and subnational levels. Economic patriotism can encompass a variety of policy approaches, from protectionist measures to market opening strategies. Policymakers play a crucial role in providing incentives for growth and supporting favorable competition policies.

In the context of financial control over industrial groups, the concept of economic patriotism has emerged as a means of safeguarding a country's vital economic interests; however, the regional or sometimes multinational nature of these groups makes it challenging to establish a direct link with a specific state. This poses a problem when attempting to apply the principle of economic patriotism to these entities. Despite this, calls for economic patriotism persist due to the perceived threat to a country's economic interests. In particular, the sensitivity of the energy sector has highlighted the need for collective action at a regional level. Issues with Russian gas exports have served as a reminder that European interests and vulnerabilities extend beyond national borders.

=== New Economic Patriotism ===
US Representative Ro Khanna has advocated for a New Economic Patriotism plan to restore American manufacturing and technology leadership, and to respect workers who will help achieve that goal. Policy advocate Robert C. Hockett highlights the significance of rebalancing trade relations as a crucial part of New Economic Patriotism. He emphasizes that pride in the country involves recognizing the potential and creative powers of its people, and advocates for policies that provide free or affordable education, medical access, childcare, housing, food, and job and retirement security for all citizens.

== Examples ==
During her 2020 presidential campaign, US Senator Elizabeth Warren's proposed economic patriotism policy aimed to support American workers through the implementation of government policies and interventions. This includes the creation of a new government agency, the Department of Economic Development, to consolidate job creation programs. The policy also includes measures such as managing currency value to boost exports, increasing federal R&D investments possibly with conditions for domestic production, boosting export promotion, leveraging the purchasing power of the federal government to create markets for American-made products, and restructuring worker training programs. Warren's goal for this economic patriotism is to provide American workers and industries the best opportunity to compete globally, while primarily investing in American workers rather than diminishing competitors.

Economic patriotism was a concept championed by Barack Obama during his time in office. According to Obama, his economic patriotism was rooted in the idea that a thriving middle class was crucial for the growth of the economy. He had a comprehensive plan to achieve this, which included a number of initiatives aimed at strengthening middle-class security. Some of the key components of his plan included reforming the corporate tax code, ending tax deductions for companies that ship jobs overseas, taking on unfair trade practices, investing in education and training for workers, and creating innovation institutes.

As an advocate for a New Economic Patriotism, Khanna asserts that the country's failed trade policies with China have led to the loss of millions of good-paying jobs and disproportionately harmed both urban Black and rural small city manufacturing workers. He argues that the federal government should partner with the private sector to finance upgrading factories in manufacturing regions with low or zero-interest loans. He encourages investing in the next generation of workers, and providing grants to support new manufacturing process innovation and productivity enhancements. The plan would also establish a National Economic Development Council to bring together different agency heads, economists, and business and education leaders to ensure that key components of supply chains are done in the US or cooperating partners. Khanna argues that this plan is not just about creating jobs but also unifying regions of Americans with a renewed shared purpose.

Drutex, a Polish window manufacturing company, has demonstrated economic patriotism by not only distributing their products globally but also creating research programs, developing IT solutions, and employing Polish citizens. The company's activities generate significant benefits for Poland's economy, supporting other businesses and entire sectors while also contributing to the state budget as well as upholding the overall standard of Polish brands.

Ukrainian president Volodymyr Zelenskyy announced in February 2022 that he would take steps to improve the nation's defense readiness, which would entail implementing a bundle of new measures aimed at promoting economic patriotism and bolstering domestic industries. Among the measures were tax breaks and a stimulus program intended to encourage manufacturers and banks to stay in Ukraine and contribute to the country's financial growth.

== History ==
As a term, economic patriotism has been in use since earlier times to describe nationalist intervention by the state. Throughout American history, the phrase economic patriotism has acquired a new mostly opposite meaning. In 1985, the term was used by William Safire in defense of the Strategic Defense Initiative during Ronald Reagan's time in office, and it was described as being proud of military investment. In 1992, former Massachusetts senator Paul Tsongas promoted economic patriotism by advocating the purchase of American products. In 2012, the phrase made a comeback in the context of the reelection campaign of Obama, who used it to promote policies focused on middle class jobs, education and training, growing small businesses, and innovation.

== Criticism ==
Some critics argue that economic patriotism promotes protectionist policies. Cliff and Woll acknowledge that economic patriotism can be a controversial concept, as it may lead to protectionist policies that harm international trade and cooperation. They argue that economic patriotism should be balanced with a recognition of the benefits of global economic integration, and that policies should be designed to promote both regional economic interests and international cooperation and market development.

American conservatives, such as Kevin D. Williamson, commented that the concept of economic patriotism has been promoted by the Democratic Party in the United States. In his view, it lacks any substantial intellectual content. Williamson suggests that Democrats use the term to criticize companies that legally relocate to tax-friendly countries while disregarding the fact that Democrats themselves have inserted special breaks and carve-outs into the tax code as incentives not to relocate. Additionally, he pointed to what he describes as outdated similarities between the economic philosophy of Democrats and the idea of economic nationalism, which he says has a troubling history associated with fascist rhetoric. Ultimately, he argues that economic patriotism appears to be more about serving the interests of the Obama administration and its congressional allies rather than doing what is best for the country, while others argue it is about both of these.

French business leaders have criticized the government's policy of economic patriotism, which they typically interpret as a strategy to discourage unwanted acquisition attempts by foreign investors of essential French companies instead of encouraging cooperation. They argue that the policy is both protectionist and ineffective and has damaged France's image in the eyes of the world. The policy gained prominence after the government reacted strongly to rumors of a takeover bid for Danone by PepsiCo and following interest from Enel in acquiring Suez, leading to plans to merge Gaz de France with Suez. The then prime minister Dominique de Villepin defended the policy, stating that all governments take steps to defend their countries' economic interests. In 2007, Alistair Darling, the new Chancellor of the Exchequer in Britain, criticized the then French president Nicolas Sarkozy's policy of nurturing national industrial champions, which he referred to as economic patriotism. Darling argued that such policies were protectionist in nature and would harm free trade. French officials defended their policy and dismissed concerns about its impact on the European Union's budget targets. They argued that the tax cuts introduced as part of the economic patriotism incentive would help improve France's competitive position while still adhering to their European obligations.

== See also ==
- Domestic sourcing
- Economic interventionism
- Economic progressivism
- State capitalism
- Economic nationalism
