= Optics and Spectroscopy =

Journal

- Discipline: Optical science, optical engineering
- Language: English
- Edited by: Nikolay N. Rosanov

Publication details
- History: 1956–present
- Publisher: Springer Science+Business Media
- Frequency: Monthly
- Open access: Hybrid
- Impact factor: 0.9 (2024)

Standard abbreviations
- ISO 4: Opt. Spectrosc.

Indexing
- ISSN: 0030-400X (print); 1562-6911 (web)

Links
- Journal homepage

Optics and Spectroscopy is a monthly peer-reviewed scientific journal. It is the English version of the Russian journal Оптика и спектроскопия (Optika i Spektroskopiya) that was established in 1956. The journal was aided in development by Patricia Wakeling through a grant to her from the National Science Foundation. It covers research on spectroscopy of electromagnetic waves, from radio waves to X-rays, and related topics in optics, including quantum optics.

== Abstracting and indexing ==
The journal is abstracted and indexed in:

- Chemical Abstracts Service
- Current Contents/Electronics & Telecommunications Collection
- Current Contents/Physical, Chemical & Earth Sciences
- EBSCO databases
- Ei Compendex
- Inspec
- ProQuest databases
- Science Citation Index Expanded
- Scopus

According to the Journal Citation Reports, the journal has a 2024 impact factor of 0.9.
