= Pergamon Press =

British publishing house

- Parent company: Elsevier
- Founded: 1948; 78 years ago
- Founders: Robert Maxwell, Paul Rosbaud
- Country of origin: United Kingdom
- Headquarters location: Oxford
- Nonfiction topics: Science and Medicine

Pergamon Press was an Oxford-based publishing house, founded by Paul Rosbaud and Robert Maxwell, that published scientific and medical books and journals. Originally called Butterworth-Springer, it is now an imprint of Elsevier.

== History ==
The core company, Butterworth-Springer, started in 1948 to bring the "Springer know-how and techniques of aggressive publishing in science" to Britain. Paul Rosbaud was the man with the knowledge. When Maxwell acquired the company in 1951, Rosbaud held a one-quarter share. They changed the house name to Pergamon Press, using a logo that was a reproduction of a Greek coin from Pergamon. Maxwell and Rosbaud worked together growing the company until May 1956, when, according to Joe Haines, Rosbaud was sacked.

When Pergamon Press started it had only six serials and two books. Initially the company headquarters was in Fitzroy Square in West End of London. In 1959, the company moved into Headington Hill Hall, a country home rented from the city of Oxford.

In 1960, Brian Cox joined Pergamon Press as subscription manager. After the founders' deaths, Cox has become the primary witness to the steep rise of Pergamon Press in the Science, Technology, and Medicine (STM) sector of publishing. The 59 Pergamon academic journals in 1960 became 418 journals in 1992. Cox recalls that in the process some 700 were launched, many transmogrifying rather than ceasing. Cox says "The secret of Pergamon's success was to publish a large number of journals, so that the established titles could support the new ones during their formative years".

In 1962, Pergamon Press started the series called The Commonwealth and International Library of Sciences, Technology, Engineering, and Liberal Studies. By 1970, this series had 1000 titles. Brian Cox says that in all, Pergamon published 7,000 monographs for various authors.

In 1964, Pergamon Press became a public company. With its growth and export performance, the company was a recipient of one of the Queen's Awards for Enterprise in 1966. That year saw construction of a new office block and warehouse at Headington Hill. Pergamon ventured to produce an Encyclopaedic Dictionary of Physics, in nine volumes and four supplements in the decade from 1961.

In 1969, Maxwell lost control of Pergamon and was ejected from the board. An inquiry by the Department of Trade and Industry (DTI) under the Takeover Code of the time reported in mid-1971: "We regret having to conclude that, notwithstanding Mr Maxwell's acknowledged abilities and energy, he is not in our opinion a person who can be relied on to exercise proper stewardship of a publicly quoted company." It was found that Maxwell had contrived to maximise Pergamon's share price through transactions between his private family companies. Maxwell reacquired Pergamon in 1974 after borrowing funds.

Pergamon continued with International Encyclopedias in biotechnology, chemistry, education, engineering, entomology, linguistics, materials science, and pharmacology and toxicology. The education volume won the Dartmouth Medal from the American Library Association in 1986 as the best reference work of the year.

Pergamon also has offices in Elmsford, New York, in the United States.

Pergamon is the publisher of several works of the Club of Rome, such as Beyond the Age of Waste, Energy, the Countdown, No Limits to Learning, Towards more Effective Societies, Dialogue of Wealth and Welfare and Microelectronics and Society.

== Business approach ==
In 2017 Stephen Buranyi described Maxwell's approach in the Guardian:

Maxwell insisted on grand titles – "International Journal of" was a favourite prefix. Peter Ashby, a former vice president at Pergamon, described this to me as a "PR trick", but it also reflected a deep understanding of how science, and society's attitude to science, had changed. Collaborating and getting your work seen on the international stage was becoming a new form of prestige for researchers, and in many cases Maxwell had the market cornered before anyone else realised it existed.

The consequences of Pergamon Press business strategies during this period has been described by Mark W. Neff in the academic journal Issues in Science and Technology:

Between 1959 and 1965, Pergamon grew from 40 titles to 150. Whereas scientific norms at the time viewed scientific publishing as a public good that should not be subject to profit motives, Maxwell understood that scientific publishing was a market unlike others because there was an almost ceaseless growth of demand, and free labour. Scientists would pressure their institutional libraries to secure access to any serious journal publishing work relevant to their own.

== Sale to Elsevier ==
Maxwell sold Pergamon Press to academic publishing giant Elsevier in March 1991 for £440 million; the funds were used to repay the large debt taken on by Maxwell in taking control of New York Daily News.

Maxwell retained Pergamon's US books (which became part of sister company Macmillan Inc.), the Chess and Bridge magazines, and some smaller properties. The imprint "Pergamon Press" continues to be used to identify journals now published by Elsevier.

== See also ==
- Verlag Harri Deutsch
- Patricia Wakeling
