= John Howard (optical physicist) =

- Born: John Nelson Howard; February 27, 1921; Philadelphia, Pennsylvania
- Died: April 15, 2015 (aged 94); Newton, Massachusetts
- Citizenship: USA
- Known for: Founder of Applied Optics
- Scientific career
- Fields: Physics; Optics
- Institutions: Air Force Geophysics Laboratory

John Nelson Howard (February 27, 1921 – April 15, 2015) was president of the Optical Society of America in 1991. He was the founding editor of the scientific journal Applied Optics. Howard was also a chief scientist of the Air Force Geophysics Laboratory.

He was a Fellow of the Optical Society and received the OSA Distinguished Service Award in 1987.

In his later years he was a contributing editor to Optics and Photonics News (OPN).

== See also ==
- Optical Society of America#Past Presidents of the OSA
