= Economic nationalism =

Ideology that favors state intervention to protect the domestic economy

Economic nationalism or nationalist economics is an ideology that prioritizes state intervention in the economy, including policies like domestic control and the use of tariffs and restrictions on labor, goods, and capital movement. The core belief of economic nationalism is that the economy should serve nationalist goals. As a prominent modern ideology, economic nationalism stands in contrast to economic liberalism and economic socialism.

Economic nationalists oppose globalization and some question the benefits of unrestricted free trade. They favor protectionism and advocate for self-sufficiency. To economic nationalists, markets are to be subordinate to the state, and should serve the interests of the state (such as providing national security and accumulating military power). The doctrine of mercantilism is a prominent variant of economic nationalism. Economic nationalists tend to see international trade as zero-sum, where the goal is to derive relative gains (as opposed to mutual gains).

Economic nationalism tends to emphasize industrialization (and often aids industries with state support), due to beliefs that industry has positive spillover effects on the rest of the economy, enhances the self-sufficiency and political autonomy of the country, and is a crucial aspect in building military power.

== History ==
While the coining of the term "economic patriotism" has been attributed to French parliamentarian Bernard Carayon, there is evidence that the phrase has been in use since earlier times to describe nationalist intervention by the state. In an early instance of its use, speechwriter William Safire in 1985, in defending President Reagan's proposal of the national Strategic Defense Initiative missile defense system, wrote, "Our common denominator is nationalism – both a military and economic patriotism – which inclines us to the side of pervasive national defense."

In the mid-to-late 1800s, Italian economic thinkers began to gravitate towards the theories of Friedrich List. Led by Italian economists like Alessandro Rossi, policies favoring nationalist protectionism of industries gained momentum. The Italian government had previously been ignoring Italian industry in favor of trade with France, and it seemed content to watch other European powers modernize and gain influence through their colonies. Various groups began to put pressure on the Italian government, from textile to ceramic manufacturers, and although the Italian government imposed tariffs the industrialists felt that it was not enough. The push for economic nationalism with industrialization and protectionism quickly spun Italy into an economic crisis in 1887, exposing Italian industrial woes.

The Austro-Hungarian empire’s ethnic diversity made it an unusual case of the rise of European nationalism. The fall of the Austro-Hungarian Empire, while mostly caused by the empire's defeat in World War I, was also caused by the lack of economic and political integration between Austrians and Slavs. Though Hungary relied on Austria economically, as it provided a market for Hungary's agriculture production, there was a deep social and economic rift between the Austrians and Slavic people, who actively boycotted and protested Austrian rule in favor of more autonomy in the Balkans. Regions within the empire began using forms of price discrimination to strengthen national economies. As a result, intra-empire trade began to fail. Grain prices fluctuated throughout the empire after the 1880s into World War I, however an ethnic breakdown of the empire showed that grain trade between two predominantly Austrian territories, or two predominantly Slavic territories, led to a gradual decrease in grain prices from the 1870s up to World War I. This was mainly due to the increased presence of railroads in the late 1800s. The only trade pairing that did not observe decreasing grain prices was two territories of varying nationality. Overall, grain prices were cheaper, and the price gap was smaller, when the two territories trading more closely resembled each other ethnically and linguistically.

At an economic summit in September 1974, one topic of discussion was the gradual dissolution of economic barriers to the movement of goods, people and services across borders in the post World War II era. According to William E. Simon, who was United States Treasury Secretary at that time, there was concern that inflation would motivate economic nationalism: "This has had enormously beneficial effect; Now, however, there is some danger that inflation may drive countries in economic nationalism."

== Philosophy ==
The philosophical foundations of economic nationalism are difficult to trace due to the ideology's lengthy history and its unique appeal to different types of groups. The four general pillars come from its political, cultural, economic, and social roots. Though details surrounding these four pillars may differ depending on a nation's status, generally a nation's own status and economic stability takes precedence over another. During the late-19th and early-20th century this meant an emphasis on protectionism, increased role of the government, and even colonialism, as it was a means of modifying an occupied country's culture and creed.

In both Germany and Italy, Friedrich List played an influential role in the rise in economic nationalism during the 1800s. List brought elements of economic theory and national identity together, as he postulated that an individual's quality of life was in correlation with the success of their country and was a well-known proponent of tariffs in the United States. List's ideas on economics and nationalism directly challenged the economic theories of Adam Smith, as List felt that Smith reduced the role of national identity too much and favored of a globalized approach which ignored certain complexities of political life.

== Modern examples ==
As a policy is a deliberate system of principles to guide decisions and achieve rational outcomes, the following list of would be examples of an economic nationalistic policy, where there is consistent and rational doctrine associated with each individual protectionist measure:

- Proposed takeover of Arcelor (Spain, France and Luxembourg) by Mittal Steel Company (India)
- French governmental listing of Danone (France) as a 'strategic industry' to pre-empt a potential takeover bid by PepsiCo (USA)
- Blocked takeover of Autostrade, an Italian toll-road operator by the Spanish company Abertis
- Proposed takeover of Endesa (Spain) by E.ON (Germany), and the counter-bid by Gas Natural (Spain)
- Proposed takeover of Suez (France) by Enel (Italy), and the counter-bid by Gaz de France (France)
- United States Congressional opposition to the takeover bid for Unocal (USA) by CNOOC (PR China), and the subsequent takeover by Chevron (USA)
- Political opposition in 2006 to sell port management businesses in six major U.S. seaports to Dubai Ports World based in the United Arab Emirates
- Limits on foreign participation and ownership in Russia's natural resource sectors and selected Russian industries, beginning in 2008

The reason for a policy of economic protectionism in the cases above varied from bid to bid. In the case of Mittal's bid for Arcelor, the primary concerns involved job security for the Arcelor employees based in France and Luxembourg. The cases of French Suez and Spanish Endesa involved the desire for respective European governments to create a 'national champion' capable of competing at both a European and global level. Both the French and US government used national security as the reason for opposing takeovers of Danone, Unocal, and the bid by DP World for 6 US ports. In none of the examples given above was the original bid deemed to be against the interests of competition. In many cases the shareholders supported the foreign bid. For instance in France after the bid for Suez by Enel was counteracted by the French public energy and gas company Gaz De France the shareholders of Suez complained and the unions of Gaz De France were in an uproar because of the privatization of their jobs.

The modern phenomenon of the European Union has in part led to a recent resurgence of economic nationalism. Western Europe as a whole has become more economically globalized since the end of World War II, embracing economic integration and introducing the euro. This did lead to positive economic impacts, such as steady wage increases. However, from the 1990s through the Great Recession, there has been an increasing distrust in this globalized system. With rising income inequalities and little protection against natural economic occurrences, many Europeans have begun to embrace economic nationalism. This is because modern European nationalists see their nation's economy becoming generally more globalized at the expense of one's own economic status. Globalization, like the type one can observe in the European Union, is easy to oppose as it creates winners and losers. Those who lose their jobs due to globalization are more likely to be drawn to parties espousing economic nationalism.

Although some European nations were impacted differently, nations that saw an increased exposure to the China trade shock did move significantly further right politically and generally supported more nationalist and protectionist policies. Even industries which did not see increased exposure to the China trade shock generally shifted towards right wing policies. This shows that, while some voters shifted their political support due to their worsening economic conditions, many voters shifted to right-wing policy due to a community-wide reaction from the China trade shock. Although the shock took place in the 1980s, its economic effects still impact the European electorate today. In particular, the Brexit vote showed the impact this shock had on the electorate, as regions which were most impacted by the China trade shock were still economically weak (in terms of GDP per capita) in comparison to other regions like London, even over a decade later. There is a strong positive correlation in regions most impacted by the China trade shock and an increase in votes to leave the European Union.

Immigration plays a large part in the policy of modern economic nationalists. With a considerable influx of immigration, particularly from parts of eastern Europe and the Middle East, those who gravitate towards economic nationalism find that their national identity and culture has been diluted by increased immigration. Although studies have shown marginal improvements to both native employment and wages when put in competition with immigrants.

The impact of Europe's move towards a globalized economy has led to the passing of nationalist policies and the support of right-wing populist parties, which generally espouse nationalist and socially conservative views, although there was also a growth in support for left-wing populist parties, such as Podemos in Spain and Syriza in Greece. Such parties have formed governments in a number of European countries, including Poland (Law and Justice), Hungary (Fidesz), and, arguably, the United Kingdom, where the Conservative Party, headed by PM Boris Johnson, has absorbed the vast majority of UKIP's support since Brexit. This is a prominent example of the rise in nationalism and anti-globalization, as Brexit, a result of lengthy campaigns by UKIP and the Eurosceptic faction of the Conservatives for a national referendum, is regarded by many opponents as a manifestation of economic (and social) nationalism, and right-wing populism more broadly. However, the majority of UK opinion polls since Brexit in have shown support for rejoining the EU, or ceasing the Brexit process during the period 2016-2020, in part likely due to the economic impacts of the deal agreed by the EU and UK.

== Criticism ==
One critical view of economic nationalism is that of Harry Binswanger, an American professor and Objectivist author. Writing for Capitalism Magazine, he argued that consumer preference for local goods gives local producers monopoly power, affording them the ability to lift prices to extract greater profits, and firms that produce locally produced goods can charge a premium for that good. He concluded that consumers who favor products by local producers may end up being exploited by profit-maximizing local producers, and that locally produced goods can attract a premium if consumers show a preference towards it, so firms have an incentive to pass foreign goods off as local goods if foreign goods have cheaper costs of production than local goods. In one example provided by Daniel J. Ikenson for the American libertarian think tank Cato Institute, a protectionist policy in the United States placed tariffs on foreign cars, giving local producers (Ford and GM market) market power that allowed them to raise the price of cars, which he said negatively affected American consumers who faced fewer choices and higher prices. An old criticism of economic nationalism dating back to the late 1920s is that of American social scientist Raymond Leslie Buell, who argued that it contributed to competition and warfare between states as they were motivated to annex territory containing resources, markets and seaports.

== See also ==
- Alter-globalization
- Anti-globalization movement
- Autarky
- Developmentalism
- Domestic sourcing
- Economic patriotism
- Nationalization
- Protectionism
- War economy
- Gold repatriation
