= Domestic sourcing =

Buying locally made goods or services

Domestic sourcing is the activity of contracting for goods or services that are delivered or manufactured within the buyer's home country's borders.

== Advantages of domestic sourcing ==
=== Fast delivery ===
Domestic sources are usually closer to the distributor or retailer than 'imported sources'. Sources like raw materials, services or products can be delivered in shorter periods of time compared to foreign sources. After sales, exchange or refunds of faulty products will benefit as well; as it is always easier to communicate with local business rather than international cooperations. Further, there is also quicker reaction to emergency situations or faster decision making to uncertainties in the market.

=== Consumer confidence ===
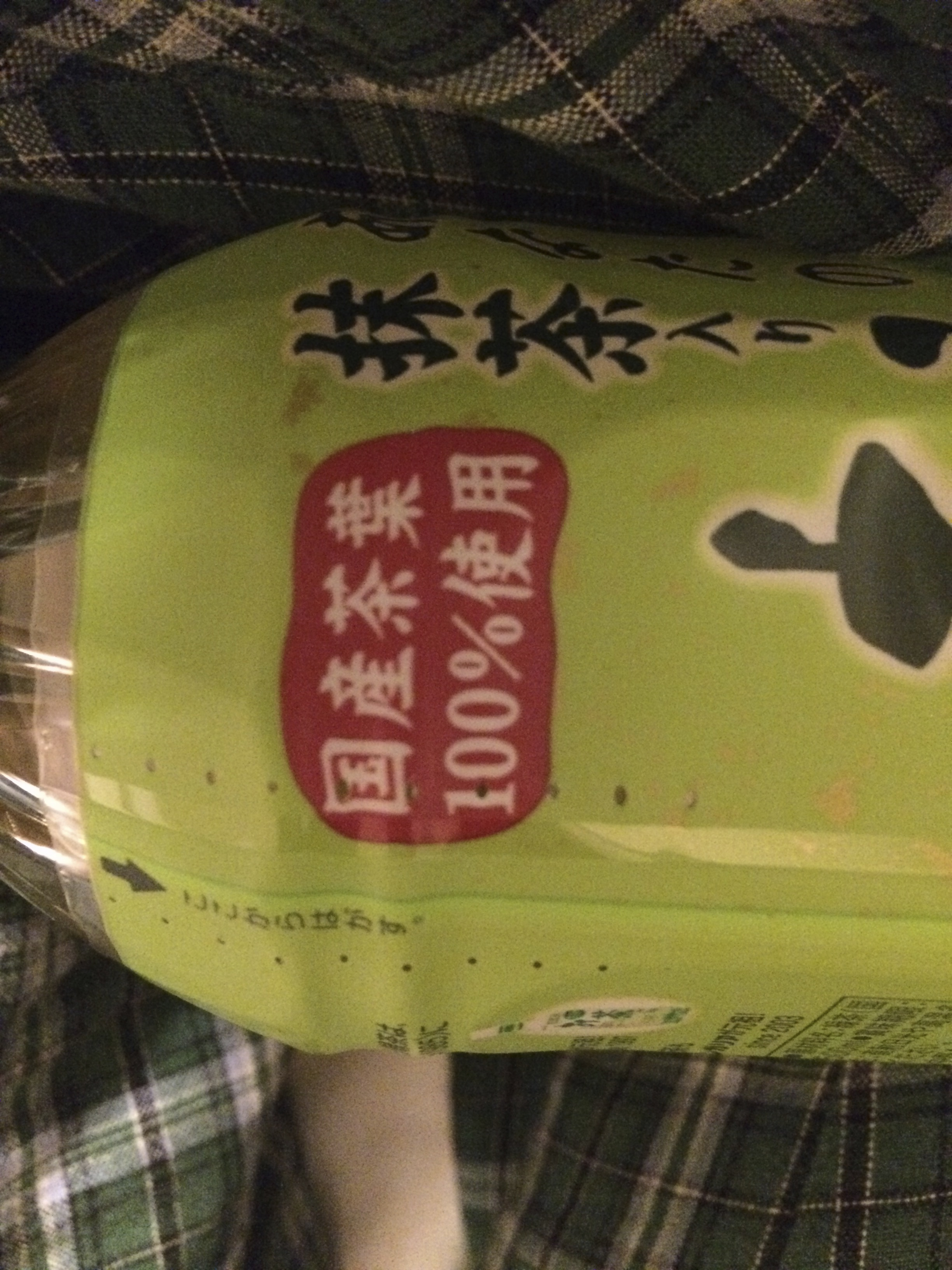
Japanese green tea bottle label identifying the tea as having been grown in Japan

Shorter time for transportation could ensure that products such as food and drinks stay fresh. It is statistically proven that domestic sourcing increases consumer confidence; according to a report by IGD, 57% of consumer who consider buying local food because it is fresher. It may also influence a consumer's decision when it comes to multiple options; with a domestic sourcing strategy, selling local products can help to gain support from consumers who are concerned about the origin of the product that they are buying for political, ethical, or environmental reasons. It is also persuasive to tell consumers that local products are quality assured; buying with confidence is a very important aspect for retailers to gain trust from consumers, subsequently increasing brand awareness and loyalty.

=== Cost benefit ===
Business or retailers who have strong relationships with local suppliers do not have to go through a long supply chain which will help to reduce the cost of sales, resulting in attracting more consumers with a lower selling price. Less transportation between the supplier and retailer may also reduce the selling price as transportation costs are cut.

=== Job opportunities ===
Increases in domestic sourcing rather than international sourcing will increase the job opportunities for locals. If all local business supports domestic sourcing, and the demand for domestic sourcing will increase, more job opportunities is then created to meet the new demands.

=== Benefits to the local economy ===
According to IGD report, over 54% of consumers buy local food as they feel obliged to support local producers and farmers in 2006. An increase in domestic sourcing for the labour force would benefit the economy of the state or country by increasing the circular flow of income; it is estimated that every £10 spent on local product is worth a £25 increase in the circular flow of income of the local economy. When there is an increase in demand for domestic sourcing, local suppliers have to hire more people to meet the boost in the demand, these new workforces will spend more money in the local economy which will thereafter produce a positive multiplier effect. Further, local business tend to give more wages than most corporate chains, which means that employees will receive more disposable income.

=== Protecting local culture ===
There are many local business selling unique products or services such as handcrafting or tailored products that nowhere else can offer; supporting domestic sourcing could prevent large corporate chains taking over the high street, preventing small business from being eliminated. Domestic sourcing also encourages more entrepreneurs to start small businesses in local markets.

=== Time zone advantage ===
Many reputable engineers claim that sourcing within the time zone creates many advantages. These include often speaking the same language and decreased travel costs.

== 'Buy British' campaigns ==
=== 'I'm backing Britain' ===
I'm backing Britain is one of the most famous Buy British campaigns, dating back to the late 1960s; it was triggered by five secretaries who volunteered to work an extra half an hour a day to show their contribution to the economy. With the approval from the government, as well as support from the mainstream media, it became a patriotic campaign in an attempt to boost the economy at that time. However, a few months later, with no sign of any boom in the economy; enthusiasm soon died down in the country, yet it still remains an iconic example of 'Buy British' campaigning.

=== John Lewis's £72m Buy British campaign ===
John Lewis launched a Buy British campaign in 2013, with £72 million more business with UK supplier, there is also significant growth in John lewis's Uk supplier from 132 to 207 firms in 2012 to 2013. The campaign encourage and brings back more British manufactured business.

== Buy Australian campaigns ==
The "buy west eat best" logo

Buy West Eat Best is a campaign that was developed by the Department of Agriculture and Food (Western Australia) to promote the sale of West Australian grown food produce.

Commencing in May 2008, all retailers in the state were invited to join the campaign, with the Woolworths and Coles conglomerates supporting the initiative.

== Buy American campaign ==
=== Walmart's Buy American campaign ===
Walmart's Buy American campaign plan to create 100,000 jobs and $50 billion sourcing in 10 years to support domestic sourcing in American, not only it help to boost the US economy as well as building and improving Walmart's public images and brand awareness. Made in American could also reduce the transportation and inventory cost for Walmart, hence a lower sell price could benefit consumer at same time.

=== I make America ===
I make America is launched by Association of Equipment Manufacturers to support Domestic manufacturing in US as well as to promote US exports.

== Disadvantage of domestic sourcing ==
=== Trade war / price war ===
Domestic sourcing campaign may trigger trade war globally. When one country starts to encourage their citizens to buy domestic goods, there are usually resistances from other countries. As result of that, poorer countries with significant disadvantage may be forced to add levy against a certain country. The most recent example of trade war happened in 2013 when EU claimed that China is selling solar panels below the average cost which resulted in lesser demand for solar panels made in Europe, which then led to trade war between China and EU.

=== Import ===
Certain domestic goods can be very expensive compared to other countries, so business that attempt to sell locally can find sales hurting if demand for such products are low.

=== Export ===
Export firms who chose to use more expensive domestic resources may lose their competitiveness in the global market due to higher cost of production, oversea demand will shrink eventually and with a consequence of a negative balance of trade and affect national GDP (Consumption + Investment + Government spending + (Export – Import))

== See also ==
- Economic nationalism
- Economic patriotism
- Offshoring
- Outsourcing
