= International Commission for Optics =

Organization

- Founded: 1947; 79 years ago
- Type: International non-governmental organization
- Purpose: Optics and photonics
- Location: Institute d'Optique, France
- Origins: Founded by optical scientists in 1947 under the leadership of Pierre Fleury
- Region served: Worldwide
- Method: Conferences, newsletter, reports
- Members: 52 Territorial Committees
- Key people: Roberta Ramponi (President), Angela M. Guzman (Secretary), Yasuhiko Arakawa (Past President), Duncan T. Moore (Past President), Jim Harrington (Treasurer), Gert von Bally (Associate Secretary)
- Website: e-ico.org

The International Commission for Optics (ICO) was created in 1947 with the objective to contribute, on an international basis, to the progress and dissemination of the science of optics and photonics and their applications. It emphasises the unity of the crossdisciplinary field of optics.

Optics and photonics are defined as the fields of science and engineering encompassing the physical phenomena and technologies associated with the generation, transmission, manipulation, detection, and use of light. It extends on both sides of the visible part of the electromagnetic spectrum as far as the same concepts apply.

In particular, the ICO promotes international cooperation and facilitates the rapid exchange of information, by encouraging and furthering the organisation, on an international basis, of scientific meetings and summer schools. It emphasises actions for the education and training in optics and photonics internationally. It undertakes special actions for the development of optics and photonics in regions where particular support is needed. It strives to improve the recognition of optics and photonics as fields of science with a significant impact on economy. It works also for the promotion of international agreements on nomenclature, units, symbols and standards.

It is a Scientific Associate of the International Council for Science (ICSU) and Affiliated Commission of the International Union of Pure and Applied Physics (IUPAP).

Among the activities of ICO are the organization and sponsorship of congresses, meetings and schools, and the awarding of prizes to distinguished scientists in optics and photonics. It has a Traveling Lecturer Program, and publishes quarterly the ICO Newsletter, the triennial book series International trends in optics and a Triennial Report.

== Mission ==
The mission of the International Commission for Optics is to contribute, on an international basis, to the progress and diffusion of knowledge in the fields of optics and photonics.

== History ==
The history of the ICO covers its initial years (1946-1948).

=== The birth of ICO: Reunions d'Opticiens, Paris, France, 1946 ===
In 1946 Europe was at last beginning to recover from the ordeal of World War II. The oldest and largest optics group in Europe was the Institut d'Optique in Paris, which had been founded in 1921 by the distinguished optical physicist Charles Fabry (1867–1945), and the director of the Institut d'Optique, Prof. Pierre Fleury, who had succeeded Fabry in 1945, was eager to resume an active role in European optics. He wrote to his optics colleagues and former students throughout Europe and invited them to participate in a Reunions d'Opticiens in Paris 14–19 October 1946. Scientists from 16 different countries participated in this first post-war European optics conference. The invited papers were by Frank Twyman (of Hilger and Watts) on the production of aspherical surfaces; Louis de Broglie on image formation, Jean Cabannes on the development of optics in France, and Pierre Fleury reviewed the history of the Institut d'Optique and research pursued since 1940. Then followed several days of contributed papers from most of the European optics groups. Many of the participants urged Fleury to seek some mechanism for continued cooperation in the optics community.

Pierre Fleury was already a French representative to IUPAP (the International Union of Pure and Applied Physics), with headquarters in Paris, and he was aware that the statutes of IUPAP provided for the creation of commissions in specific areas of physics; why not a commission for optics? He also determined that UNESCO (the United Nations Educational, Scientific, and Cultural Organization, with headquarters in Paris) would also be able to provide -through IUPAP- some funds for travel to a Preparatory Meeting in Prague to discuss the formation of an International Commission for Optics.

=== The ICO Preparatory Meeting, Prague, Czechoslovakia, 1947 ===
In January 1947 the General Assembly of IUPAP approved the appointment of a Preparatory Committee, with Prof. Pierre Fleury as Secretary, to consider forming an International Commission for Optics. The preparatory committee met in Prague, Czechoslovakia, 2–7 June 1947, with Prof Josef Hrdlicka as host. Fifteen delegates attended, representing eight countries, (Belgium, Czechoslovakia, France, Great Britain, Italy, the Netherlands, Poland, and Sweden). Replies were received from five other countries (Denmark, Finland, Norway, Switzerland, and the USA) that their representatives would be unable to attend, and Argentina and the USSR did not respond.

The attendees agreed that an International Commission for Optics should be formed as a self-governing affiliated commission of IUPAP. Each member country would form a national committee for ICO, which would select that country's representative to the ICO Bureau meetings. A set of provisional Statutes was adopted (patterned after the Statutes of IUPAP), and a provisional bureau was elected, (subject to approval by IUPAP and re-confirmation by the national committees at the first official meeting.) Thomas Smith of London was elected president; Pierre Fleury of Paris, secretary; Albert Arnulf of Paris, treasurer; and Josef Hrdlicka of Prague a vice-president, with two other vice-presidents to be selected at the first official meeting. The delegates decided to hold their first plenary session of ICO in conjunction with the next General Assembly of IUPAP in July 1948 in Amsterdam. (The Dutch delegate, Prof van Heel, invited the ICO to meet at his laboratory in Delft.)

The organizers also formulated the objectives of ICO: the study of optical theory, the theoretical study and construction of optical instruments, and the physiological optics of the eye. The organizers were grateful to both UNESCO and IUPAP for travel, secretarial and publication support during the initial organizational stage, but to ensure smooth functioning of ICO in 1948 and beyond it was decided to assess each member country for an annual contribution based on the same population scale used by IUPAP: countries with less than 5 million inhabitants, 1 unit; 5 to 10 million, 2 units; 10 to 15 million, 3 units; 15 to 20 million, 5 units; and greater than 20 million, 8 units.

As tasks to be accomplished in the near term by ICO, each national committee was asked to establish if possible a list of the names and addresses of its optics researchers and also a list of the manufacturers of optical instruments. Each country was also asked to supply a list of their optics publications for the war years 1939–1945.

As a further challenge to the new organization the delegates compiled a list of about 20 technical problem areas in optics. These subjects were assigned to various ICO national committees, with a request that each committee report on its problem at the 1948 meeting in the Netherlands. Most of the problem areas represented the special interests of the delegates present at the preparatory session, and this would provide a quick mechanism to ensure some technical content at the first formal meeting of ICO. Italy (Giuliano Toraldo di Francia) would survey diffraction theory; Great Britain (T. Smith) would survey aberration studies (without diffraction); and France (André Maréchal) and the Netherlands would report on the combined effect of aberrations and diffraction. Sweden (E. Ingelstam) would survey gratings; Great Britain, photographic objectives; and other groups were assigned other tasks. Finally, there would be reports on sign conventions, notation, tolerances and the specification of optical drawings.

In drawing up these assigned tasks the preparatory commission was following the usual format of a commission of a scientific union: stating specific problems to be reported on by the commission. In Prague the founding group had recognized the need for improved international cooperation in optics, had sketched a charter for ICO, and had planned a comprehensive program for the ICO initial meeting in 1948.

=== The First Congress, ICO-1, Delft, Netherlands, 1948 ===
The first official meeting of ICO took place 12–17 July 1948 at the Physics Laboratory of the Technische Hogeschool, Delft, Netherlands. Forty-four delegates from eleven countries attended the meetings. At the first session Prof Fleury announced that IUPAP had cordially accepted the affiliation of ICO and had approved the Statutes provisionally adopted at Prague. The appointment of officers elected in 1947 was confirmed, and two additional vice-presidents were elected: S.S. Ballard (USA) and A.C.S. van Heel (Netherlands). Thus the eleven countries represented at Delft became the founding member countries of the ICO; Belgium, Czechoslovakia, France, Great Britain, Italy, Netherlands, Poland, Spain, Sweden, Switzerland, and the United States.

In addition to the sessions devoted to reports on the problem areas that had been assigned at Prague, the participants heard four invited lectures: by M. Françon (France); T. Smith (Great Britain); D.B. Judd (USA); and A.C.S. van Heel (Netherlands). On the first day of the meeting Prof van Heel hosted a reception at his home, and on the last evening the group held a formal dinner. During the week there were several local visits to research laboratories: de Oude Delft; the Kammerlingh-Onnes Laboratory in Leiden; the Philips Research Labs at Eindhoven; van Cittert's collection of historical optical instruments at Utrecht; and the optics and electron optics laboratories of the Technische Hogeschool, Delft. This sort of mixing of technical reports and social activities is important in building a sense of community among the attendees.

The principal work at the meeting was the presentation of detailed reports on the topics that had been assigned at Prague. These reports occupied most of the six technical sessions. The delegates also agreed that ICO should not act as a vehicle for publishing original research papers. Full use should be made of existing scientific journals..The delegates agreed that one of the roles of ICO should be to sponsor conferences at which sets of invited papers are given on some specialized field or fields of optics.

At the final session President Thomas Smith announced that he had been authorized to invite the ICO to hold the next meeting in 1950 in London. This announcement was accepted by acclamation.

== The Congresses of the International Commission for Optics ==
The ICO Congresses are held every three years; they include a General Business Meeting as requested by the statutes and a Scientific Meeting that covers most of research topics in optics and photonics. Dates and locations of ICO Congresses:

- ICO-24, 2017, Japan
- ICO-23, 2014, Spain
- ICO-22, 2011, Mexico
- ICO-21, 2008, Australia
- ICO-20, 2005, People's Republic of China
- ICO-19, 2002, Italy
- ICO-18, 1999, United States of America
- ICO-17, 1996, Korea
- ICO-16, 1993, Hungary
- ICO-15, 1990, F.R. Germany
- ICO-14, 1987, Canada
- ICO-13, 1984, Japan
- ICO-12, 1981, Austria
- ICO-11, 1978, Spain
- ICO-10, 1975, Czechoslovakia
- ICO-9, 1972, United States of America
- ICO-8, 1969, United Kingdom
- ICO-7, 1966, France
- ICO-6, 1962, F.R. Germany
- ICO-5, 1959, Sweden
- ICO-4, 1956, United States of America
- ICO-3, 1953, Spain
- ICO-2, 1950, United Kingdom
- ICO-1, 1948, The Netherlands

(preliminary meetings had been held in Czechoslovakia and France).

== Structure ==
- The ICO General Assembly of all Members is the ruling body and is convened every three years during the ICO General Congress.
- The ICO Bureau conducts all ICO business between General Assemblies, and consists of:
  - Elected officers: ICO President, Past President, Secretary, Associate Secretary, Treasurer
  - 8 elected Vice presidents
  - 1 Vice presidents designed by each International Member Society
  - 1 IUPAP representative
- The ICO Executive Committee consists of the elected officers and advises the ICO Bureau in all decisions required for the day-to day operation between General Assemblies.
- The ICO Secretariat ensures the day-to-day planning and operations under the guidance of the elected Executive Committee.
- The ICO Associate Secretariat deals with requests for ICO endorsement and/or support to schools, meetings and conferences
- Committees: Committee for Regional Development of Optics, Education Committee, Traveling Lecturer Committee, Long Range Strategic Planning Committee and four Award Committees.

== Finances ==
The provenience of ICO financial resources are the contributions from its members.

== Members ==
Territorial Committees	Since	Units	Votes
Argentina	1981	2	2
Armenia	2011	1	1
Australia	1959	6	3
Belarus (A)	1993	2	2
Belgium (A)	1948	4	3
Brazil	1984	4	3
Canada	1956	8	4
Chinese Optical Society	1987	8	4
Colombia	1990	1	1
Cuba	1993	1	1
Czech Republic	1948	2	2
Denmark	1987	3	2
Ecuador (A)	2005		
Estonia	2002	1	1
Finland	1978	3	2
France	1948	15	5
Germany	1953	15	5
Ghana / West Africa (A)	1993	1	1
Greece	2005	1	1
Hungary (A)	1963	3	2
India	1990	4	3
Indonesia (A)	1987	1	1
Ireland	1984	1	1
Islamic Republic of Iran (A)	1993	1	1
Israel	1972	2	2
Italy	1948	12	5
Japan	1953	15	5

Territorial Committees	Since	Units	Votes
Korea (Republic of)	1975	3	2
Latvia	2002	1	1
Lithuania (A)	2003	1	1
Mexico	1972	2	2
Moldova (A)	2005	1	1
Morocco (A)	2002		
Netherlands (A)	1948	4	3
New Zealand	1974	1	1
Norway	1981	3	2
Optical Engineering Society; Taipei China (A)	1981	3	2
Poland	1948	4	3
Portugal	2011	1	1
Romania	1993	1	1
Russia	1981	18	6
Singapore	1984	1	1
Slovak Republic	1948	1	1
Spain	1948	4	3
Sudan	2008	1	1
Sweden	1948	8	4
Switzerland	1948	4	3
Tunisia	2006	1	1
Turkey (A)	1996	1	1
Ukraine	1993	1	1
United Kingdom	1948	12	5
United States of America	1948	18	6
Venezuela	1997	1	1

(A) Associate member

International Societies	Since	Units	Votes
African Laser, Atomic, Molecular and Optical Sciences Network (LAM Network)	2002	1	1
European Optical Society	1999	1	1
IEEE Photonics Society	2000	2	2
International Society on Optics Within Life Science (OWLS)	2000	1	1
The Optical Society	1999	5	3
Iberian American Network of Optics	2014	1	1
SPIE	2000	5	3

=== Observer ===
- The Quantum Electronics and Optics Division of the European Physical Society QEOD/EPS

== ICO presidents ==
- 2014–2017: Yasuhiko Arakawa, Center for Photonic and Electronic Convergence, Institute of Industrial Science, The University of Tokyo, Japan.
- 2011–2014: Duncan T. MOORE, The Institute of Optics, University of Rochester, USA.
- 2008–2011: Maria L. Calvo, Complutense University of Madrid (UCM), Department of Optics, Madrid, Spain.
- 2005–2008: Ari T. Friberg, University of Eastern Finland, Department of Physics and Mathematics, Joensuu, Finland.
- 2002–2005: René Dandliker, Institute of Microtechnology, University of Neuchâtel, Neuchâtel, Switzerland
- 1999–2002: Arthur H. Guenther, University of New Mexico, Albuquerque, New Mexico.
- 1996–1999: Toshimitsu Asakura, Faculty of Engineering, Hokkai-Gakuen University, Sapporo, Japan.
- 1993–1996: Anna Consortini, Dipartimento di Fisica, Università degli Studi, Firenze, Italy.
- 1990–1993: Christopher Dainty, Imperial College, London, UK
- 1987–1990: Joseph W. Goodman, School of Engineering, Stanford University, Stanford, USA.
- 1984–1981: Serge Lowenthal, Institut d’Optique, Faculté des Sciences, Orsay, France.
- 1981–1984: J. Tsujiuchi, Tokyo Institute of Technology, Tokyo, Japan.
- 1978–1981: Adolf W. Lohmann, University of Erlangen, Erlangen, Germany.
- 1975–1978: Kenneth M. Baird, Canadian National Research Council, Canada.
- 1972–1975: William H. Steel, CSIRO (Commonwealth Scientific and Industrial Research Organisation) National Standards Laboratory, Australia.
- 1969–1972: Harold H. Hopkins, Reading University, UK'
- 1966–1969: Giuliano Toraldo di Francia, Università degli Studi di Firenze, Italy.
- 1962–1966: André Maréchal, French Institut d’Optique, France.
- 1959–1962: Erik Ingelstam, KTH Royal Institute of Technology, Sweden.
- 1956–1959: S. S. Ballard, USA.
- 1950–1956: Abraham Cornelis Sebastiaan (Bram) van Heel, Technische Universiteit Delft, Netherlands.
- 1947–1950: Thomas Smith, UK.

== ICO Awards ==
=== ICO Prize ===
The ICO Prize was established in 1982 and is presented annually to a person who has made a noteworthy contribution to Optics before reaching the age of 40.

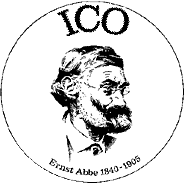
The ICO Medal

2013	Tobias Kippenberg	Switzerland
2012	Romain Quidant	Spain
2011	Nicholas X. Fang	USA
2010	Reinhard Kienberger	Germany
2009	Rajesh Menon	USA
2008	Zeev Zalevsky	Israel
2007	Susana Marcos	Spain
2006	Hideyuki Sotobayashi	Japan
2005	Immanuel Bloch	Germany
2004	Ashok V. Krishnamoorthy	USA and India
2003	Benjamin J. Eggleton	Australia
2002	Prize not awarded	
2001	Nabeel A. Riza	Pakistan and USA
2000	Stefan W. Hell	Germany
1999	Hugo Thienpont	Belgium
1998	David Mendlovic &	Israel

1998	& Haldun Ozaktas	Turkey
1997	Andrew M. Weiner	USA
1996	Vladimir Buzek	Slovakia
1995	Tony F. Heinz	USA
1994	Emmanuel Desurvire	France and USA
1993	Aleksander K. Rebane	Estonia and Switzerland
1992	Wolfgang Peter Schleich	Germany
1991	David A. B. Miller	UK and USA
1990	Rosario Martinez-Herrero	Spain
1989	Demetri Psaltis	USA and Greece
1987	Alain Aspect	France
1986	Kensuke Ikeda	Japan
1985	Sergei I. Stepanov	USSR
1984	J. Christopher Dainty	UK
1983	James R. Fienup	USA
1982	Antoine Labeyrie	France

=== IUPAP Young Scientist Prize in Optics ===
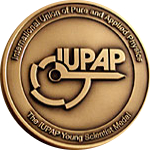
IUPAP medal

=== ICO Galileo Galilei Medal Award ===
This award for the essential missions to recognize the promotion of Optics under difficult circumstances. It was established in 1993 by General Assembly of ICO, and has been awarded annually since 1994.

List of the award winners:

- 1994: Ion N. Mihailescu, Romania.
- 1995: Rajpal S. Sirohi, India.
- 1996: Daniel Malacara, Mexico.
- 1997: Natalyia D. Kundikova, Russia.
- 1998: Ajoy K. Ghatak, India.
- 1999: Mario Garavaglia, Argentina.
- 2000: Vladimir P. Lukin, Russia.
- 2001: Kehar Singh, India.
- 2002: Rashid A. Ganeev, Uzbekistan.
- 2003: Cid B. de Araujo, Brazil.
- 2004: Milivoj Belic, Serbia and Montenegro and Caesar Saloma, Philippines, ex-aequo.
- 2005: Valentin Vlad, Romania.
- 2006: Mohammed M. Shabat, Gaza, Palestine.
- 2007: Oleg V. Angelsy, Ukraine.
- 2008: Joewono Widjaja, Thailand.
- 2009: Marat S. Soskin, Ukraine and Dumitru Mihalache, Romania.
- 2010: Mohammad Taghi Tavassoly, Iran.
- 2011: Jan Peřina, Czech Republic.
- 2012: Mikhail V. Fedorov, Russia.
- 2013: Kazimierz Rzążewski, Poland.
- 2014: Chandra Shaker, India.
- 2015: Aram Papoyan, Armenia.
- 2016: Guillermo H. Kaufmann, Argentina.
- 2017: Alexander Nosich, Ukraine.
- 2018: Debabrata Goswami, India.
- 2019: Malik Maaza, South Africa.
- 2020: Jorge Ojeda-Castañeda, México.
- 2021: Victor Balykin, Russia

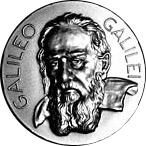
The Galileo Galilei Medal

== See also ==
- Society for Imaging Science and Technology
