= ParisTech =

Group of engineering schools in France

Coordinates: 48.8330°N 2.3590°E

- Former names: ParisTech Institute of Science and Technology
- Type: association
- Established: 1991
- President: Christian Lerminiaux
- Academic staff: 1,500
- Students: 12,500
- Location: Paris, France
- Website: www.paristech.fr/en

ParisTech (French pronunciation: [paʁitɛk]) is a cluster of 7 grandes écoles based in Paris, France. It covers the whole spectrum of science, technology and management and has more than 12,000 students.

The training programmes in engineering bring them together. ParisTech schools also offer Master programmes, Advanced Masters (French: Mastères Spécialisés), MBA programmes and PhD programmes.

== History ==
In 1991, a number of engineering Grandes Écoles set up a coordinating voluntary association, called "Grandes écoles d'ingénieurs de Paris", to foster closer collaboration in areas of common interest and thereby acquire international recognition as an entity of sufficient size and importance. In 1999, its name was changed to "ParisTech".

In 2007, ParisTech's status changed to a higher education institution (public establishment for scientific cooperation, French: établissement public de coopération scientifique). It was headed by a president, assisted by an executive bureau and a secretary general and administrated by a board of directors, supported by a strategic orientation council and a scientific council. The board of directors includes one representative of each college or institute as well as researchers, faculty members, and one representative of the students.

In 2016, ParisTech became a foundation under the umbrella of Fondation ParisTech, which was founded in 2010. At first, ParisTech had 10 members, but in 2016 it had only seven members. As of 2018, the president of ParisTech is Christian Lerminiaux (Chimie ParisTech), and the vice presidents are Sophie Mougard (Ecole des Ponts) and Gilles Trystram (AgroParisTech). In 2022, ParisTech became a nonprofit organisation under French law (per association loi 1901).

== Members ==
The member institutes of ParisTech are long-established grandes écoles, many of which were founded in the 18th century. Some deliver broad education in sciences while others provide research-focused level of expertise in selected scientific disciplines.

ParisTech was a former member of the IDEA League, an alliance between universities in science and technology in Europe, and is still a member of the ATHENS Programme. It is a member of the CESAER, the European association of universities in science and technology.

The member colleges and institutes are:

- École Nationale Supérieure d'Arts et Métiers (Arts et Métiers), founded in 1780
- Institut des sciences et industries du vivant et de l'environnement (AgroParisTech), founded in 2007
- École supérieure de physique et de chimie industrielles de la ville de Paris (ESPCI Paris - PSL), founded in 1882
- École nationale supérieure de chimie de Paris (Chimie Paris - PSL), founded in 1896
- École nationale supérieure des mines de Paris (Mines Paris - PSL), founded in 1783
- Institut d'Optique Graduate School (SupOptique), founded in 1920

=== Former members ===
- École nationale des ponts et chaussées (École des Ponts ParisTech), founded in 1747
- École nationale de la statistique et de l'administration économique (ENSAE Paris), founded in 1942
- École nationale supérieure des télécommunications (Télécom Paris), founded in 1878
- École nationale supérieure de techniques avancées (ENSTA Paris), founded in 1741
- École polytechnique, founded in 1794

== Locations ==
Arts et Métiers, ESPCI Paris - PSL, Chimie ParisTech - PSL and Mines Paris - PSL are located close to one another in the Latin Quarter, the district on the left bank of the Seine river. However, some institutes also created additional sites on the outskirts of Paris or in other parts of the country.

Some years ago, the École nationale des ponts et chaussées eventually moved its educational and research facilities to more spacious facilities in greater Paris, in Marne-la-Vallée (East). SupOptique and AgroParisTech have relocated to the Palaiseau campus.

Besides its Paris-Saclay location, AgroParisTech is also located at eight other sites, including sites on the Parisian outskirts, in other parts of mainland France, and Guyane. Similarly for Arts et Métiers, only the main one of its 8 campuses is located in Paris. The other teaching and research centres are spread in the country, closer to the industrial fabric of each region. Different specialisations are available in the campuses, such as Aerospace in Bordeaux and materials science in Metz.

== Education ==
ParisTech schools provide postgraduate-level courses in science and technology, either independently or in collaboration with other institutions. Its main programmes are:

- The "Ingénieur" degree (equivalent to a master's degree of science in engineering), which includes coursework in engineering science and introductory economics, management and communication. Admission is based on performance in nationwide competitive exams for students having completed two years of Classes Préparatoires in France or abroad, or by virtue of academic records.
- The Master of Science (MSc) programmes, which includes coursework in various fields of science, such as mathematics and economics, and is offered by individual schools. Admission to MSc programmes is open to students holding a Bachelor of Science or a Bachelor of Engineering from a French or international university. Each master programme has its own specific admissions requirements.
- Mastères spécialisés (Post-master professional certificates), which enable students who have already completed a master's degree to further specialise their knowledge in a specific field.
- Doctoral programmes (PhD), whose enrollment is handled by each doctoral school to which the host laboratory is attached.

ParisTech has also developed since 2019 the RACINE network for pedagogical training of teachers. The network organises 10 workshops each year that are dedicated to teaching in engineering schools.

== Research ==
ParisTech schools hosted Fields Medal awardees, such as Pierre-Louis Lions, and Nobel Prize awardees, such as Maurice Allais, Pierre-Gilles de Gennes, Georges Charpak and Alain Aspect.

The French National Centre for Scientific Research has delivered awards to researchers of ParisTech schools' laboratories:

- a Gold Medal to Alain Aspect.
- the Silver Medal to Jacques Prost, Philippe Grangier, Jérôme Bibette, Catherine Bréchignac, Mathias Fink, Michel Callon, Daniel Lincot, Ludwik Leibler, Michel Fliess, Francisco Chinesta, Janine Cossy, Tatiana Budtova, Anke Lindner, Antoine Browaeys and Philippe Goldner.
- the Bronze Medal to Valentina Krachmalnicoff, Olivier Couture, Teresa Lopez-Leon, Kevin Vinck, Guillaume Lefèvre, Sylvain Patient.

ParisTech schools host also a lot of grantees of the European Research Council:

- AgroParisTech: Kalina Haas (Starting grant), Antoine Missemer (Starting grant, with Ecole des Ponts ParisTech: CIRED)
- Arts et Métiers: Nicolas Ranc (Consolidator grant)
- Chimie ParisTech - PSL: Ilaria Ciofini (Advanced grant), Philippe Marcus (Advanced Grant), Gilles Gasser (Consolidator Grant & Proof of Concept), Guillaume Lefèvre (Starting Grant), Philippe Goldner (Advanced grant), Carlo Adamo (Advanced Grant)
- Ecole des Ponts ParisTech: Philippe Jehiel (Advanced grant), Ioannis Stefanou (Starting Grant), Eric Cances (Synergy Grant), Mathieu Aubry (Starting grant), Vincent Lepetit (Advanced Grant)
- ESPCI Paris - PSL: Costantino Creton (Advanced grant & Synergy grant), Luca de Mici (Advanced grant), Eörs Szathmary (PoC), Klaus Eyer (Starting grant), Sandrine Ithurria (Starting grant), Anke Lindner (Consolidator grant), Sylvain Gigan, Karim Benchenane (Consolidator grant), Alexandre Aubry (Consolidator grant), Mickael Tanter, Bruno Andreotti (Starting grant), Manuel Thery (Starting grant), Martin Lenz (Starting grant), Thomas Preat (Advanced grant), Philippe Nghe (Consolidator grant & Proof of Concept), Klaus Eyer (Starting grant), Clément Papadacci (Starting grant)
- Institut d'Optique: Laurent Sanchez-Palencia (Starting grant), Alexei Ourjoumtsev (Advanced grant), Pierre Bon (starting grant), Philippe Grangier (advanced grant), Antoine Browaeys (Starting grant & Advanced grant), Igor Ferrier-Barbut (starting grant), Philippe Lalanne (Advanced grant)
- MINES ParisTech - PSL: Fabian Muniesa (Starting grant), Jean-Philippe Vert (Starting grant), Zaki Leghtas (Starting Grant), Pierre Rouchon (Advanced Grant), Elie Hachem (Consolidator grant)
- Claire Chenut, Professor in soil science at AgroParisTech, was award the "Laurier d'or de la recherche agronomique" of INRAE in 2019.
- Céline Guivarch, researcher at Ecole des Ponts ParisTech, obtained the Irène Joliot Curie Prize for young woman scientist in 2020.

ParisTech schools have also created chairs funded by private partners:

- Chaire BioMecam Handicap & Innovation since 2010 with Arts et Métiers et ESPCI Paris - PSL and support of Société générale, Fondation Cotrel, Proteor and COVEA
- Chaire Mines urbaines (Urban Mining): since 2014 Arts et Métiers, Chimie ParisTech - PSL and MINES ParisTech - PSL with support of ecosystem
- The Lab Research Environment VINCI ParisTech since 2008
- The Institute of sustainable mobility (Institut de la mobilité durable) funded by Renault since 2009

== International ==
ParisTech schools recruit since more than 20 years international students in China, Brazil, Colombia, Russia and, since 2018, in Argentina. In 2021, ParisTech opened the ParisTech International Admission Programme to new countries and regions in Asia: Cambodia, Hong Kong, India, Indonesia, Japan, Laos, Macao, Malaysia, Singapore, South Korea, Taiwan, Thailand, Vietnam, and, in 2022, to individual candidates worldwide.

ParisTech has also developed a network in Europe called ATHENS Programme (since 1997), with 14 European partner institutions. Some of ParisTech's schools are involved in European universities. Chimie ParisTech, Ecole des Ponts ParisTech and Mines Paris are members of the European University EELISA (European Engineering Learning Innovation Science Alliance). AgroParisTech and Institut d'Optique are members of EUGLOH via University of Paris-Saclay.

ParisTech schools contribute to 4 Sino-French Institutes in China: in Shanghai with SPEIT (Mines Paris - PSL), in Wuhan with the Sino-European Institute ICARE for renewable energy (Mines Paris - PSL), in Guangzhou with IFCEN (Chimie ParisTech - PSL) and, since 2017, in Beijing with the Chimie Pékin institute (Chimie ParisTech - PSL).
