= Anna Consortini =

Italian physicist

- Education: University of Florence
- Awards: Robert E Hopkins Leadership Award, 2018
- Scientific career
- Fields: Optics, Physics

Anna Consortini is an Italian physicist and a retired Professor of Physics at the University of Florence. She was a founder of the Italian Society for Optics and Photonics, and President of the International Commission for Optics from 1993 to 1996.

== Early life and education ==
Consortini studied at Liceo Classico, then earned a master's degree in physics at the University of Florence (20 February 1959, 105/110) and a PhD in Electromagnetic Waves (Rome 1968).

== Research and career ==
From 1959 to 1983 Consortini worked as researcher at the "Istituto di Ricerca sulle Onde Elettromagnetiche" (IROE) of the National Research Council in Italy (CNR) which is now called IFAC-CNR. Consortini was director of the group of theoretical and experimental research on atmospheric propagation. She also established the Computer Center of the Institute and was the Center Director until 1978. In 1983, Consortini became associate professor in general physics at the University of Florence until her retirement.

Consortini is the author of Trends in Optics.

== Fellowships and awards ==
Consortini has received the following academic honours:

- President of the International Commission for Optics (1993-1996).
- Fellow of the OSA and 2018 recipient of the Robert E. Hopkins Leadership Award
- Fellow of the Institute of Physics
- Fellow of the European Optical Society
- Fellow of SPIE
- Emeritus member of the Italian Society of Optics and Photonics (SIOF).
- Member of EPS and the Società Italiana di Fisica, Italian Physical Society.
