= Antonino Riccardo Luciani =

Italian composer

- Born: 10 August 1931; Palermo, Italy
- Died: 29 January 2020 (aged 88); Florence, Italy
- Other names: A. Riccardo Luciani; Antonino R. Luciani; Riccardo Lucciani
- Occupation: Composer

Antonino Riccardo Luciani (10 August 1931 – 29 January 2020) was an Italian classical composer, conductor and academic.

== Life and career ==
Born in Palermo, Luciani moved with his family in Florence when he was two years old. Following his early studies by Clemente Terni, at 17 he moved to Canavese to become the last pupil of Rosario Scalero. After studying counterpoint with Scalero for three years and a half, he returned to Florence, where he graduated in composition from the Luigi Cherubini Conservatory, and attended Vito Frazzi's specialisation courses at the Accademia Chigiana. His early compositions include the chamber opera Lo starnuto and the sonatina Sonatina Chigiana. After getting his diploma, Luciani moved in Bogotà for three years, where he studied South American music and worked as professor of orchestra and choir conducting and music teaching.

Returned to Italy, Luciani started collaborating with RAI as a composer, and became professor of score reading in his alma mater. During this period he also collaborated with the Fiesole School of Music, and authored numerous compositions including the opera Talgor with a libretto by Giuliano Toraldo di Francia, the cantata Hoy como ayer, and the sacred cantata Ecco, verranno i giorni. In 1976, he wrote his best known composition, Chanson balladée, which was for 16 years the opening theme of Rai 1 programme Almanacco del giorno dopo.

Starting from 1991, Luciani collaborated with Orchestra della Toscana. On the occasion of Mozart's bicentenary, he composed another well-known work, the symphonic composition for string orchestra Le tombeau perdu. He died in Florence on 29 January 2020, at the age of 88.

== Partial discography ==
- 1970: Panoramiche
- 1970: Musiche Per Un Telefilm (with Paolo Renosto)
- 1970: Contraspunti
- 1971: Musica Poliformale
- 1971: Civiltà Sepolte
- 1971: Panorami Attuali
- 1972: Agonia della Civiltà
- 1973: Allarme Ecologico
- 1975: Situazioni
- 1975: Europa 1930-1940
- 1975: Documenti di Storia
- 1975: Musica Arcaica
- 1975: Dal Medioevo al Rinascimento
- 1976: Ambiente e Musica
- 1976: Jazz in Libertà
- 1976: Mediterranee
- 1976: Paesi del Sud
- 1976: Barocchiade
- 1977: Gli Occhi sulla Città
- 1978: Eventi
- 1979: Cronache
- 1979: Psyco Mood
- 1979: Tecnica di un colpo di stato
- 1980: Atmosfere (with Marco Melchiori)
- 1980: Aspetti della Natura (with Marco Melchiori)
- 1983: "Picnic"
- 1984: Contemporary Classics
