= ATHENS Programme =

European higher education systems

The ATHENS Programme (for Advanced Technology Higher Education Network/Socrates) is a 1-week exchange session, held twice a year (in March and in November), by a network of European higher education institutions (universities, universities of technology, Grandes Ecoles...).

The programme is coordinated by ParisTech.

== History ==
Created in 1996, it was initially supported by the European Union through the Socrates programme (from 1997 to 2001). It is now self-funded by the member institutions.

It is a merger of the 'Semaine Européenne' ('European Week') held by ParisTech from 1992 to 1999, and the Leuven Network ERASMUS Programme held by European institutions from 1990 to 1997.

== Courses ==
The courses proposed during sessions cover not only the spectrum of the members' fields, but also an opening on arts and humanities.

== Activities ==
During the week, the host university is supposed to organize activities for the foreign students in the city, to help them discover another culture. Most often, it will consist in a tour of the city a 5-day course on a specific subject and some nights with the local students.

== Members ==
- AUTh Thessaloniki
- BME Budapest
- TU Delft
- KU Leuven
- UCLouvain
- IST Lisbon
- UP Madrid
- Politecnico di Milano
- TU Munich
- CTU Prague
- KTH Stockholm
- NTNU Trondheim
- TU Wien
- Warsaw University of Technology
- ITU Istanbul
- ParisTech:
  - Chimie ParisTech (ENSCP)
  - Institut d'Optique Graduate School (IOGS)
  - AgroParisTech
  - Ecole Nationale des Ponts et Chaussées (ENPC)
  - Ecole des ingenieurs de la Ville de Paris (EIVP)
  - Ecole Nationale de la Statistique et de l'Administration Economique (ENSAE)
  - Ecole Nationale Superieure des Arts et Métiers (ENSAM)
  - Ecole Nationale Superieure des Mines de Paris (ENSMP)
  - Télécom ParisTech
  - Ecole Nationale Superieure de Techniques Avancées (ENSTA)
  - École supérieure de physique et de chimie industrielles de la ville de Paris (ESPCI)

Note: Not all members participate in both sessions.
