= Zeev Zalevsky =

Israeli engineer and scientist (born 1971)

- זאב זלבסקי
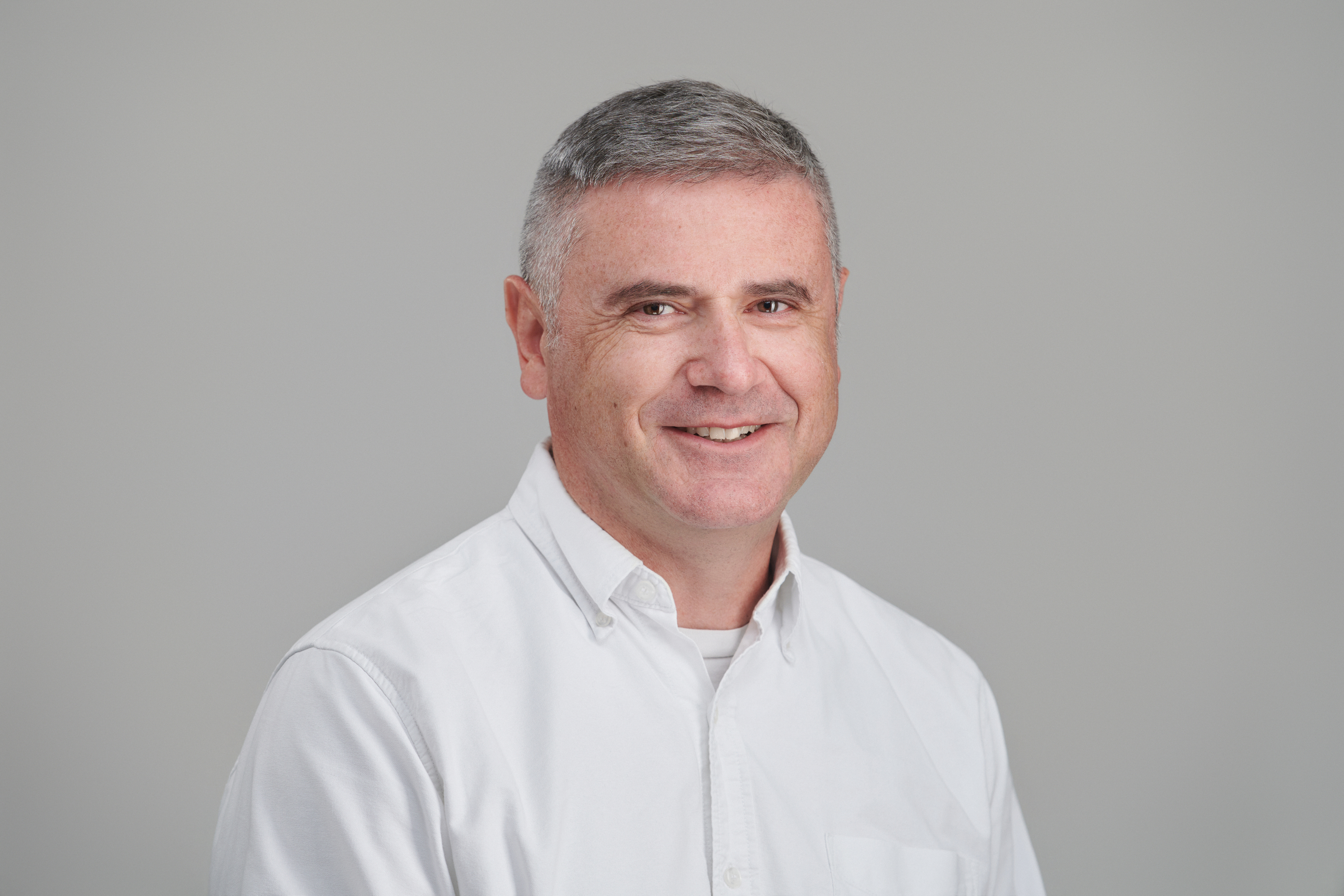
- Prof. Zeev Zalevsky, Bar-Ilan University
- Citizenship: Israel
- Education: Tel Aviv University
- Known for: Super-resolution imaging; Optical signal processing
- Scientific career
- Fields: Optical engineering; Biomedical optics; Nanophotonics; Optical computing
- Workplaces: Bar-Ilan University
- Doctoral advisor: David Mendlovic

Zeev Zalevsky (Hebrew: זאב זלבסקי; born 20 February 1971) is an Israeli physicist and electrical engineer, and a professor in the Faculty of Engineering at Bar-Ilan University. His research focuses on optical super-resolution, biomedical optics, nanophotonics, and optical sensing, addressing both theoretical and applied aspects of optical signal processing and imaging systems. He has held senior academic leadership positions and has been involved in the commercialization of optical and biomedical technologies.

== Early life and education ==
Zalevsky earned his B.Sc. in Electrical Engineering from Tel Aviv University in 1993 and completed his Ph.D. there in 1996. His doctoral thesis focused on unconventional optical processors for pattern recognition and signal processing.

== Academic career ==
Zalevsky joined Bar-Ilan University in 2004, where he was promoted to associate professor in 2007 and to full professor in 2010. He has held senior academic leadership positions at the university, including serving as Dean of the Faculty of Engineering and, since October 2024, as vice president for Academia–Industry Relations.

== Entrepreneurial endeavors ==
Zalevsky has been involved in the commercialization of research in optics and biomedical engineering. He is a co-founder of ContinUse Biometrics, a company established in 2015 that develops contact-free optical technologies for health monitoring.

== Research ==
Zalevsky's research addresses theoretical and applied aspects of optical signal processing and imaging systems, with a focus on super-resolution imaging, biomedical optics, nanophotonics, and optical computing.

== Awards and recognition ==
- SPIE Dennis Gabor Award in Diffractive Optics (2025), awarded by SPIE.
- SPIE Chandra S. Vikram Award in Optical Metrology (2025), awarded by SPIE.
- SPIE Chandra S. Vikram Award in Optical Metrology (2023), awarded by SPIE.
- Meitner Humboldt Research Award (Humboldt-Forschungspreis) (2022), awarded by the Alexander von Humboldt Foundation.
- Joseph Fraunhofer Award / Robert M. Burley Prize (2021), awarded by Optica.
- SPIE Prism Award for Photonic Innovation (2018), awarded by SPIE.
- Image Engineering Innovation Award (2015), awarded by the Society for Imaging Science and Technology.
- Outstanding Young Scientist Award (OYSA) (2015), awarded by NANOSMAT.
- SAOT (School for Advanced Optical Technologies) Young Researcher Award (2011), awarded by University of Erlangen–Nuremberg.
- ICO Prize and Abbe Medal (2008), awarded by the International Commission for Optics.
- Krill Prize (2007), awarded by the Wolf Foundation.

== Fellowships ==
- Fellow of SPIE (2010).
- Fellow of the Optical Society (OSA) (2012).
- Fellow of the European Optical Society (EOS) (2014).
- Fellow of the Institution of Engineering and Technology (IET) (2016).
- Fellow of the Institute of Physics (IOP) (2016).
- Fellow of the Institute of Electrical and Electronics Engineers (IEEE) (2019).
- Fellow of the American Institute for Medical and Biological Engineering (AIMBE), College of Fellows (Class of 2021).
- Fellow of the National Academy of Inventors (NAI) (2017).
