= Edoardo Boncinelli =

Italian geneticist (1941–2025)

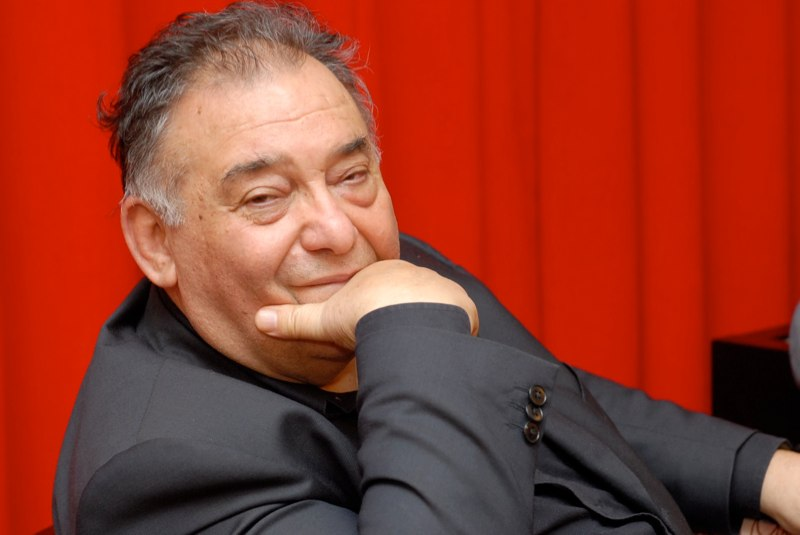
Boncinelli in 2008

Edoardo Boncinelli (18 May 1941 – 20 July 2025) was an Italian geneticist and physicist who, together with some collaborators, discovered a family of genes, called homeogenes – part of the homeobox DNA region – which control correct bodily development in humans.

== Life and career ==
Boncinelli was born of Florentine parents and studied and lived in Florence, graduating in physics at the University of Florence with an experimental electronics thesis quantum science, with speaker Giuliano Toraldo di Francia. He was director of the molecular developmental biology laboratory at the San Raffaele University Scientific Institute and director of research at the center for the study of cellular and molecular pharmacology of the CNR in Milan. He was director of SISSA (International School of Advanced Studies of Trieste). He taught Biological Foundations of Knowledge at the Faculty of Philosophy of the Vita-Salute San Raffaele University in Milan. On 29 January 2016, he received an honorary master's degree in philosophical sciences from the University of Palermo. Boncinelli died on 20 July 2025, at the age of 84.
