= JEOS =

JEOS may refer to:

- Just enough operating system
- Journal of the European Optical Society: Rapid Publications
