= UNESCO Niels Bohr Medal =

Medal to commemorate 100th anniversary of the birth of Niels Bohr

The UNESCO Niels Bohr Medal was first minted in 1985 to commemorate the 100th anniversary of the birth of the Danish nuclear physicist Niels Bohr. It is awarded by UNESCO to recognise those who have made outstanding contributions to physics through research that has or could have a significant influence on the world.

== The medal ==
In 1985, the 100th anniversary of the birth of Niels Bohr, UNESCO minted a gold medal to commemorate the father of quantum physics and one of the most eminent scientists of the 20th century. Sculpted by Siv Holme-Muse of Sweden, the medal bears the profile of Bohr while the rear depicts his drawing of electrons orbiting around an atomic structure, his formula E2-E1=hy2 representing electrons in relation to hydrogen, and his signature. It also bears the inscription: Contraria sunt complementa (Opposites are complementary), Bohr's principle of complementarity.

== 2013 awards ==
Jimmy Wales of Wikipedia was one of the three celebrities who were presented with the medal for 2013 at an event in honour of the 100th anniversary of Bohr's atomic model. The other two were the German particle physicist and director of CERN Rolf-Dieter Heuer, who accepted the medal on behalf of the CERN laboratory, and the French physicist Alain Aspect, noted for his work on quantum entanglement. The medals were presented at the University of Copenhagen conference on "An Open World" on 5 December 2013 by Princess Marie of Denmark. In connection with the ceremony, Wales participated in the session "The Internet: A Global Infrastructure of Openness?" with a presentation titled "Wikipedia, Democracy and the Internet".

== Recipients ==
Recipients of the UNESCO gold medal include:

1998

- Vitaly Ginzburg
- Walter Kohn

2005

- Martin Rees
- Herwig Schopper
- Peter Zoller

2010

- John Pendry
- Timothy Berners-Lee
- Kip S. Thorne

2013

- Alain Aspect
- CERN (presented to Rolf-Dieter Heuer)
- Jimmy Wales

== See also ==
- List of engineering awards
- List of physics awards
- Niels Bohr International Gold Medal
