= Christopher Dainty =

Physicist

John Christopher Dainty is a professor who researches optical imaging, scattering and propagation. In these areas he has published books: Scattering in Volumes and Surfaces (1989, co-edited with M Nieto-Vesperinas), Laser Speckle and Related Phenomena (1975, 2nd Ed. 1984, editor) and Image Science (1974) which he co-authored with Rodney Shaw. He has co-authored around 170 peer-reviewed papers and some 300 conference presentations.

== Career ==
From 1974 to 1978, Dainty was a lecturer in physics at Queen Elizabeth College of the University of London. He joined the Institute of Optics at the University of Rochester 1978 and the faculty of the Department of Physics and Astronomy in July 1982. He became Pilkington Professor of Applied Optics at Imperial College in January 1984 and was SERC Senior Research Fellow for the period October 1987 to September 1992. From October 2001 to September 2002 he was a PPARC Senior Research Fellow. In October 2002, Professor Dainty moved to The National University of Ireland, Galway, where he is currently chair of applied physics and Science Foundation Ireland PI. He is simultaneously on extended leave from Imperial College.

Dainty founded an Industrial Associates Scheme at Imperial College and at NUI Galway has established links with companies in ICT, healthcare and other industries.

Dainty is the 1984 recipient of the International Commission of Optics Prize, the 1993 Thomas Young Medal and Prize (IoP), the 2003 C.E.K. Mees Medal (OSA), the Optics and Photonics Division Prize 2004 (IoP) and the 2017 Robert E. Hopkins Leadership Award (OSA). He is also a Fellow of The Optical Society of America, SPIE, The Institute of Physics (UK) and The European Optical Society. In March 2008 he was elected a Member of the Royal Irish Academy.

From 1983 to 1985 he was elected to the board of directors of the Optical Society (OSA) - 1987–1990 he was elected secretary-general of the ICO, president for the term 1990–1993 and was past president from 1993 to 1996 - and 1994 to 1996 he was elected to the Board of SPIE. Dainty served on the council of the UK Institute of Physics (1996–1999). He was a director at large of the OSA for the period 2005–2007 and 2011 president of OSA (past president in 2012). He is a member of the IEEE P2020 Standards Development body for Automotive Imaging.
