= Municipal or urban engineering =

Municipal or urban engineering applies the tools of science, art and engineering in an urban environment.

Municipal engineering is concerned with municipal infrastructure. This involves specifying, designing, constructing, and maintaining streets, sidewalks, water supply networks, sewers, street lighting, municipal solid waste management and disposal, storage depots for various bulk materials used for maintenance and public works (salt, sand, etc.), public parks and cycling infrastructure.

In the case of underground utility networks, it may also include the civil portion (conduits and access chambers) of the local distribution networks of electrical and telecommunications services. It can also include the optimizing of garbage collection and bus service networks. Some of these disciplines overlap with other civil engineering specialties, however municipal engineering focuses on the coordination of these infrastructure networks and services, as they are often built simultaneously (for a given street or development project), and managed by the same municipal authority.

== History ==
Modern municipal engineering finds its origins in the 19th-century United Kingdom, following the Industrial Revolution and the growth of large industrial cities. The threat to urban populations from epidemics of waterborne diseases such as cholera and typhus led to the development of a profession devoted to "sanitary science" that later became "municipal engineering".

A key figure of the so-called "public health movement" was Edwin Chadwick, author of the parliamentary report, published in 1842.

Early British legislation included:

- Burgh Police Act 1833 - powers of paving, lighting, cleansing, watching, supplying with water and improving their communities.
- Municipal Corporations Act 1835
- Public Health Act 1866 – formation of drainage boards
- Public Health Act 1875 (38 & 39 Vict. c. 55) known at the time as the Great Public Health Act

This legislation provided local authorities with powers to undertake municipal engineering projects and to appoint borough surveyors (later known as "municipal engineers").

In the U.K, the Association of Municipal Engineers, (subsequently named Institution of Municipal Engineers), was established in 1874 under the encouragement of the Institution of Civil Engineers, to address the issue of the application of sanitary science. By the early 20th century, Municipal Engineering had become a broad discipline embracing many of the responsibilities undertaken by local authorities, including roads, drainage, flood control, coastal engineering, public health, waste management, street cleaning, water supply, sewers, waste water treatment, crematoria, public baths, slum clearance, town planning, public housing, energy supply, parks, leisure facilities, libraries, town halls and other municipal buildings.

In the UK, the development of different strands of knowledge necessary for the management of municipal infrastructure led to the emergence of separate specialised institutions, including:

- For drainage: Chartered Institution of Water and Environmental Management, 1895
- For street lighting: Association of Public Lighting Engineers, 1934...subsequently becoming the Institution of Lighting Engineers
- For highway engineering: Institution of Highways and Transportation, 1930
- For public housing: Institute of Housing, 1931

In 1984 the Institution of Municipal Engineers merged with the Institution of Civil Engineers.

Since the 1970s, there has been a global trend toward increasing privatisation and outsourcing of municipal engineering services.

In the UK in the 1990s a change in management philosophy brought the demise of the traditional organisational structure of boroughs where the three functions of town clerk, borough treasurer and borough engineer were replaced by an administrative structure with a larger number of specialised departments.

In the late 1990s and early 21st century there was increasing dissatisfaction over what was perceived to be fractured and dysfunctional public services designed along narrow specialties. A more holistic approach to urban engineering began to emerge as an alternative concept. Critics of the specialised approach included the Commission for Architecture and the Built Environment that complained that the specialised approach to management of the public realm focussed too much on the efficient movement of vehicles rather than the more general interests of local communities.

== Professional practice ==
In the United Kingdom there is no longer any formal professional qualification in municipal engineering although there are degree courses available in urban engineering.

A professional certificate in Urban Engineering is available from through the Institution of Incorporated Engineers via the Public Realm Information and Advice Network.

The British Institution of Civil Engineers (ICE) caters to practitioners employed in the public sector, private consultancy and academia through its Proceedings Journal Municipal Engineer. The journal, first published in 1873, has a global scope and covers the whole life cycle of municipal services addressing technical, political and community issues. In addition an Expert Panel responds on behalf of ICE to Government consultations and is represented on the International Federation of Municipal Engineering.

== International organization ==
The International Federation of Municipal Engineering (IFME) is an organisation comprising professional municipal engineers from all round the world. IFME's mission is to connect municipal engineers, public works professionals, public agencies, institutions and businesses around the world in order that they can share a global pool of knowledge and experience. The aim is to foster continued improvement in the quality of public works and wider community services.

The inaugural meeting was held in 1960 at the UNESCO headquarters in Paris. Membership has grown steadily and in 2009 comprised representatives from national associations in: Australia, Canada, Denmark, Estonia, Finland, Italy, Israel, The Netherlands, New Zealand, Norway, Southern Africa (South Africa, Botawana, Namibia & Zimbabwe), Sweden, UK (England, Scotland, Wales & Northern Ireland) and USA. Belgium and San Marino are presently Corresponding Members.

== Related disciplines ==
Municipal or urban engineering combines elements of environmental engineering, water resources engineering and transport engineering.

Today, municipal engineering may be confused with urban design or urban planning. Whereas the urbanist or urban planner may design the general layout of streets and public places, the municipal engineer is concerned with the detailed design. For example, in the case of the design of a new street, the urbanist may specify the general layout of the street, including landscaping, surface finishings and urban accessories, but the municipal engineer will prepare the detailed plans and specifications for the roads, sidewalks, municipal services and street lighting.

== Site civil works ==
In the case of large buildings or plants, facilities or campuses, site civil works may be required that are similar in scope or type as municipal infrastructure, namely, access roads, parking lots, potable water supply (including fire hydrants), on-site waste water treatment plants, site drainage including sedimentation and retention ponds or basins, etc. In most engineering consulting firms, Structural Engineering and Municipal Infrastructure are typically separate departments. On a large construction project, the civil engineering design will typically be divided into a structural portion, designed by structural engineers and typically focused on the buildings, and "civil" portion, designed by municipal engineers and focused on the site.

== See also ==
- The French School of Urban Engineering

== Sources ==
- Index to the Proceedings of the Institution of Municipal Engineers, from 1874
- The municipal and sanitary engineer's handbook (1883)
