= Niels Bohr International Gold Medal =

International engineering award (since 1955)

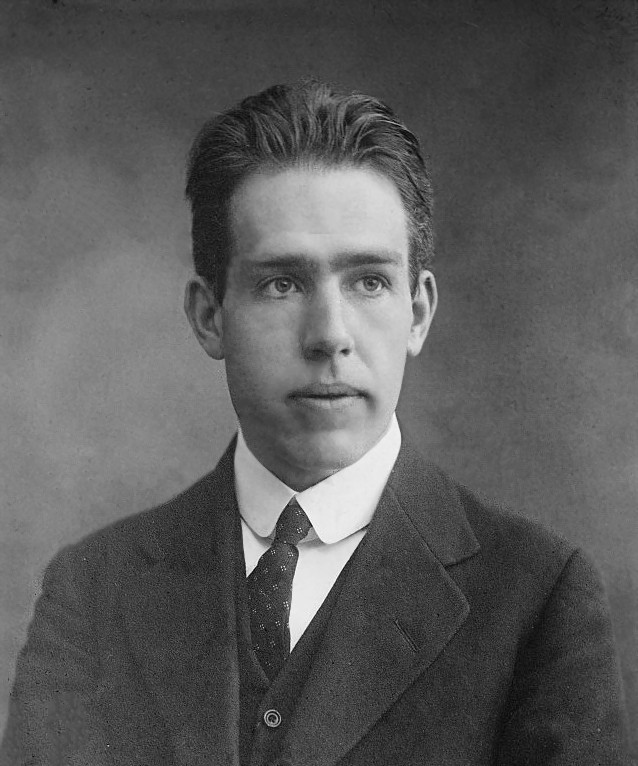
Niels Bohr was the first recipient of the medal in 1955

The Niels Bohr International Gold Medal is an international engineering award. It has been awarded since 1955 for "outstanding work by an engineer or physicist for the peaceful utilization of atomic energy". The medal is administered by the Danish Society of Engineers (Denmark) in collaboration with the Niels Bohr Institute and the Royal Danish Academy of Sciences. It was awarded 10 times between 1955 and 1982 and again in 2013. The first recipient was Niels Bohr himself who received the medal in connection with his 70th birthday.

== 2013 laureate ==
Alain Aspect, regarded as an outstanding figure in optical and atomic physics, was awarded the medal for his experiments on the Bell's inequalities test. It was presented on 7 October 2013 by Queen Margrethe and Prince Henrik at a special event at the Honorary Residence in the Carlsberg Academy.

== Recipients ==
The following scientists have been awarded the Niels Bohr Medal:

- Niels Bohr, 1955
- John Cockcroft, 1958
- George de Hevesy, 1961
- Pyotr Kapitsa, 1965
- Isidor Isaac Rabi, 1967
- Werner Karl Heisenberg, 1970
- Richard P. Feynman, 1973
- Hans A. Bethe, 1976
- Charles H. Townes, 1979
- John Archibald Wheeler, 1982
- Alain Aspect, 2013
- Jens Nørskov, 2018
- Ewine van Dishoeck, 2022

== See also ==
- UNESCO Niels Bohr Medal
- List of engineering awards
- List of physics awards
