= Bram van Heel =

Dutch physicist (1899–1966)

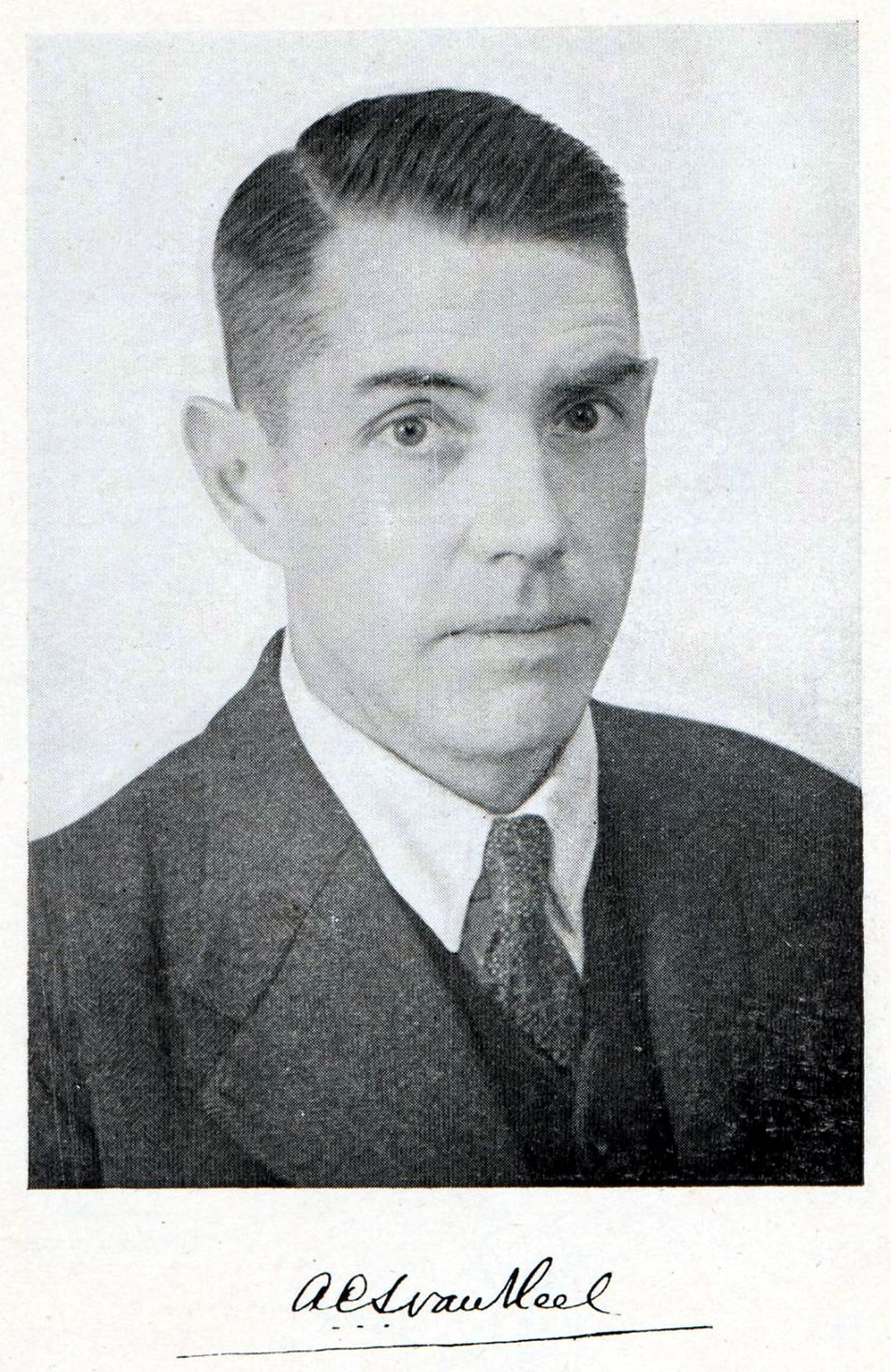
- van Heel in 1948
- Born: Abraham Cornelis Sebastiaan Bram van Heel; 17 July 1899; Pati, Dutch East Indies
- Died: 18 May 1966 (aged 66); Delft, Netherlands
- Education: Leiden University
- Spouse: Huberta Zus Meerburg
- Scientific career
- Fields: Optics
- Thesis: Het vaste lichaam bij lage temperaturen optisch onderzocht (Optical investigation of Solid Body at low temperatures). (1925)

Abraham Cornelis Sebastiaan "Bram" van Heel (17 July 1899 – 18 May 1966) was a Dutch professor of physics at the then TH (now TU) Delft. He is regarded as the 'father of technical optics in the Netherlands'.

== Biography ==
Van Heel was born in Central Java as the son of Abraham Louis Cornelis van Heel, who was born in Düsseldorf, Prussia in 1867 and was the founder and director of the palm oil factories 'Insulinde' in the Dutch East Indies.

Van Heel studied physics at Leiden, where he graduated and obtained his doctorate in October 1925 with Wander de Haas for his thesis. At Leiden University he became inspired by Nobel Prize laureates Hendrik Lorentz and Heike Kamerlingh Onnes, the latter eventually becoming his promotor.

During his studies he spent a year in Paris, in the laboratory of Charles Fabry, the co-inventor of the Fabry-Pérot interferometer, among other things. He also attended lectures there with Henri Chrétien, known, among other things, for the Ritchey-Chrétien telescope.

Van Heel owed his good knowledge of French to this stay in Paris, which contributed to his later international fame in the optical field. Van Heel is best known for his easy-to-apply calculation methods for the design of optical systems and their application in concrete designs. In addition, he was a good teacher. With his students, he designed optical instruments for the observatory of Utrecht University. He was also active in various international forums in his field. For example, he was co-founder of the International Commission for Optics (ICO) (1948) and of the trade magazine Optica Acta (1954), the predecessor of the current Journal of Modern Optics.

He was one of the founders of two companies in Delft, namely the Optical Industry “De Oude Delft” (later Oldelft), and Nonius, which made precision instruments and later merged with Enraf into Enraf-Nonius).

He wrote the well-known textbook Introduction to optics, which for many years was the standard textbook in this field at Delft University of Technology, among others.

Two sons were born from his marriage to Huberta (Zus) Meerburg, Abraham Lodewijk Sebastien, married to Dr AMCT Kasteel, former member of the House of Representatives of the States General and Prof. Huib van Heel, former professor at TU Delft.

In 1964 he uttered the famous phrase: "Het licht komt altijd van links...behalve als het van rechts komt" ('The light always comes from the left, except when it comes from the right.') This quote is still prominently displayed at the ImPhys Optica research group at TU Delft.

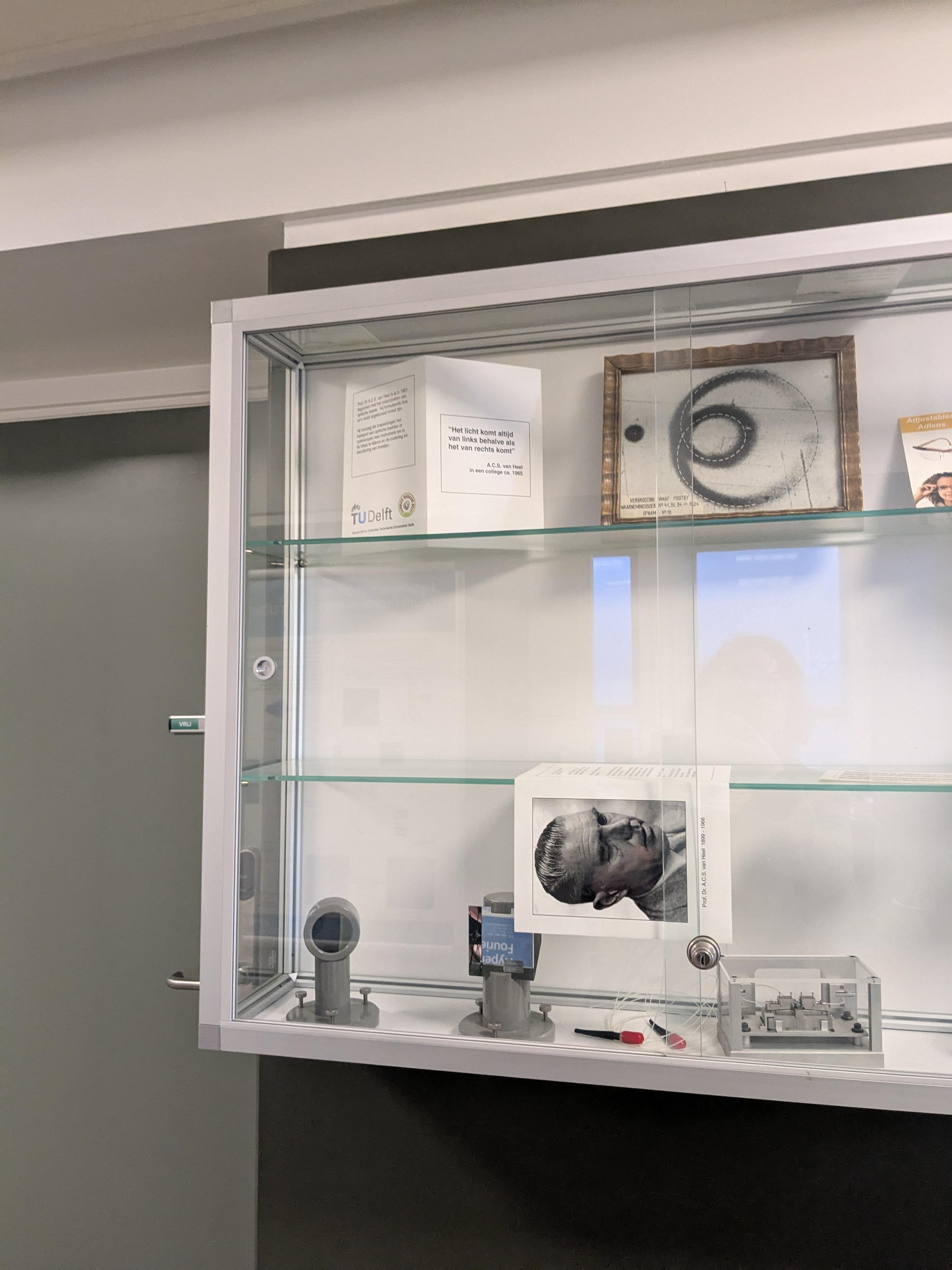
Van Heel quote displayed within the ImPhys Optica research group, TU Delft.
