= École des ingénieurs de la Ville de Paris =

French grande ecole of urban engineering

École des ingénieurs de la ville de Paris
- Type: Grandes Ecoles
- Established: 1959
- Affiliations: Gustave Eiffel University
- Location: Paris, France; 48°52′27″N 2°22′55″E
- Campus: 80 rue Rébeval, 19th arrondissement of Paris
- Website: EIVP

The École des ingénieurs de la ville de Paris (Engineering School of the City of Paris) is the only French grande école with an emphasis on urban engineering.

The top-level graduate school, which is already actively involved in networks bringing together distinguished schools of higher education, has taken another step by partnering with École des Ponts ParisTech.

Established in 1959 to educate the junior civil servants for the City of Paris, EIVP nowadays also educates young professionals for the private sector. They have to deal with the educational disciplines linked to cities: building, urbanism, transportation and environment. Foreign students are welcomed to train for a one or two year curriculum (via ERASMUS or n+i), or for internships.

The students are recruited through a competitive exam after 2 to 3 years of higher education (equivalent of college), usually in preparatory classes to enter elite schools ("classes préparatoires"). Laureates acquire a status of trainee civil servant, and receive a salary while they are students at the school.

EIVP students are selected through an exacting, highly competitive process and are particularly well trained: 100 students join the school every year.

A new campus opened during fall 2012 at 80 rue Rebeval, in the 19th arrondissement of Paris, in the former building of the Ecole d'Architecture Paris-Belleville, which was also a former factory of Meccano model construction system.

EIVP students participate each year in ATHENS Programme.

== Alumni ==
- Édouard Fritch
- Jacques Monthioux, director of The Paris Heritage and Architecture Services
- Ghislaine Geffroy, director of the Paris Roads and travel Services
- Christophe Dalstein, director of Europa City
- Céline Lepault, chief engineer for the Velib'
- Sylvain Marty, chief engineer for the Autolib'
