= André Maréchal =

French physicist

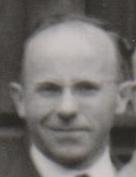
André Maréchal 1952 in London

Robert Gaston André Maréchal (10 December 1916 – 14 October 2007) was a French researcher and administrator in optics.

André Maréchal was former director general of the French Institut d'Optique. In 1986 Maréchal was elected to Honorary Membership of the Optical Society its highest honor, for his work in the areas of coherence, diffraction, geometric optics, image formation and image processing, and for his contributions to the international optics community. He was also a Fellow of that society, elected in its inaugural class in 1959. His pioneering work influenced the development of computer programs that optimized lens designs and advanced the automatic optimization of optical systems. He strongly contributed to the promotion of Fourier optics and analog optical computing.

Maréchal graduated from the École normale supérieure in 1941, and received his engineer's degree from SupOptique (École supérieure d'optique) in 1943. He received a doctor of science degree in engineering from the University of Paris in 1948. For his thesis research, he investigated the combined effects of diffraction and aberrations and derived what is now known as the Maréchal criterion. Formally, that a wavefront can be regarded as diffraction-limited if its RMS phase error is 14 times less than its wavelength.

Maréchal served as president of the International Commission for Optics (1962–1966), honorary vice president of the Comité français de physique, and was a founding member of the Franco-Finnish Association for Scientific and Technical Research. He was a member of the French Academy of Sciences, and of the French Academy of Technologies.

He died on 14 October 2007 at the age of 90.

== Awards ==
- 1965 - Young Medal and Prize
- 1977 - C.E.K. Mees Medal
- 1986 - Honorary Membership of the Optical Society
- 1989 - SPIE Gold Medal
