= Kehar Singh (physicist) =

Indian optical physicist

- Born: 3 July 1941 (age 84); Haraula, Uttar Pradesh, India
- Known for: Studies on applied optics
- Awards: 1985 Shanti Swarup Bhatnagar Prize; 2001 ICO Galileo Galilei Award
- Scientific career
- Fields: Optical physics
- Institutions: IIT Delhi; École Polytechnique Fédérale de Lausanne; Imperial College of Science and Technology

Kehar Singh (born 3 July 1941) is an Indian optical physicist and an emeritus fellow of the Indian Institute of Technology, Delhi. He is a former CLUSTER chair professor at Swiss Federal Institute of Technology in Lausanne and a former professor of IIT Delhi. He has also served as an academic visitor at Imperial College of Science and Technology, London.

Known for his research on applied optics, Singh is an elected fellow of Optical Society of America, SPIE, Indian National Academy of Engineering, Laser and Spectroscopy Society of India and Optical Society of India. The Council of Scientific and Industrial Research, the apex agency of the Government of India for scientific research, awarded him the Shanti Swarup Bhatnagar Prize for Science and Technology, one of the highest Indian science awards, for his contributions to physical sciences in 1985. He is also a recipient of the 2001 ICO Galileo Galilei Award of the International Union of Pure and Applied Physics.
