= Ashok Krishnamoorthy =

American electrical engineer

Ashok Krishnamoorthy is an electrical engineer from Oracle Labs in San Diego, California. He was named a Fellow of the Institute of Electrical and Electronics Engineers (IEEE) in 2012 for his contributions to optical interconnect devices and their system applications.
