= Journal of the European Optical Society: Rapid Publications =

Open-access journal

Journal of the European Optical Society-Rapid Publications
- Discipline: Optics
- Language: English
- Edited by: Sergei Popov, Silvia Soria

Publication details
- History: 2005-present
- Publisher: EDP Sciences on behalf of the European Optical Society
- Frequency: Biannually
- Open access: Yes
- License: CC BY 4.0
- Impact factor: 3.2 (2024)

Standard abbreviations
- ISO 4: J. Eur. Opt. Soc.: Rapid Publ.

Indexing
- ISSN: 1990-2573
- LCCN: 2009253000
- OCLC no.: 71271357

Links
- Journal homepage; Online archive

The Journal of the European Optical Society-Rapid Publications is a peer-reviewed open-access scientific journal published by EDP Sciences on behalf of the European Optical Society. According to Journal Citation Reports, its 2024 impact factor was 3.2.

The journal covers research in all areas of optical science and photonics. The editors-in-chief as of March 2023 are Sergei Popov (KTH Royal Institute of Technology) and Silvia Soria (IFAC-CNR Institute of Applied Physics, Italy).
