= Tatiana Budtova =

Russian researcher

- Born: 23 June 1963 (age 63)
- Education: Physical Faculty, Leningrad State University
- Occupation: Researcher

Tatiana Budtova (born 23 June 1963) is a chemical researcher. She works at MINES ParisTech and specialises in the chemical physics of polymers, particularly bio-based polymers and bio-based aerogels. In 2020, she was awarded the CNRS Silver Medal.

== Biography ==
Budtova graduated in 1987 from the Physical Faculty of Leningrad State University. In 1992, she obtained her PhD in the Institute of Macromolecular Compounds of the Russian Academy of Sciences, under the supervision of S. Y. Frenkel.

Budtova began collaborating with CEMEF in 1993 and subsequently obtained her habilitation at the University of Nice-Sophia-Antipolis / Ecole Nationale Supérieure des Mines de Paris, in 1999. In 2004, she joined CEMEF on a permanent basis, subsequently becoming director of the research group for bio-based polymers and composites. Between 2016 and 2020 she was a Finland Distinguished Professor (FiDiPro) at Aalto University, Finland.

Budtova's research focuses on the development of bio-based aerogels, polymer composites reinforced with natural fibres, polysaccharide, and polymer solutions and gels. Since 2015, she has served as one of the editors of the journal Carbohydrate Polymers.

== Bio-aerogels ==
The first bio-aerogels were made in the early 2000s. Budtova's flagship work to date has been based around the development of aerogels which can be manufactured without chemical synthesis, based on “ready-made” polymers found in nature. This idea was born in collaboration with PERSEE/Mines ParisTech. The core idea was to create truly bio aerogels, utilising the shared expertise of the two groups.

The first research project on bio-aerogels ("AeroCell"), which launched this area of research, was funded by the European Commission and co-ordinated by Lenzing, an Austrian company with expertise in cellulose fibres. In 2004, CEMEF and PERSEE submitted a Soleau envelope. At that time, this new material was referred to as “aerocellulose”. As a result of this collaboration and the knowledge generated, all bio-based aerogels are now called “bio-aerogels”

Between 2012 and 2014, Cyrielle Rudaz, working under Budtova's supervision, discovered that pectin aerogels are thermal super-insulating materials (with thermal conductivity lower than that of air). In 2016-17 two Masters students (Lucile Druel & Richard Bardl) working under her supervision, were awarded the prix "Innovation" by Maiz'Europ for their discovery that starch aerogels are also thermal super-insulating materials.

== Awards and honours ==
- 2014: Prix ADEME des Techniques Innovantes pour l'Environnement (together with Dr Cyrielle Rudaz and Dr Arnaud Demilecamps)
- 2015: Chevalier des Palmes académiques
- 2020: CNRS Silver Medal
