= Rajpal Singh Sirohi =

Indian optical physicist

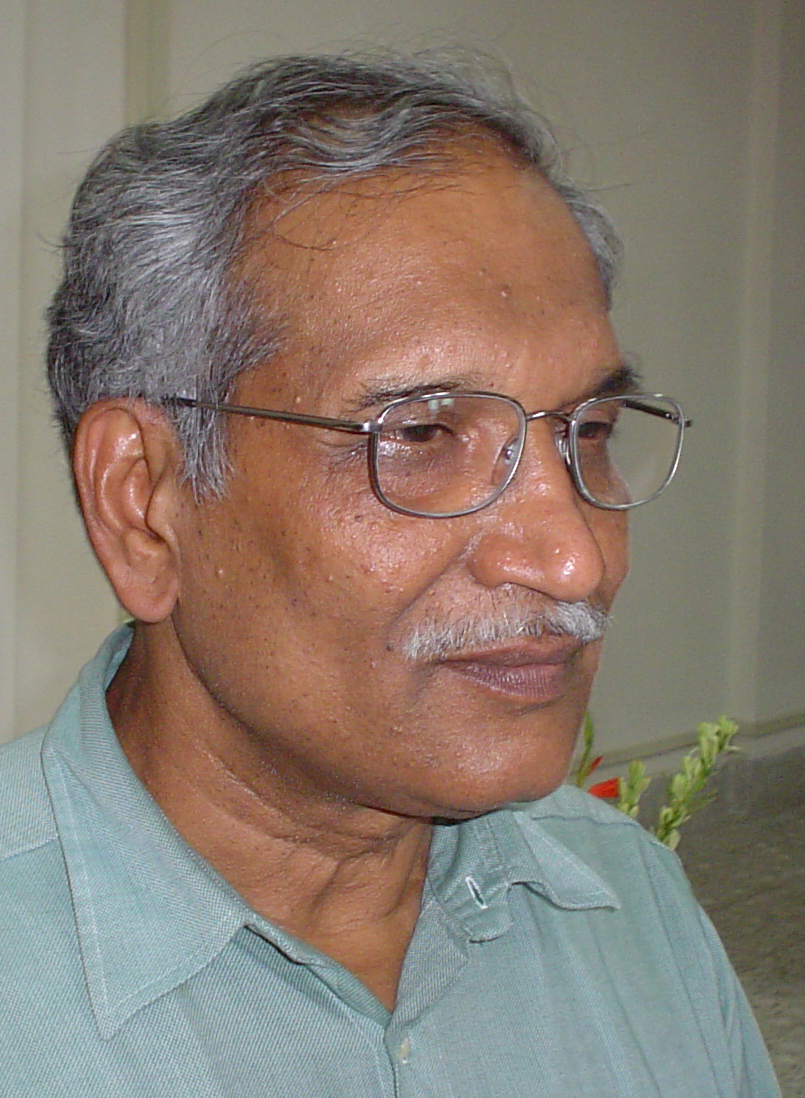
- Born: 7 April 1943 (age 83)
- Education: Meerut College (M.Sc.); Indian Institute of Technology Delhi (Ph.D.)
- Known for: Optical metrology
- Awards: Galileo Galilei Award (1995); Alexander von Humboldt Award (1995); Padma Shri (2004); Gabor Award (2009)
- Scientific career
- Fields: Applied optics, optical metrology
- Workplaces: Indian Institute of Technology Madras; Tezpur University

Rajpal Singh Sirohi (born 7 April 1943) is an Indian optics physicist, academic administrator, educator, and researcher in optical metrology. He is the former Director of IIT Delhi and Vice Chancellor of several universities. He is the Fellow of INAE, NASI, OSA, SPIE, OSI and ISoI. He has received numerous awards including Gabor Award of SPIE, Galileo Award of ICO. He is also the recipient of Padma Shri by Govt. of India. He is the author of about 430 papers and several books.

== Education ==
Rajpal Singh Sirohi was born in 1943 in village Sehra, District Bulandshahar, Uttar Pradesh, India in a farmer's family. He studied in village school until 3rd standard. He did his 4th and 5th standard education in a school at Bhawan Bahadur Nagar. Thereafter he joined the SB Inter College at Bhawan Bahadur Nagar and studied there until 12th standard. He completed B.Sc. from N.A.S. College, Meerut and M.Sc. (Physics) from Meerut College. He obtained two degrees (Post M.Sc. Diploma and Ph.D.) from IIT Delhi.

== Profession ==
He worked as Scientific Officer at Indian Institute of Science, Bangalore, India; Assistant Professor and Professor at Indian Institute of Technology Madras, India. He was visiting Professor at National University Singapore; Alexander von Humboldt Awardee at Oldenburg University Germany; Distinguished Scholar at Rose Hulman Institute of Technology, Terre Haute, Indiana USA; Chair Professor, Tezpur University, Assam, India. He held several administrative positions such as Director, IIT Delhi; Vice Chancellor, Barkatullah University, Bhopal; Vice-Chancellor, Shobhit University, Meerut; Vice Chancellor, Amity University, Jaipur; Vice-Chancellor, Invertis University, Bareilly. He was Chairman, BoG, NSIT, New Delhi and Chairman, GB, NCSM, Kolkata.

== Awards and honours ==
He is the recipient of the following awards:

=== National awards ===
- Amita De Memorial Award of the Optical Society of India (1998)
- Pt. Jawaharlal Nehru Award in Engineering & Technology (awarded in 2002) by MP Council of Science and Technology (2000)
- Dr. YT Thathachari Prestigious Award for Science by Thathachari Foundation, Mysore (2001)
- Giant's Gaurav Samman by Giant's International (2001)
- NAFEN's Annual Corporate Excellence Award (2001)
- Sir C. V. Raman Award: Physical Sciences by University Grants Commission (UGC) (2002)
- NRDC Technology Invention Award by National Research Development Corporation, New Delhi on 11 May, (2003)
- Centenarian Seva Ratna Award (awarded in February 2006) by The Centenarian Trust, Chennai (2004)
- Padma Shri, a National Civilian Award by Government of India (2004)
- Sir C. V. Raman Birth Centenary Award by Indian Science Congress Association, Kolkata (2005)
- UGC National Hari OM Ashram Trust Award - Homi J. Bhabha Award for Applied Sciences (awarded on 22 February 2010) by University Grants Commission (2005)
- Instrument Society of India Award 2007 on 24 October, (2007)
- Life-Time Achievement Award by Optical Society of India on 18 December 2007
- Distinguished Alumni Award by Indian Institute of Technology Delhi on 9 November, (2013)

=== International awards ===
- Humboldt Research Award by Alexander von Humboldt Foundation, Germany (1995)
- Galileo Galilei Award of International Commission for Optics (1995)
- 13th Khwarizmi International Award by Iranian Research Organization for Science and Technology (2000)
- Albert Einstein Silver Medal, UNESCO (2000)
- Holo-Knight, inducted into Order of Holo-Knights during the International Conference-Fringe05-at Stuttgart, Germany on 12 September, (2005)
- Gabor Award 2009 by SPIE (The International Society for Optical Engineering) USA on 7 April (2009)
- Vikram Award 2014 by SPIE (International Society for Optical Engineering) USA on 10 February, (2014)
