= Institut d'optique Graduate School =

French Grande École of the Paris-Saclay University

Coordinates: 48°42′50″N 2°12′12″E

- Other name: SupOptique
- Type: Grande école
- Established: 1917
- Parent institution: Paris-Saclay University
- Affiliations: ParisTech
- President: Elisabeth Giacobino
- Director: Rémi Carminati
- Faculty: 50
- Administrative staff: 200
- Students: 600 (400 in MScEng, 50 in MSc, 150 in PhD)
- Postgraduates: 450
- Doctoral students: 150
- Location: 2 avenue Augustin Fresnel, Palaiseau, Paris-Saclay (Palaiseau & Orsay), Saint-Etienne, Bordeaux, France
- Campus: Campus Paris-Saclay
- Website: www.institutoptique.fr/en

The Institut d'optique Graduate School ("Institute of optics"), nicknamed SupOptique or IOGS, is a graduate school of Paris-Saclay University and ParisTech.

== History ==
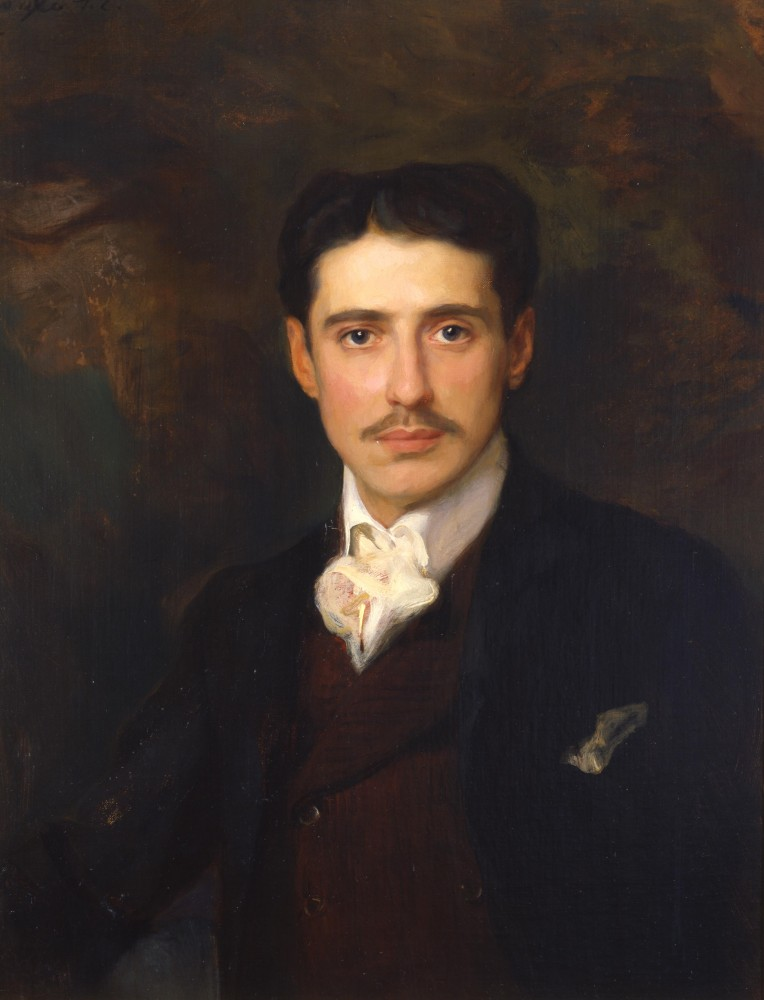
Armand de Gramont

Armand de Gramont, a rich industrialist and friend of Marcel Proust, was the man who had the idea to create the Institut d'Optique. In 1916, Gramont and Henri Chrétien (a French astronomer) were working together at the French Technical Aeronautics Section. Chrétien was working at the time on calculations for optical instruments. They both decided to create the project of building an institute dedicated to teaching optics. That same year, Gramont became part of a committee that examined inventions that could interest the ministry of Defense. That is where he met Charles Fabry, who had previously become famous thanks to his experimental demonstration of the existence of the ozone layer in the atmosphere. On October 21, 1916, Gramont had lunch with four government ministers. As a result, a new committee was formed, in charge of establishing the project. During the month of November 1917, the first board meeting was held.

The École supérieure d'optique (ESO) was opened in 1920, as part of the Institut d'optique théorique et appliquée, aiming to train engineers and cadres for the French optics industry. It is consequently the oldest institution of higher education and research in optics in the world and the most important in terms of annual number of graduates.

The Institut d'optique Graduate School provides an education of high scientific level, especially for former students from the French Classe préparatoire aux grandes écoles. It trains engineers to be, in industry and research, the actors of the development of optics in many areas such as telecommunications, biology, energy, materials, nanotechnologies, and aerospace engineering. It trains also researchers and teachers in the fields of optics and physics. Through the Institut d'optique théorique et appliquée, it participates at the world level to the promotion of knowledge and to the development of new techniques in optics.

Since September 2006, the set constituted by the École supérieure d'optique and the Institut d'optique théorique et appliquée has been designated by the names Institut d'optique Graduate School or Institut d'optique.

== Academics ==
A number of noted French optical scientists have been associated with SupOptique, including Henri Chrétien, Charles Fabry, André Maréchal, and Alain Aspect.

As of 2006 the school had 50 permanent faculty members (teachers, teacher-researchers and researchers), 241 students in the ESO engineering diploma programme, 15 students in the national research master programme (some of them matriculated in the Paris XI University or another institution) and 40 doctoral students (matriculated in the Paris XI).

== Research ==
=== Research teams and activities ===
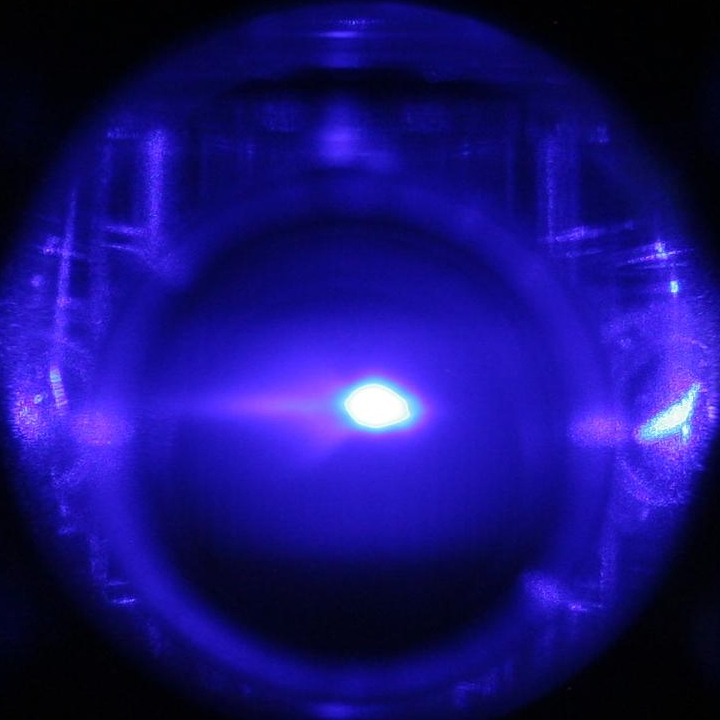
Cloud of strontium atoms at millikelvin temperatures in a magneto-optical trap.

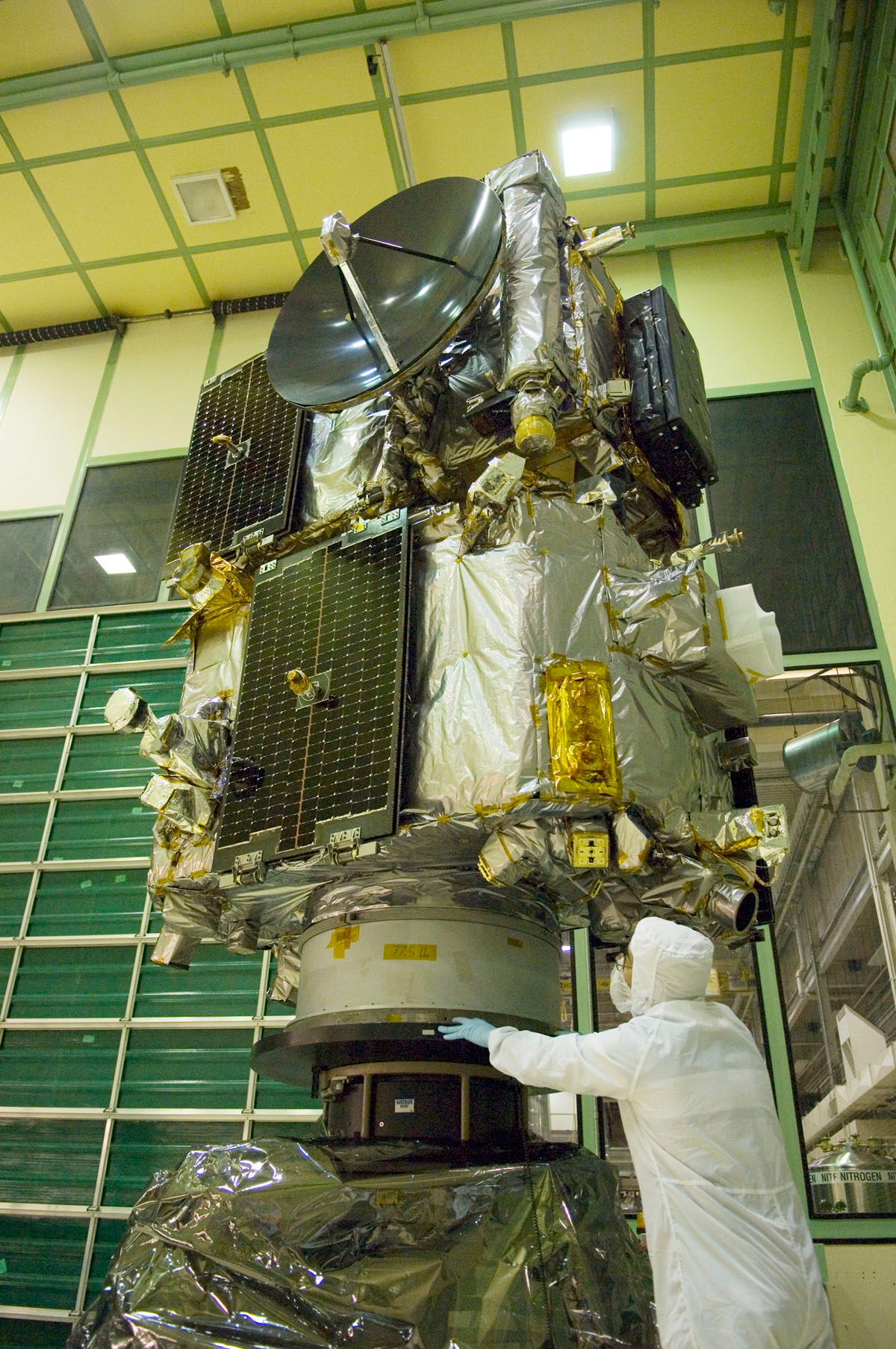
STEREO satellite.

Most research groups are part of the Charles Fabry Laboratory since 1998, which is associated to the CNRS and the Université Paris-Sud. Patrick Georges is the director of the laboratory. In 2022, it is composed of 64 permanent staff and 67 PhD students.

In 2022, the different research groups of the laboratory are:

- "Quantum Gases" group (head: Alain Aspect, Christoph Westbrook, Denis Boiron, Isabelle Bouchoule): study of ultra-cold atomic gases (He*, Rb, K, Sr) (atom optics, Bose-Hubbard systems in 2D and 3D with individual atom detection, condensates mixtures with tunable interactions, 3D Anderson localization, 1D Bose gases on atom chip). The first metastable helium (He*) Bose-Einstein condensate was produced in 2001.
- "Quantum optics" group (head: Philippe Grangier, Antoine Browaeys, Rosa Tualle-Brouri): foundations of quantum mechanics, quantum communications and cryptography, non-classical states generation and manipulation, Rydberg atoms tweezers arrays for quantum simulation and computing (Rb), collective effects in light-atoms interactions (Rb, Dy). The group pioneered the trapping and manipulation of single neutral Rydberg atoms in optical tweezers, and the assembling of configurable arrays of interacting Rydberg atoms.
- "Imaging and Information" group (head: Caroline Kulcsár & François Goudail): digital processing, adaptative optics, polarimetric imaging, co-design of imaging systems
- "Nanophotonics & Electromagnetism" group (head: Henri Benisty & Philippe Lalanne): nano-optics devices and metasurfaces, plasmonics and quantum nanophotonics, thermoplasmonics
- Laser group (head: Patrick Georges, Frédéric Druon): ultrashort sources, semiconductor lasers, LED pumping, laser systems
- Biophotonics group (head: Michael Canva, Nathalie Westbrook): in vivo functional imagery, OCT imagery, kinetics of individual biomolecules, biochips, optical tweezers
- XUV optics group and fabrication lab (head: Franck Delmotte): design and fabrication of high-precision XUV optics for EUV telescopes, soft X-ray microscopy, plasma diagnosis, attosecond physics... The mirrors used for the STEREO mission (NASA project) and for the Solar Orbiter's EUI instrument were made at Institut d'Optique.
- Non-linear photonics group (head: Philippe Delaye)
