= Giuliano Toraldo di Francia =

Italian physicist

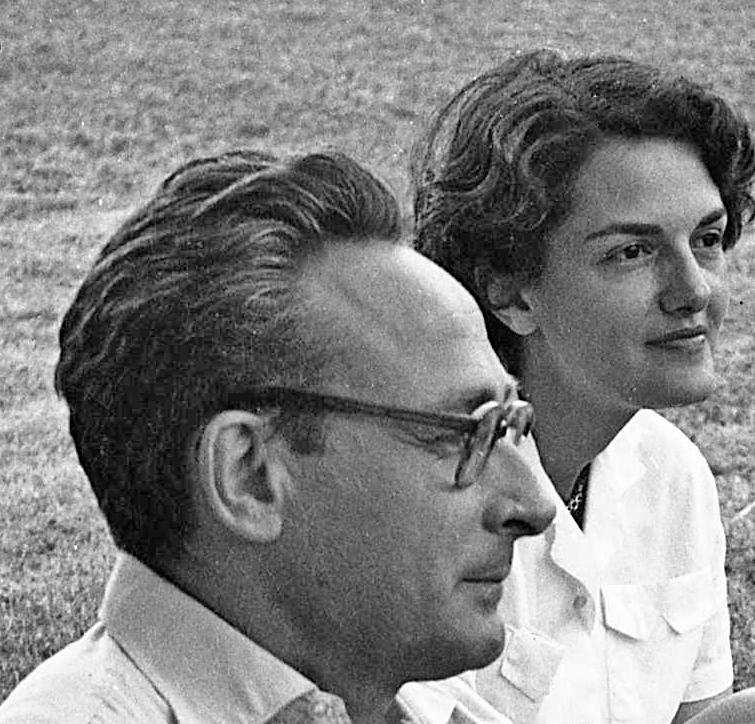
Giuliano Toraldo di Francia Giuliano Toraldo and Geraldine Zetzel
- Born: September 17, 1916; Florence, Italy
- Died: April 26, 2011 (aged 94); Florence, Italy
- Citizenship: Italy
- Education: University of Florence
- Known for: Evanescent waves Super-resolution
- Spouse: Maria Luisa Dalla Chiara
- Awards: Thomas Young Medal and Prize (1969)
- Scientific career
- Fields: Physics
- Workplaces: University of Florence; National Institute of Optics
- Academic advisors: Nello Carrara

Giuliano Toraldo di Francia (September 17, 1916 – April 26, 2011) was an Italian physicist and philosopher, known mainly for his experimental and theoretical studies in optics.

== Biography ==
He was the son of the geographer and general Orazio Toraldo di Francia. After his high school studies he graduated in physics at the University of Florence in 1940 with Nello Carrara, of whom he soon became assistant at the Institute of Physics. At the same time, he carried out research activities at the National Institute of Optics in Arcetri, then directed by Vasco Ronchi. After the war, he worked at the Ducati optical research center in Bologna until 1951 when he became extraordinary professor of electromagnetic waves at the University of Florence, then full professor of the same discipline in 1954 at the National Institute of Optics (Arcetri), after two years of research and teaching at the University of Rochester. In 1958, he passed to the University of Florence, as a professor of optics holding a chair specially created for him. At the same time, he collaborated with the Microwave Research Institute of Florence, founded by Nello Carrara in 1946. In the 1970s, he founded and directed both the Research Institute on electromagnetic waves, now the Institute of Applied Physics of the CNR, and the Institute of Quantum Electronics (also part of the CNR). He became full professor at the University of Florence until 1991, the year of his retirement. He was appointed professor emeritus in 1992.

In the 1950s he dealt with microwave optics and spectroscopy. In the early 1960s, he transferred the laser research that had started in the US to Italy. After meeting Claude Shannon during his stay in Rochester, he also transferred concepts from Shannon's information theory to optics.

He succeeded in experimentally demonstrating the existence of evanescent electromagnetic waves generated by diffraction using microwave radiation. In 1941 he anticipated the principles of holography by Dennis Gabor (principles of inverse interference). Due to the war, however, his work did not become internationally known. He introduced the concept of super-resolution (Toraldo filter).

In 1969 he received the Young Medal. From 1968 to 1973 he was President of the Italian Physical Society, becoming its Honorary President in 2005 and receiving its gold medal in the same year. He was editor of the journal Nuovo Cimento and during this time he campaigned for internationalization and publication in English.

Toraldo di Francia is one of the translators of Richard Feynman's lectures on physics into Italian. He is also known as a philosopher of science and was President of the Italian Society for Logic and Philosophy of Science. He was also an expert on Dante Alighieri, founded a forum for problems of war and peace and was active in a society for the scientific investigation of paranormal phenomena (CICAP). He was director of the music school in Fiesole, where he also directed and wrote the libretto for an opera.

The architect Cristiano Toraldo di Francia was his son.
