= European Optical Society =

Scientific organisation

The European Optical Society (EOS) is a European organisation for the development of the science of optics, founded in 1991. Membership is open to national optical societies, individuals, companies, organisations, educational institutions, and learned and professional societies. EOS runs international conferences, lobbies for optical science at European level, offers a focus for collecting and disseminating knowledge in the field, and publishes the online Journal of the European Optical Society: Rapid Publications (JEOS:RP).

== History ==
Optics in Europe was represented by the European Optical Committee (EOC) until 1984, when the EOC joined the European Physical Society (EPS) to create an Optics Division. Two years later the national optical societies of several European countries founded the European Federation for Applied Optics – Europtica – which was officially registered in Paris in 1987. In December 1986 a Memorandum of Understanding (MOU) was signed between EPS (the legal representative of the Optics Division), Europtica, and SPIE, in which the three parties agreed to organise jointly one major annual optics meeting in Europe. This MOU initiated the ECO series of meetings, which were managed by the French organisation Europtica Services International Communications. The experience with these conferences demonstrated the need for effective organisation of optical activities in Europe.

In view of this need, the Board of the Optics Division of EPS unanimously voted in March 1990 to open negotiations with Europtica in order to found the European Optical Society (EOS). EOS was founded on 24 May 1991.

== Aims and mission ==
In the view of the society, optics as a science, technology, and base for industry, consumer goods, and health care makes a significant contribution to society and has a great potential for further development. The purpose of the society is to contribute to progress in optics and related sciences, and to promote their applications at the European and international levels, by bringing together individuals and legal entities involved in these disciplines and their applications.

The EOS serves as the joint forum for all individuals, companies, organisations, educational institutions, and learned and professional societies, who recognise the opportunity and challenge that a common European base provides for the development of optics in its broadest sense. With the support of the national optical societies of many European countries, EOS seeks to provide a powerful joint representation for optics in Europe.

=== Promotion of optics ===
The EOS works to promote optics and related sciences in cooperation with industry and research by establishing a joint information platform, and by forming a national, European and international lobby for optics as the enabling technology of the 21st century, including seeking to influence European R&D policy. It coordinates optics conferences and publications in Europe; supports the dissemination of knowledge about the use and value of optics and related sciences to the general public, industry, media, and on the political level; and acts as the forum for the European professional and learned societies for the collection and dissemination of information, for the coordination of policies, and for joint ventures.

=== Enhancing professional status ===
The EOS works to enhance the professional standing of individuals working in optics. It fosters the exchange of students and professionals, and promotes employment in optics throughout Europe. It promotes European educational standards in optics in education, training, and examination at all levels.

== Main activities ==
The EOS organises topical meetings, workshops and conferences, and endorsement of other scientific events, and runs focus groups for various application fields. It publishes the electronic journal JEOS:RP, and other electronic and printed newsletters, as well as offering a virtual platform for the European optics and photonics community on its website. It represents the optics and photonics community on the European-level technology platform Photonics21. Finally, it awards the annual EOS Prize and the ‘EOS Early Career Awards’ for young photonics innovators.

== Membership ==
The EOS today has more than 4,500 societal, corporate, individual, associate and student members from all over Europe and worldwide.

=== Modes of membership ===
- Societal membership (national optical societies)
- Individual membership, directly or through an EOS Branch
- Student membership
- Associate membership through an EOS-affiliated society
- Corporate membership, directly or through an EOS Branch or an EOS-affiliated society

=== Societal members ===
17 national optical societies are members: 9 are EOS Branches, and 8 are EOS Affiliated Societies.

EOS Branches include DGaO (Germany), Photonics Finland (Finland), SFO (France), IOP Optical Group (UK and Ireland), SSOM (Switzerland), PhotonicSweden (Sweden), SIOF (Italy), HOS (Hungary), and LOS (Latvia).

EOS Affiliated Societies include NFS (Norway), PromOptica (Belgium), SEDOPTICA (Spain), SPOF (Portugal), PPS-OD (Poland), CSSF (Czech Republic and Slovakia), WLT (Germany), and USPAO (Ukraine).

=== Corporate members ===
9 companies are corporate members of the EOS.

== Publications ==
The EOS publishes the Journal of the European Optical Society–Rapid Publications (JEOS–RP), covering a wide range of research and education in optics and photonics.
