= Optica Fellow =

Fellow of the Optical Society

The Optica Fellow is a membership designation of Optica (formerly known as The Optical Society (OSA)) that denotes distinguished scientific accomplishment. The bylaws of this society only allow 10% of its membership to be designated as an Optica Fellow. The Optica Fellow requires peer group nomination.

== The nominee ==
An Optica member can only become an Optica Fellow when nominated by a peer group of other current Optica Fellows. Review of the nomination is then passed to the Optica Fellow Members Committee. This committee then nominates the candidate to the Board of Directors on an annual basis. Finally, the purpose of this award is to designate a member as one who has "made significant contributions to the advancement of optics".

== The process ==
The process includes actively identifying possible candidates who might qualify for this award. Contributing factors for qualification are diverse within the optics community. These factors include significant or distinguishing scientific accomplishments, technical achievements, inventions, technical innovations, technical management, and demonstration of leadership. The fields of such achievement are significant instrument technique, and measurement technique (including original software). Other fields include distinguished sustained accomplishments in engineering, education, and service to the global optics community (including photonics and Optica). Other factors may also include a record of significant publications, patents, and invited review papers for the various levels of meetings related to the covered fields.

Letters of recommendation are solicited from outside the nominee's field of work. Finally references from four people familiar with the nominee's work are required. Once all the relevant information has been considered, the Optica Fellow Members Committee votes on the applications and those selected are forwarded to the Board of Directors.

== Limited list of Optica Fellows ==
Full list available available on

- Richard L. Abrams
- Robert Alfano
- Andrea Armani
- Arthur Ashkin
- Imrana Ashraf
- Thomas M. Baer
- Xiaoyi Bao
- Patricia Bath
- Polina Bayvel
- Gisele Bennett
- Jean M. Bennett
- Keren Bergman
- Kostadinka Bizheva
- Alexandra Boltasseva
- Gabriella Bosco
- Robert W. Boyd
- William B. Bridges
- Philip H. Bucksbaum
- Robert L. Byer
- Melanie Campbell
- Yvette Cauchois
- H. John Caulfield
- Constance J. Chang-Hasnain
- Steven Chu
- Claude Cohen-Tannoudji
- A. Catrina Coleman
- Anna Consortini
- Mini Das
- Anthony J. DeMaria
- Christopher Dainty
- Silvano Donati
- Judith F. Donnelly
- F. J. Duarte
- Joseph H. Eberly
- Benjamin Eggleton
- Roger W. Falcone
- Michael S. Feld
- Janet S. Fender
- Vivian Ferry
- Mable Fok
- Elsa M. Garmire
- Greg Gbur
- Irene Georgakoudi
- Ursula Gibson
- Joseph W. Goodman
- James P. Gordon
- Vivek Goyal
- Norma Graham
- Claire Gu
- Tingyi Gu
- Naomi Halas
- John L. Hall
- Theodor W. Hänsch
- James S. Harris
- S. E. Harris
- Tayyaba Hasan
- Elizabeth Hillman
- Susan Houde-Walter
- John Howard
- Diana Huffaker
- Herbert E. Ives
- Janet Jackel
- Deborah Jackson
- Chennupati Jagadish
- Dorothea Jameson
- Mona Jarrahi
- Mary Lou Jepsen
- Anthony M. Johnson
- Kristina M. Johnson
- Nan Marie Jokerst
- Ursula Keller
- Hilda Conrady Kingslake
- Yuri S. Kivshar
- Olga Kocharovskaya
- Leslie Kolodziejski
- Willis E. Lamb
- Alexandra Landsman
- Sophie LaRochelle
- Melvin Lax
- Marina Leite
- Anne L'Huillier
- Odile Liboiron-Ladouceur
- Michal Lipson
- Cuicui Lu
- David MacAdam
- Christi Madsen
- Theodore Maiman
- Leonard Mandel
- Susana Marcos Celestino
- Laura Marcu
- Antigone Marino
- Delphine Marris-Morini
- John C. Mather
- Nergis Mavalvala
- Eric Mazur
- Noureddine Melikechi
- Kaoru Minoshima
- Amy Mullin
- Margaret Murnane
- Lorenzo M. Narducci
- Síle Nic Chormaic
- Perley G. Nutting
- Ellen Ochoa
- Teri W. Odom
- Malini Olivo
- B. J. Orr
- Francesca Parmigiani
- Nimmi Ramanujam
- Manijeh Razeghi
- Margaret Reid
- James A. Piper
- William Daniel Phillips
- Gertrude Rand
- Rebecca Richards-Kortum
- Monika Ritsch-Marte
- Clara Rivero-Baleine
- Jannick Rolland
- Halina Rubinsztein-Dunlop
- Philip Russell
- Caesar Saloma
- Arthur Leonard Schawlow
- Marlan Scully
- Francis Sears
- Vladimir Shalaev
- Anthony E. Siegman
- Christine Silberhorn
- William T. Silfvast
- Laura C. Sinclair
- William M. Sinton
- Warren J. Smith
- Peter P. Sorokin
- Irina Sorokina
- Costas Soukoulis
- Donna Strickland
- Boris P. Stoicheff
- Marija Strojnik Scholl
- John D. Strong
- Judith Su
- Eric Swanson
- Davida Teller
- Charles Hard Townes
- Victor Twersky
- Yurii Vlasov
- Jelena Vučković
- Laura Waller
- Daniel Frank Walls
- Ian Walmsley
- Colin Webb
- Carl Wieman
- Alan E. Willner
- David J. Wineland
- Emil Wolf
- Lin Wu
- Ling-An Wu
- Eli Yablonovitch
- Amnon Yariv
- Xiaoke Yi
- Louise Gray Young
- María Yzuel
- Nikolay Zheludev
- Xin Zhang
- Vassilia Zorba
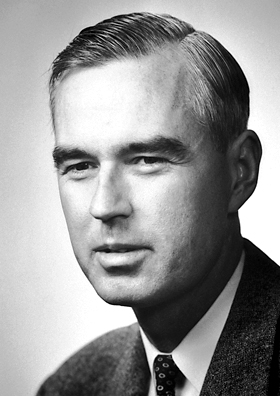
Willis E. Lamb

Charles Hard Townes

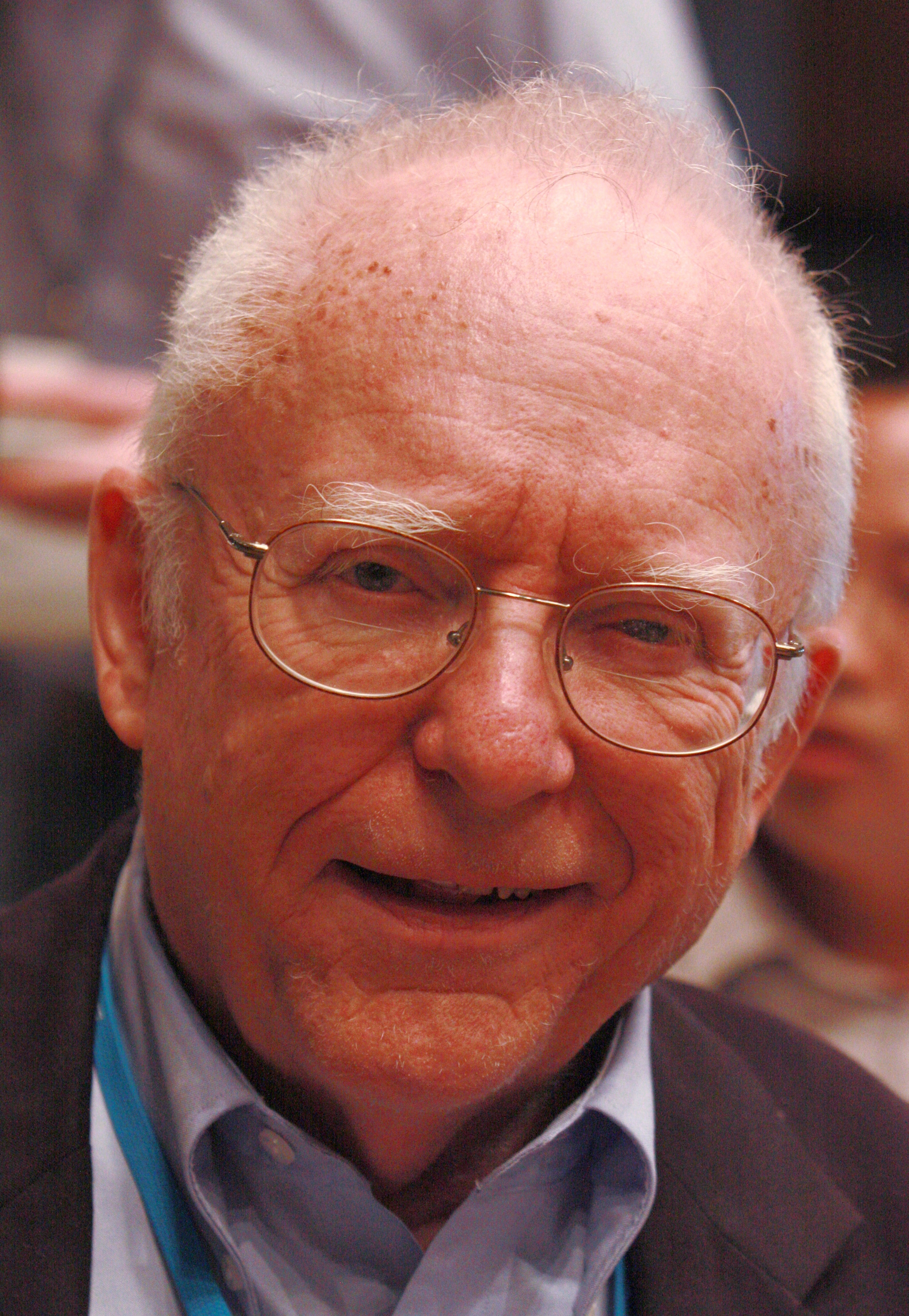
John L. Hall

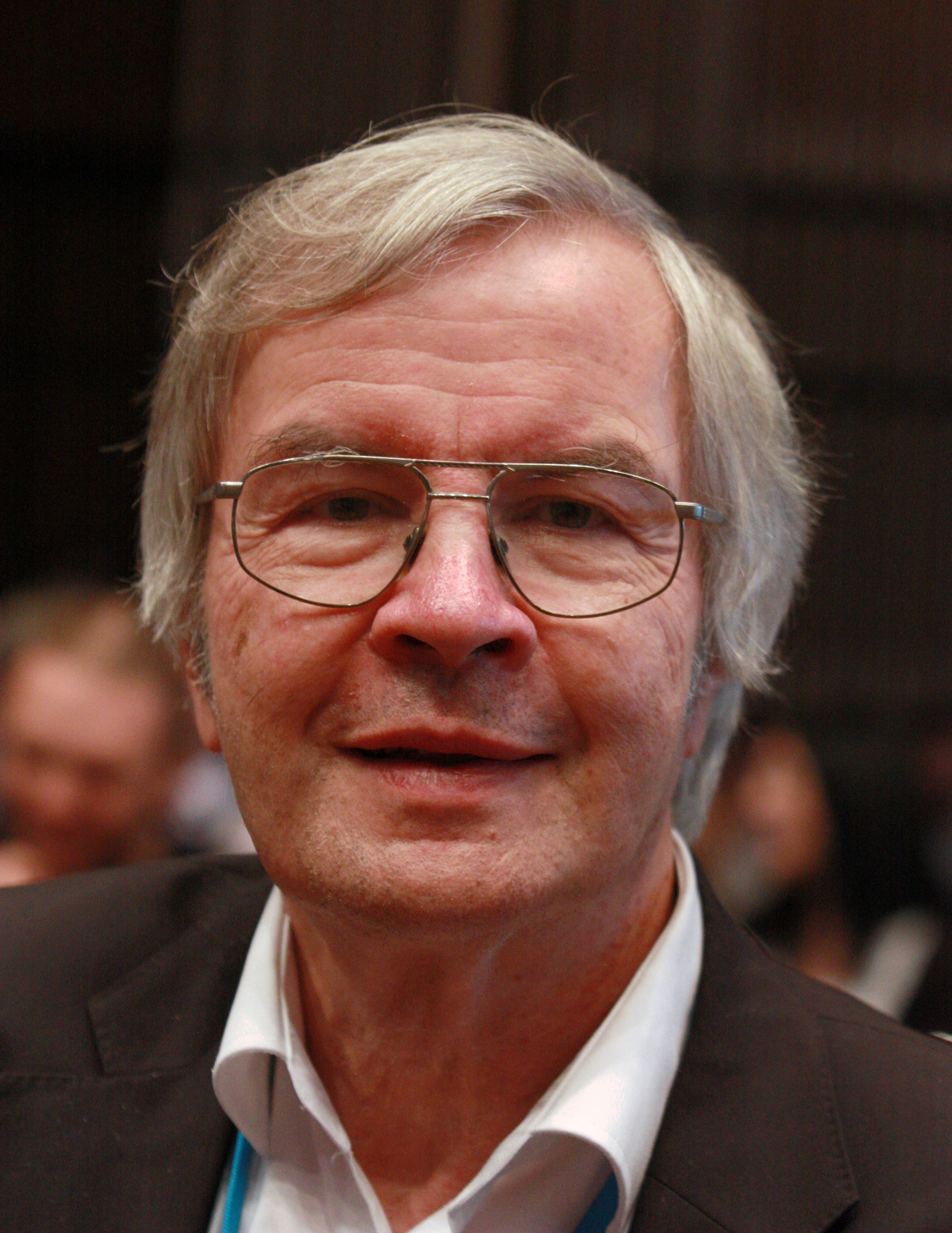
Theodor W. Hänsch

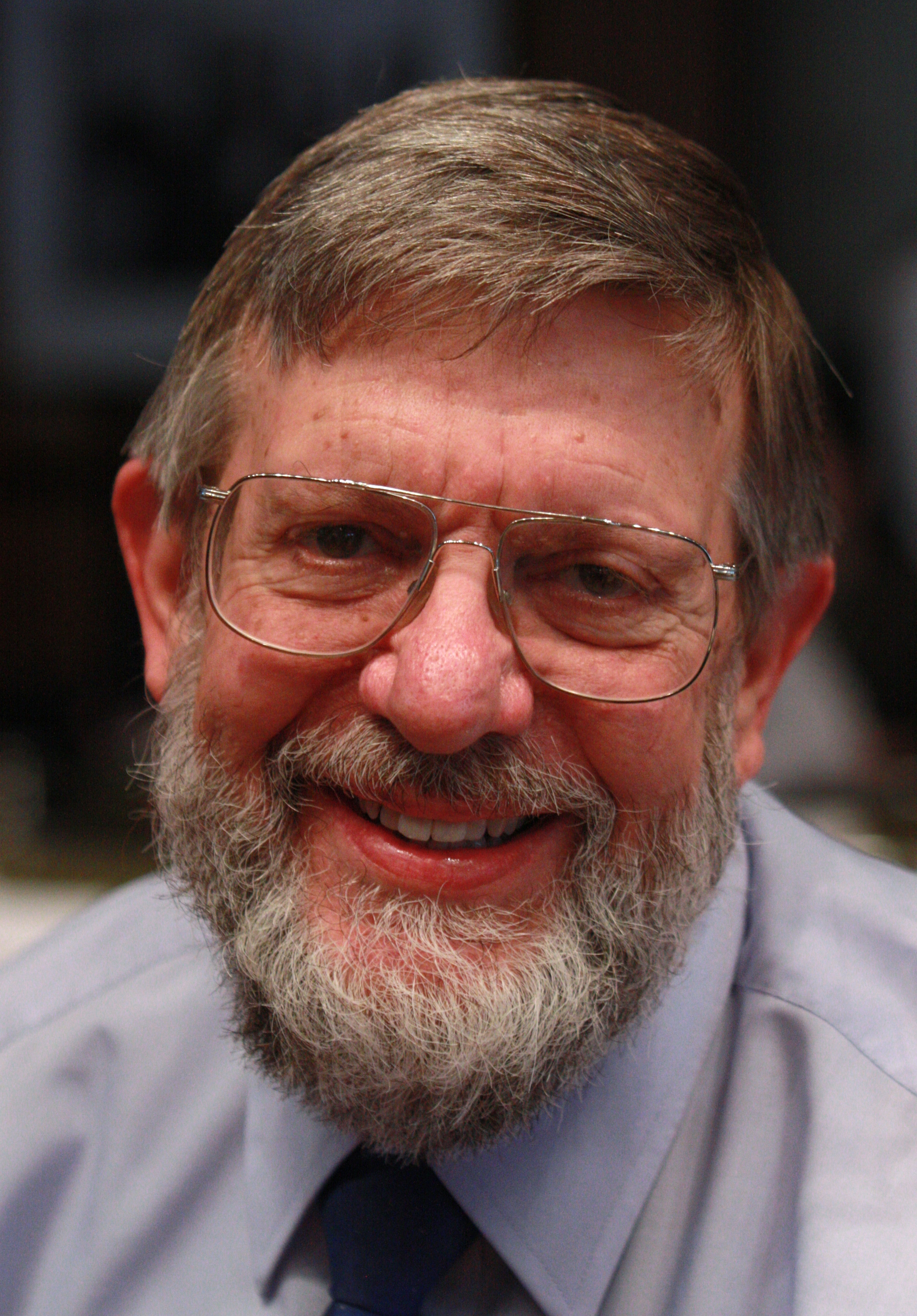
William D. Phillips

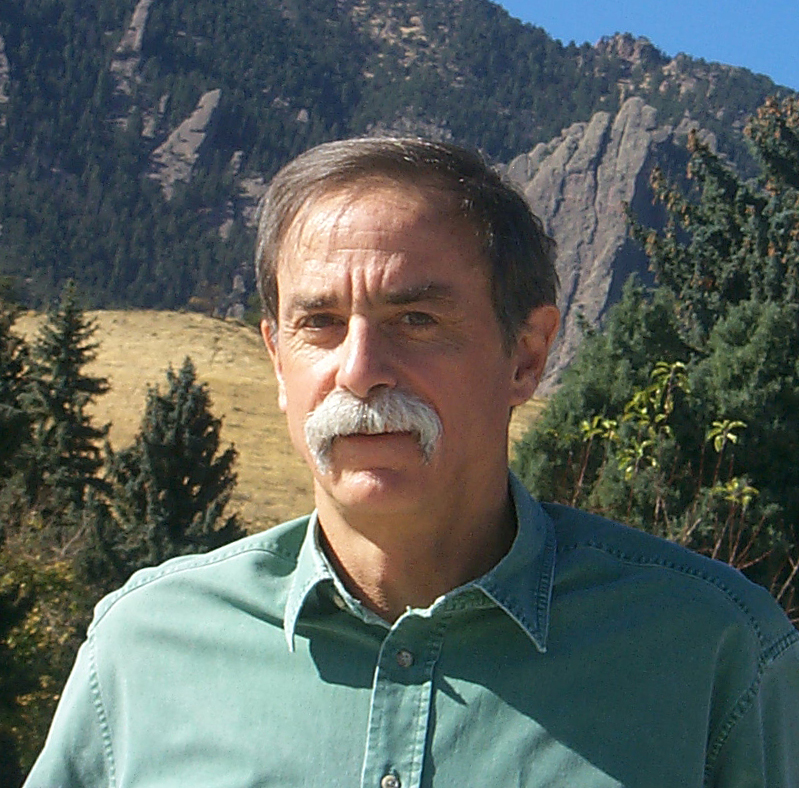
David J. Wineland

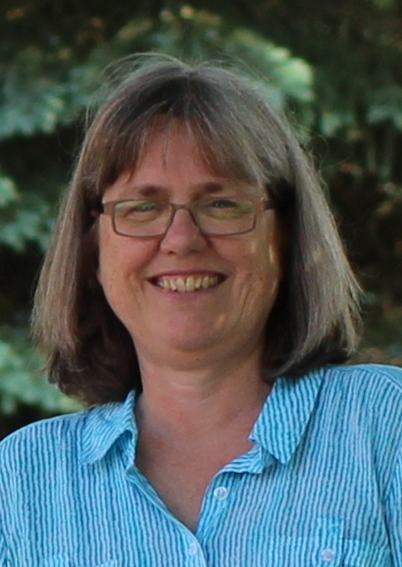
Donna Strickland
