= Lin Wu (disambiguation) =

Lin Wu or Wu Lin may refer to:

== Family name Lin ==
- Lin Wu (born 1962), Chinese politician

== Family name Wu ==
- Lin Wu (physicist), Singaporean researcher
- Wu Lin (born 1909), Chinese politician
- Wu Lin, graphic novelist, author of A Jewish Girl in Shanghai

== See also ==
- Wu-lin, historical fictional community of wuxia martial artists
