= Chemosensor =

Chemosensor may refer to:

- Chemoreceptor, a specialized sensory receptor cell which transduces (responds to) a chemical substance
- Molecular sensor, a molecule that interacts with an analyte to produce a detectable change
