= Nan Marie Jokerst =

American engineer

- Education: Creighton University (BSc); University of Southern California (MSEE, PhD)
- Known for: Photonics; Microsystems; Metamaterials
- Awards: IEEE Fellow (2003); Fellow of the Optical Society (2001); Presidential Young Investigator Award (1990)
- Scientific career
- Fields: Electrical Engineering; Optics; Semiconductors
- Institutions: Duke University
- Thesis: Nonlinear optical absorption in single heterostructure Schottky barrier epitaxial structures (1989)
- Doctoral advisor: Elsa M. Garmire
- Website: University website

Nan Marie Jokerst is an American professor of Electrical and Computer Engineering at Duke University known for her work integrating optoelectronics with semiconductor substrates in order to create portable environmental and medical sensors. She is a Fellow of the Optical Society and Fellow of the Institute of Electrical and Electronics Engineers.

Since 2004, Jokerst has been J. A. Jones Distinguished Professor at Duke University. Jokerst previously served as faculty in the School of Electrical and Computer Engineering at Georgia Institute of Technology as the Joseph M. Pettit Professor of Optoelectronics.

== Education ==
- BS in Mathematics, Creighton University, 1982
- BS in Physics, Creighton University, 1982
- MSEE in Electrical Engineering, University of Southern California, 1984
- PhD in Electrical Engineering, University of Southern California, 1989

== Awards ==
- NSF Presidential Young Investigator Award, 1990
- IEEE Third Millennium Medal, 2000
- Fellow of the Optical Society, 2001
- IEEE Education Society Harris B. Rigas Medal, 2002
- IEEE Fellow, 2003
- Alumni in Academia Award for the University of Southern California Viterbi School of Engineering, 2006
