= Ladouceur =

Ladouceur (French for '[the] sweetness'; pronounced [ladusœʁ]) is a surname that may refer to:

- Ben Ladouceur (born 1987), Canadian writer
- Bob Ladouceur (born 1954), American football coach
- Dan Ladouceur (born 1973), former lacrosse player
- Fernand Ladouceur (1925–1999), Progressive Conservative party member of the Canadian House of Commons
- Jacques LaDouceur (born 1959), retired Haitian-American soccer forward
- L. P. Ladouceur (born 1981), Canadian-born American football player
- Randy Ladouceur (born 1960), current assistant coach of the Montreal Canadiens
- Odile Liboiron-Ladouceur, Canadian photonics engineering professor

== See also ==
- R. v. Ladouceur, 1 S.C.R. 1257 is a leading decision of the Supreme Court of Canada on the constitutionality of random police traffic checks
