= Liboiron =

Liboiron is a surname. Notable people with the surname include:

- Landon Liboiron (born 1991), Canadian actor
- Odile Liboiron-Ladouceur, Canadian photonics engineering professor
- Max Liboiron, Canadian social geographer and scholar of pollution
