= Parmigiani (disambiguation) =

Parmigiani Fleurier is a Swiss watchmaking company. Parmigiani may also refer to:

- Parmigiani language, a dialect spoken in the Italian Province of Parma
- Parmigiani (surname), multiple people
