= Alexandra Landsman =

American physicist

Alexandra Sasha Landsman is an American physicist specializing in ultrafast interactions of light with matter and in strong interactions. She is a professor of physics at the Ohio State University, and a member of the Ohio State Institute for Optical Science.

== Education and career ==
Landsman majored in physics at Dartmouth College, graduating in 1998. She completed a Ph.D. in plasma physics in 2005, at Princeton University. Her dissertation, Single ion dynamics inside magnetic field-reversed configuration, was supervised by Samuel A. Cohen. Next, she became a National Research Council Postdoctoral Fellow in Washington, D.C. from 2005 to 2008.

From 2008 to 2009 she held a tenure-track assistant professorship at James Madison University, but in 2010 she left the US to become a research scientist in physics at ETH Zurich in Switzerland from 2010 to 2015, and a group leader in the Max Planck Institute for the Physics of Complex Systems in Dresden, Germany from 2015 to 2019.

In 2019 she returned to the US as an associate professor at the Ohio State University, where she is now a full professor.

== Recognition ==
Landsman was elected as an Optica Fellow, in the 2027 class of fellows, "for seminal theoretical contributions to strong-field ionization, tunneling-time physics, and attosecond delays, bridging experiment and theory for atoms, molecules, and solids".
