= Parmigiani (surname) =

Parmigiani is an Italian surname. Notable people with the surname include:

- Francesca Parmigiani, Italian optical engineer
- Fulvio Parmigiani, Italian physicist
- Giovanni Parmigiani, Italian statistician
- Michel Parmigiani, founder of Swiss watchmaker Parmigiani Fleurier
