= Ivan Dryer =

- Born: March 7, 1939; United States
- Died: July 27, 2017 (aged 78); United States
- Occupations: Visual music artist, filmmaker
- Known for: Laserium

Ivan Dryer (March 7, 1939 – July 27, 2017) is generally considered to be the father of the commercial laser light show industry. He is the founder of the world's first continuously running laser entertainment, known as Laserium.

== Biography ==
Dryer was a filmmaker in the early 1970s. On one project, he worked with Dr. Elsa Garmire, a California Institute of Technology physicist interested in laser light art. (She had previously worked with other artists on special event laser shows.) Dryer was disappointed because the resulting film, LaserImage, did not have the pure color and shimmer of laser light.

Dryer had the idea of bringing the Caltech laser to Los Angeles' Griffith Observatory. He, Garmire and Dale Pelton formed Laser Images, Inc. to create Laserium laser light shows to be presented in planetariums. ("Laserium" is a registered trademark for the company's laser light shows.)

The first Laserium show opened to the public on November 19, 1973. It is thought to be the first on-going laser show that was not part of a special or one-time event. Laser imagery spread from planetariums to become more common at other venues such as concerts and corporate shows.

Laserium brand laser shows went on to be played in 46 cities in North America, including Los Angeles, San Francisco, San Diego, New York, Miami, Denver, St. Louis, Seattle, Vancouver, and Toronto, as well as Paris, London and Tokyo. The shows were viewed by over 20 million people. According to the company, Laserium was the longest running theatrical attraction in the history of Los Angeles. The Los Angeles show continued until 2002, a run of 28 years. Laserium continues today in special events and on tour.

In 1989, Dryer received the first ILDA Career Achievement Award from the International Laser Display Association. Dryer's company Laser Images won 43 ILDA Awards for artistic and technical excellence, in the years between 1988 and 2000. Dryer also served as ILDA's president from November 1990 to November 1992.

In 2013, Dryer received the first IMERSA Lifetime Achievement Award from the Immersive Media Entertainment, Research, Science and Arts association. IMERSA noted, In 2017, ILDA declared Dryer's birthdate, March 7, to be an annual event called "International Laserist Day".
