= Marina Leite =

Brazilian-American materials scientist

Marina S. Leite is a materials scientist whose research investigates novel materials with photovoltaic and plasmonic properties and their use in solar cells and optoelectronics. Educated in Brazil, she works in the United States as a professor in the Department of Materials Science and Engineering at the University of California, Davis.

== Education and career ==
Leite is the daughter of two professors, a mathematician and a physicist; her sister became a professor of chemical engineering. She received a bachelor's degree in chemistry at the Federal University of Pernambuco, and a Ph.D. in physics from the State University of Campinas, in 2007; her doctoral study also included visits to the Max Planck Institute for Solid State Research in Germany and the Eindhoven University of Technology in the Netherlands.

She was a postdoctoral researcher at the California Institute of Technology from 2008 to 2011. Then, she worked for two years at NIST before becoming a faculty member at the University of Maryland, College Park. She was tenured there as an associate professor before moving to the University of California, Davis, where she is a full professor.

== Recognition ==
In 2014, the Maryland Academy of Sciences named Leite as Maryland Outstanding Young Scientist. She was the 2016 Ovshinsky Sustainable Energy Fellow of the American Physical Society.

In 2025, she was elected as a Fellow of SPIE, and as an Optica Fellow, "for contributions to transient photonics and optical properties of metal alloys, representing a significant advancement in engineering and science research".
