= Xiaoke Yi =

Singaporean-Australian microwave engineer

Xiaoke Yi is a Singaporean and Australian microwave engineer whose research concerns photonics at microwave frequencies, including photonic integrated circuits, microwave photonic signal processing, microwave imaging, microwave chemistry sensors, optical artificial neural networks, and the use silicon carbide in microwave integrated circuits. She is a professor in the School of Electrical and Computer Engineering at the University of Sydney, where she directs the Photonics Research Group and is affiliated with the Net Zero Institute and Nano Institute.

== Education and career ==
Yi has a 2004 Ph.D. from Nanyang Technological University in Singapore. She became a research fellow at the University of Sydney in 2003. Continuing at the University of Sydney, she became a lecturer in 2006, and was promoted to senior lecturer in 2010. She was named a QE II Fellow in 2011, and has been a full professor since 2017.

== Recognition ==
In 2017, Yi was one of three Australian engineers recognized in the manufacturing and automation category of the Engineers Australia Most Innovative Engineers awards.

Yi was named as a Fellow of the Royal Society of New South Wales in 2021. She was named as a 2026 Fellow of Optica, "for outstanding and sustained contributions in microwave photonic signal processing and sensing".
