= Síle Nic Chormaic =

Irish physicist

Síle Nic Chormaic is an Irish physicist specializing in quantum optics, including studies with optical tweezers, optical nanofibers, and whispering-gallery waves, and their applications in particle manipulation and sensors. She works in Japan as a professor in the Okinawa Institute of Science and Technology, where she directs the Light-Matter Interactions for Quantum Technologies Unit.

== Education and career ==
Nic Chormaic credits her initial interest in atomic physics to an undergraduate summer research program at University College London. She received a master's degree in 1992 from Maynooth University. After joint studies with Maynooth and Sorbonne Paris North University supervised by Jacques Robert, she received her Ph.D. through Sorbonne Paris North University in 1994.

Next, she became a Lise Meitner Fellow and postdoctoral researcher at the University of Innsbruck in Austria, working there on laser cooling with Anton Zeilinger. She continued her postdoctoral research at the University of Melbourne in Australia, and as a visiting researcher at the Max Planck Institute for Quantum Optics in Germany.

From 2000 to 2012 she worked in Ireland, as a lecturer at Munster Technological University from 2000 to 2009, as a researcher at the Tyndall National Institute from 2004 to 2012, and as a lecturer at University College Cork from 2006 to 2012.

After a year as an adjunct associate professor at the Okinawa Institute of Science and Technology (OIST) in 2011, she became a regular-rank associate professor in 2012, and a full professor in 2016. While continuing at OIST she also held honorary and visiting positions at the University of KwaZulu-Natal in South Africa, Macquarie University in Australia, Paris-Sud University in France, the Institut Néel in France, Paris-Saclay University in France, and the Chemnitz University of Technology in Germany.

== Recognition ==
Nic Chormaic became a Fellow of the Institute of Physics in 2019. She was named as an Optica Fellow in 2020, "for contributions to fundamental understanding and applications of optical nanofibers, nanofiber-mediated interactions with cold atoms, whispering gallery resonator cavities, and microparticle trapping". She was elected as a Fellow of SPIE in 2026.
