= Irina Sorokina =

Russian laser physicist

Irina T. Sorokina (born 1963) is a Russian laser physicist. She works in Norway as a professor of physics at the Norwegian University of Science and Technology, and is the founder and CEO of spin-off company ATLA Lasers AS.

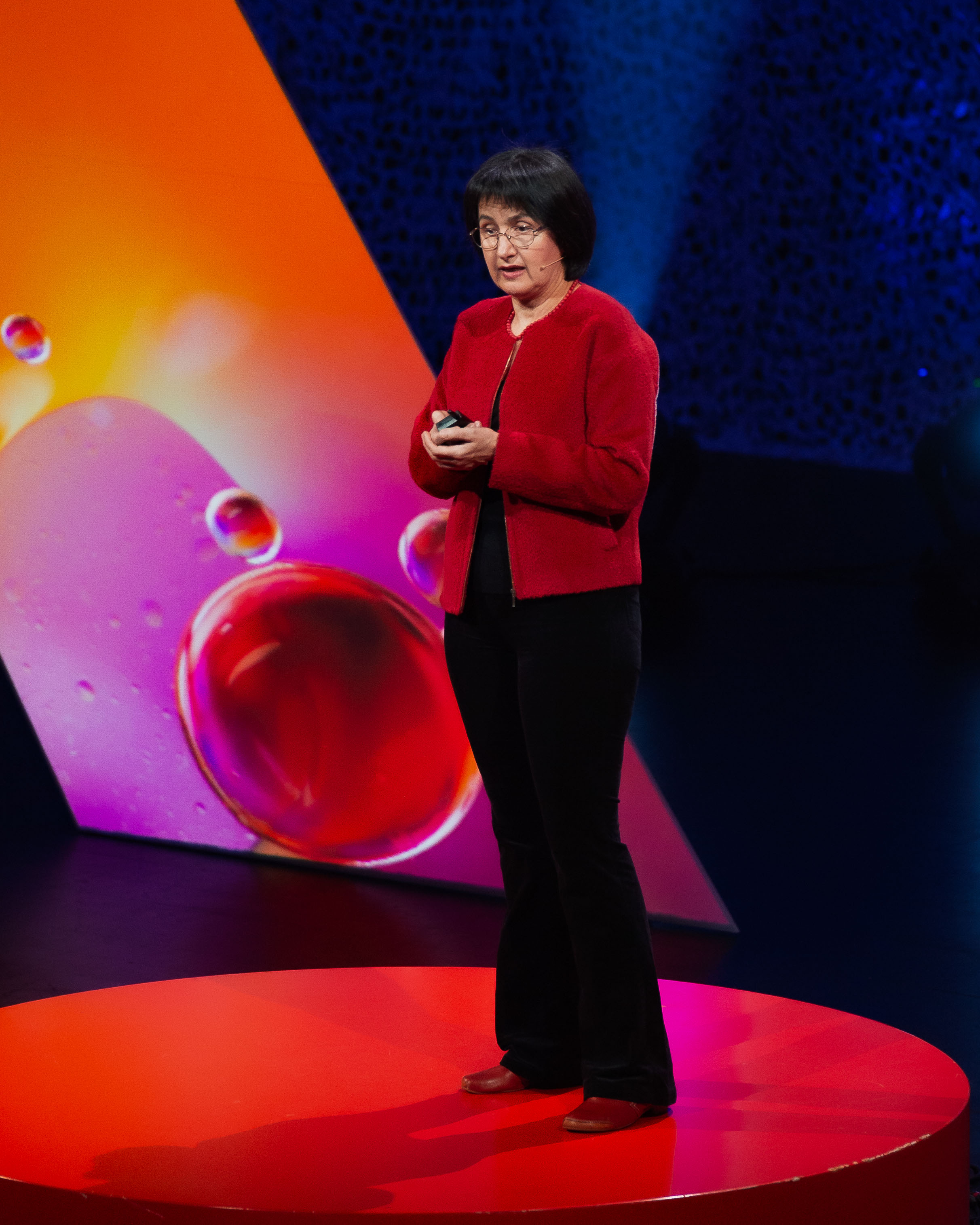
Irina T. Sorokina at TEDxArendal, Norway, 2021 Photo: Birgit Fostervold

== Education and career ==
Sorokina was born in Moscow in 1963. Her father was a physicist who worked on the detection of the cosmic microwave background in the early 1950s and by the 1960s had moved to nonlinear optics and lasers; inspired by him, Sorokina says that she "fell in love with physics, and optics in particular" by the age of 5 or 6.

After earning a master's degree in physics and mathematics at Moscow State University, Sorokina completed a Ph.D. through the Russian Academy of Sciences in 1992. In 2003 she earned a habilitation at TU Wien in Austria.

She was affiliated with TU Wien as a researcher and lecturer from 1991 until 2007, when she moved to the Norwegian University of Science and Technology.

== Recognition ==
Sorokina was elected to the 2007 class of OSA Fellows "for pioneering contributions to tunable and ultrashort-pulse lasers and their applications in spectroscopy, particularly based on novel materials in the near- and mid-infrared spectral ranges". She is also a member of the Royal Norwegian Society of Sciences and Letters, elected in 2009, and is a 2004 winner of the Snell Premium of the Institution of Electrical Engineers.
