= Kostadinka Bizheva =

Bulgarian-Canadian biomedical imaging researcher

Kostadinka "Dida" Bizheva (1970 – 8 September 2025) was a Bulgarian and Canadian researcher in biomedical imaging using optical coherence tomography. She was known for her work in optoretinography, a method for non-invasive imaging of the retina.

== Education and career ==
Bizheva's interest in optics stemmed from a childhood fascination with the work of her grandfather as a movie projectionist. After a 1993 bachelor's degree in physics and electronics engineering at Plovdiv University "Paisii Hilendarski", she came to the United States for graduate study at Tufts University near Boston. She received a master's degree in 1997, and completed her Ph.D. in 2001, working at Tufts in the lab of David A. Boas.

Next, she became a postdoctoral researcher at the Medical University of Vienna in Austria, working there with Wolfgang Drexler as the first postdoc in his lab. In 2004, she became a faculty member in the Department of Physics and Astronomy at the University of Waterloo in Canada, and head of the Biomedical Optics Research Group, with cross appointments to the School of Optometry and Vision Science and to the Electrical and Computer Engineering Department.

== Recognition ==
Bizheva was named as an Optica Fellow in 2025, "for her outstanding contributions to optical imaging in ophthalmology".
