= Christi Madsen =

American optical engineer

Christi Kay Madsen is an American optical engineer. She is a professor in the Department of Electrical & Computer Engineering at Texas A&M University. Her research interests include optical filters, photonics, optical communication using wavelength-division multiplexing, and solar energy. She is particularly known for her development of coupled multiple ring resonator filters and multistage optical all-pass filters.

== Education and career ==
Madsen majored in electrical engineering at the University of Texas at Austin, graduating in 1986. She continued her studies in electrical engineering at Stanford University, where she received a master's degree in 1987, and at Rutgers University, where she completed her Ph.D. in 1996.

She was a distinguished member of the technical staff at Bell Labs and later Lucent Technologies before taking her present position at Texas A&M University in 2004. She is also the founder of a spinoff company from Texas A&M, Sunstrike Optics LLC.

== Textbook ==
Madsen is a coauthor of the textbook Optical Filter Design and Analysis: A Signal Processing Approach (with Jian H. Zhao, Wiley, 1999).

== Recognition ==
Madsen is a 2004 Optica Fellow, honored "for contributions to optical waveguide circuit design and implementation, especially tunable dispersion compensators for high capacity optical networking systems". She was named as a Fellow of SPIE in 2023, "for her technical achievements in the multidisciplinary fields of optics, photonics and imaging, and for her service to SPIE and the optics and photonics community".
