= Cuicui Lu =

Chinese physicist

Cuicui Lu (Chinese: 路 翠翠, born 1986) is a Chinese physicist specializing in nanophotonics and topological photonics. She is a professor in the Department of Optical Physics at the Beijing Institute of Technology.

== Education and career ==
Lu was born in 1986 in Jinan, in Shandong Province. She was an undergraduate at the Shandong Normal University, where she received her bachelor's degree in physics and electronics in 2010. She completed a Ph.D. at Peking University in 2015.

From 2015 to 2018 she was an assistant professor in the Qian Xuesen Laboratory of Space Technology of the China Academy of Space Technology. She moved to the Beijing Institute of Technology in 2018, was tenured as an associate professor in 2021, and has been a full professor since 2022.

== Recognition ==
Lu received the Young Changjiang Scholar award in 2022. She was named as an Optica Fellow, in the 2027 class of fellows, "for pioneering contributions to topological nanophotonic rainbows and their applications in nanophotonic devices and optical chips".
