= Janet Jackel =

American optical networking researcher (1947–2026)

Janet Lehr Jackel (May 30, 1947 – October 17, 2026) was an American optical engineer, who was the chief scientist at Telcordia.

== Life and career ==
Jackel was born in Queens, New York City, on May 30, 1947. She graduated magna cum laude and Phi Beta Kappa from Brandeis University in 1969, with a bachelor's degree in physics. Jackel continued her studies at Cornell University, and completed her Ph.D. in 1976 with the dissertation Nonlinear Optical Spectroscopy in the Excitonic Region of Cadmium Sulfate.

She became a member of the technical staff at Bell Labs from 1976 to 1983, focusing there on the development of optical components based on lithium niobate. After the breakup of the Bell System in 1984, she continued her work at Telcordia. In 2000, she became director of optical networking systems research, and from 2008 to 2011 she was chief scientist at Telcordia. After leaving Telcordia in 2011 she became a consultant for North-C Technologies, and has served as president of Friends of Holmdel Open Space and an environmental commissioner in Holmdel, New Jersey.

Jackel died in Holmdel Township, New Jersey on October 17, 2026, at the age of 79.

== Recognition ==
Jackel was named as an Optica Fellow in 1991, "for the development of novel processing and fabrication techniques for integrated optical circuits, including the invention of the proton exchange process for fabricating waveguides in lithium niobate". She was elected as an IEEE Fellow in 2008, "for contributions to optical communications".
