= Ling-An Wu =

Chinese optical physicist

Ling-An Wu is a Chinese optical physicist known for her experimental research on squeezed states of light, quantum key distribution, quantum imaging, and ghost imaging. She is a professor emerita in the Institute of Physics, Chinese Academy of Sciences.

== Early life and education ==
Wu grew up in England, where her father taught English at the University of Oxford. Her mother instilled her with a love of science, hoping she would become a physician; instead, she went into physics, thinking it would be easier. After education in a girls' school in England, she returned to China at age 18. She obtained a bachelor's degree in 1968 from Peking University, but the Cultural Revolution interrupted her studies, and she was assigned to a state farm for three years. Following this, she became an English-language interpreter for the Institute of Physics of the Chinese Academy of Sciences.

In the early 1980s, in the period of reform and opening up, her husband traveled to the United States as a visiting scholar, and she went with him, leaving her two sons in China with her mother and a nanny. She became a graduate student in physics at the University of Texas at Austin, and completed her Ph.D. there in 1987, at age 43.

== Recognition ==
Wu was the 2013 recipient of the Chinese Physics Society Xie Xide Physics Award for Women Physicists, and the inaugural 2018 recipient of the Optica Diversity and Inclusion Advocacy Recognition Award.

She is a Fellow of the Institute of Physics. She was named as an Optica Fellow, in the 2027 class of fellows, "for outstanding contributions to quantum optics, including establishing the foundation for the field in China and supporting women scientists worldwide".

In 2024, a special issue of Chinese Optics Letters was published in honor of the 80th birthdays of Wu and Kaige Wang.
