= William T. Silfvast =

American physicist

- Education: University of Utah
- Awards: Fellow of the Optical Society of America; Guggenheim Fellowship; Fellow of the American Physical Society; Fellow of the IEEE; Distinguished Technical Staff at AT&T Bell Labs
- Scientific career
- Workplaces: Oxford University; AT&T Bell Labs; Stanford University; University of Central Florida
- Thesis: High Gain Laser Action in the Neutral Spectrum of Lead (1965)
- Doctoral advisor: Grant R. Fowles

William Thomas Silfvast is an American physicist well known for his contributions to gas discharge lasers, soft x-ray lasers, and as the author of the influential textbook Laser Fundamentals. and also several thriller novels (see billsilfvast.com). Silfvast received his PhD in physics from the University of Utah and a postdoctoral fellowship at the University of Oxford. He then spent much of his career at Bell Laboratories in Holmdel, New Jersey, with a Guggenheim Fellowship at Stanford in 1982–83. Later he became a professor and chairman of the Physics Department at the University of Central Florida's Center for Research in Electro-Optics and Lasers (CREOL). Silfvast remains a Professor Emeritus at UCF, and is now retired and living in Oregon. He is a Fellow of the Optical Society of America, the American Physical Society, and the IEEE. In 2010 Silfvast was selected as one of 27 'Laser Luminaries' (laser pioneers) during the celebration of the 50th Anniversary of the discovery of the laser.
