= Silvano Donati =

Italian physicist in the field of photonics

Silvano Donati is a professor emeritus at the University of Pavia, where he has been a Full Professor for 30 years and created the university's Electro-Optical Engineering Group. He was born in Milano, Italy, 19 August 1942, and is a scientist in the field of photonics.

== Career ==
Donati began his career at Research Center of the Electrical Generating Board (CISE) in 1966. Until 1975, he carried out research on nuclear electronics and detectors as well as nascent photonic instrumentation, including telemeters, interferometers, and speckle pattern vibration sensors. From 1967 to 1971, he taught a course in "Electronics" at ISTIM (Milano), in the mechanical engineering Master's degree program.

In 1971 he was appointed a lecturer at the University of Pavia in the electronic engineering curriculum. There, he set up the course Laboratorio Circuiti, the first of its kind in Italy, teaching circuit design aided by hands-on experiments of assembling and testing.

In 1975 he became "Professore Stabilizzato", or tenured, and moved full-time to the University of Pavia where he started teaching his newly activated courses of "Electronic Materials and Technologies" and "Electro-Optical Systems", the first course in photonics within Italian universities. In 1981 he was appointed Full Professor at the University of Pavia, a position he held until 2010.

He gradually developed the lecture notes of the courses he delivered into two published textbooks, entitled "Photodetectors" and "ElectroOptical Instrumentation". From 2010 to 2014 he continued to give courses as a lecturer, and in 2015 he was awarded an emeritus professorship. He also taught courses in several universities in Taiwan as a visiting professor.

He has been designated a Distinguished Lecturer for the IEEE Photonics Society, and a Travelling Lecturer for Optica and SPIE, totaling 120 location lectures in the period between 2010 and 2020.

== Award and honors ==
- 1999 he received the Guglielmo Marconi Prize, awarded by AEI 1999.
- 2002 he received the elevation to "Fellow Member" from IEEE
- 2003 he received the elevation to Optica Fellow
- 2009 he received the "Distinguished Lecturer Award" from the IEEE Photonics Society
- 2009 he received the elevation to "Life Fellow Member" from IEEE
- 2011 he received the "Distinguished Service" Award of the IEEE Photonics Society
- 2015 he received the "IEEE PhoS "Aaron Kressel Award" for research in semiconductor lasers
- SPIE (permanent position)
