= Malini Olivo =

Scientist and university professor

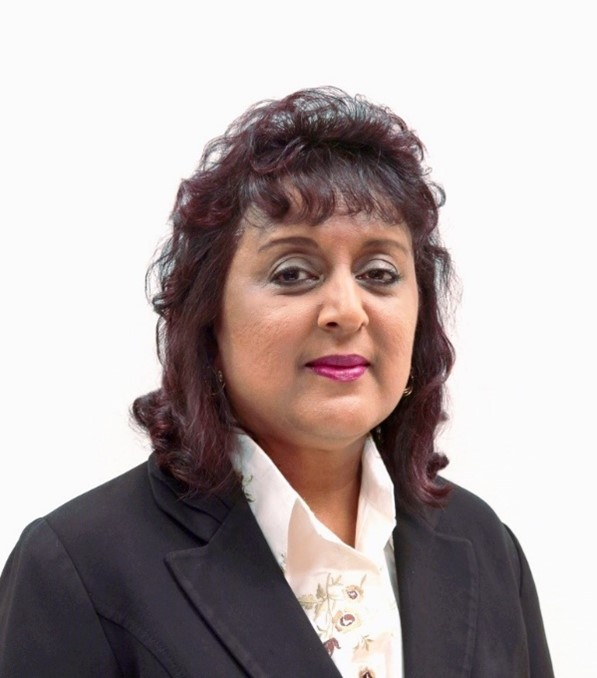
- Education: University of Malaya; National University of Ireland, Galway
- Scientific career
- Fields: Biophotonics, Medtech, Nano-biophotonics
- Workplaces: National University of Ireland, Galway; Royal College of Surgeons; National Cancer Centre Singapore

Malini Olivo is the Distinguished A*STAR Fellow and Distinguished Principal Scientist of A*STAR Skin Research Labs (A*SRL) where she leads the Translational Biophotonics Laboratory. Concurrently, she is also an adjunct professor at the Department of Obstetrics & Gynaecology, National University Health System, NUS, Singapore; LKC School of Medicine, NTU, Singapore; and Royal College of Surgeons Ireland, Dublin, Ireland. In 2015, she was elected by the Optical Society of America for "pioneering contribution in clinical photodiagnostics in the area of clinical spectroscopy and imaging in early cancer detection and photo-therapeutics of cancer".

== Education ==
She obtained a Bachelor of Science with Education degree in Physics and Mathematics in 1985 and a Doctorate degree in Biomedical Physics from the University of Malaya and University College London (UCL) in 1991, working on photodynamic therapy of cancer. Following her doctorate, she honed her expertise in medical biophotonics by doing her post-doctoral training from 1991 to 1995, collaborating with top-notch institutions such as UCL in the UK, McMaster University and the University of Toronto.

== Career ==
She is currently a distinguished principal scientist in A*SRL, a research institute of the Agency for Science, Technology and Research (A*STAR). She was previously appointed as senior scientist and principal investigator at National Cancer Centre Singapore between 1995 and 2009. In 2007, she was also appointed as head of bio-optical imaging at the Singapore Bioimaging Consortium (SBIC) and also adjunct professor at Department of Pharmacy, National University of Singapore. In 2009, she was appointed as Stokes Professor of Biophotonics at the National University of Ireland, Galway, and adjunct professor of biophotonics in Royal College of Surgeons in Ireland.

== Awards and recognition ==
She is recognised for her research in photomedicine by the International Biophotonics Community for her groundbreaking research in photomedicine and is regarded as a pioneer in clinical applications of optical diagnostics and therapeutics in both Singapore and Ireland. For more than 30 years, she has led advancements in biophotonics, analytical point-of-care technologies, and wearable devices, focusing on clinical applications across oncology, dermatology, cardiology, respiratory health, and women’s health. She has also spearheaded five first-in-human clinical trials that have used biophotonics innovations to improve healthcare outcomes in areas such as skin cancer, breast cancer, and inflammatory skin conditions like eczema and psoriasis.

She was awarded the SingHealth Research Excellence Award for her outstanding contributions to clinical biophotonics in cancer diagnostics and therapeutics. Her contributions have earned her numerous accolades across Singapore, Ireland, and the U.S., including her election as a Fellow of the American Institute for Medical and Biological Engineering (AIMBE) and the Optical Society of America (OPTICA) in 2015. She has secured over $50 million in competitive research funding and has authored more than 500 scientific papers, with an H-index of 63. Additionally, she holds over 75 patents for medical technologies, including photoacoustic hybrid imaging, confocal Raman and surface-enhanced Raman spectroscopy, and diffuse optics for clinical imaging and biosensing. She also co-founded two MedTech companies and has published three books and 20 book chapters.

Her international prominence has earned her seats on numerous scientific advisory boards in the field of Photonics in Medicine. She has been honored with the Women in GovTech award for her role in advancing public sector technologies and recognized by organizations such as SPIE, OPTICA, and AIMBE for her contributions as a leading woman in photonics. According to Stanford, she ranks among the top 2% of the world’s most cited scientists.

Prof. Malini holds various international advisory positions and is known for her pioneering research in biophotonics. Her work has earned her titles such as Fellow of the Optical Society of America, Fellow of AIMBE, Fellow of the Institute of Physics, and Fellow of the Singapore National Academy of Science (SNAS) for her contributions in biophotonics science and technology and translation from bench to clinic to market. Additionally, she has contributed to the Nobel subcommittee. Most recently, she received the 2024 Singapore President's Technology Award, where her team was recognized for their integration of biophotonics, machine learning, and clinical data in developing Respiree. This healthcare solution has shown the potential to revolutionize cardio-respiratory disease management in real-world settings, with lasting impact projected over the next 25 to 30 years.

In 2025, she was listed on the Asian Scientist 100 published by Asian Scientist.

== Research Interest ==
- Medical technology
- Translational medicine
- Nano-biophotonics
- Clinical Photodiagnostics in the area of clinical spectroscopy and imaging and phototherapeutics of cancer
- Biophotonics in Medicine and Biology
- Nanomedicine
