= Sophie LaRochelle =

Canadian engineer and university professor

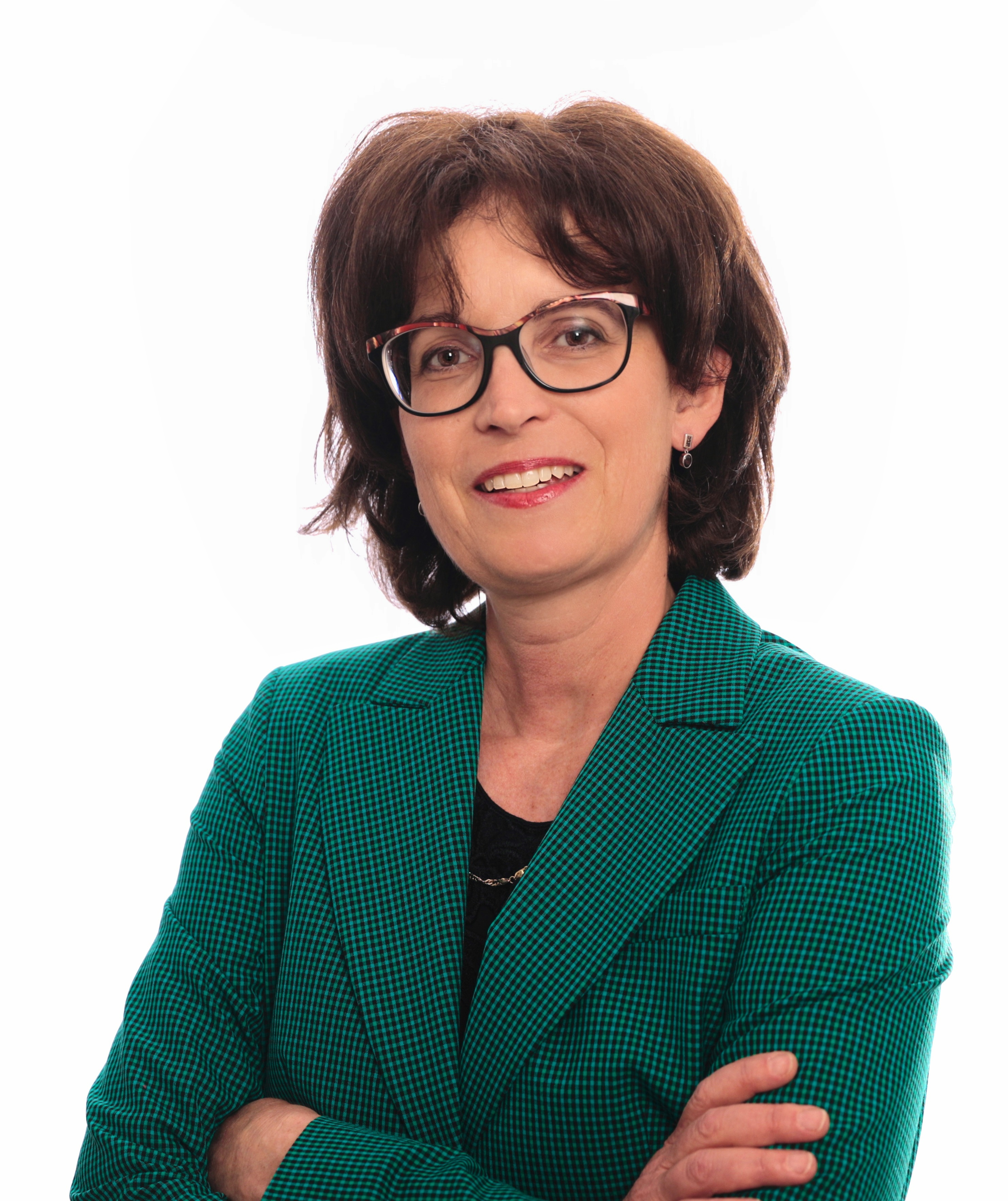
- Education: University of Arizona; Université Laval
- Known for: Inventing fiber optic components for telecommunications
- Awards: Fellow of the Optical Society, IEEE Senior Member, Tier 1 Canada Research Chair
- Scientific career
- Fields: Fiber optic devices, optical communication, integrated optics, optical signal processing

Sophie LaRochelle is a Canada Research Chair and professor of engineering at Université Laval. She specializes in developing fiber optic components for signal-processing and data transmission in telecommunication networks.

== Education ==
LaRochelle earned a Ph.D. in Optics from the University of Arizona College of Optical Sciences in 1992. Her thesis, "Origin and applications of photosensitivity in germanium‐doped silica optical fibers", was supervised by George I. Stegeman. She obtained her M.Sc. in Physics and B.Sc. in Engineering Physics from Université Laval.

== Research and career ==
LaRochelle was appointed to the faculty of the Department of Electrical and Computer Engineering at Université Laval in 1996. Prior to her appointment at Université Laval, she was a Defense Scientist at DRDC Valcartier. She was appointed by Canada's Minister of Science to the Governing Council for the Natural Sciences and Engineering Research Council of Canada in 2015. Currently, LaRochelle is the Director of the Center for Optics, Photonics and Lasers (COPL), a multi-institutional research network in the Province of Quebec.

LaRochelle's research activities focus on optical fiber components, fiber laser systems, integrated photonics, and optical networking. She has made significant contributions to the development of passive and active fiber devices and their application to optical signal processing. She is known for inventing fiber optic components including super-structured fiber Bragg gratings for chromatic dispersion equalizers, multi-wavelength fiber lasers and optical code division multiplexing. Her work has been published in more than 150 scientific articles and she has directed the research work of over 70 graduate students and post-doctoral fellows.

== Awards and honors ==
LaRochelle was Holder of the Canada Research Chair (Tier 2) in Optical Fiber Communications and Components from 2000–2010. Since 2012, she has been Holder of the Canada Research Chair (Tier 1) in Advanced Photonics Technologies for Communications. She was inducted as a Fellow of the Optical Society in 2015, and as an IEEE Fellow in 2021, "for contributions to fiber devices and data transmission technologies". LaRochelle was elected to the Board of Directors of The Optical Society in 2019 and will serve through 2021.
