= Elsa M. Garmire =

American physicist

Elsa Meints Garmire
- Born: 1939 (age 86–87); Buffalo, New York
- Citizenship: American
- Education: Radcliffe College; MIT
- Scientific career
- Fields: Physics
- Academic advisors: Charles Townes

Elsa M. Garmire (b 1939 ) is an American physicist. She was the Sydney E. Junkins Professor of Engineering at Dartmouth College, where she had served as dean of Thayer School of Engineering. Elected to the American Academy of Arts and Sciences, the National Academy of Engineering, and the National Academy of Inventors, she helped pioneer laser technology and is an expert in nonlinear optics. She has patented devices to enhance optical communications including lasers, waveguides, and detectors.

Garmire was an Optical Society (OSA) board member from 1983 to 1985 and was elected vice president in 1991. She served as the 1993 OSA president and has been active on many awards committees. Garmire is currently a member of the OSA Presidential Advisory Committee. In 2019 Garmire was named the first woman to become an OSA Honorary Member "For contributions to nonlinear optics and optoelectronics, leadership in linking science and public policy, and for service to OSA".

== Early life and education ==
Elsa Meints Garmire was born in Buffalo, New York, on November 9, 1939. Her father worked as a chemical engineer, working on the design of chemistry labs for the Argonne National Laboratory. Her mother studied music and gave violin lessons but was mostly a stay-at-home wife. Garmire had two sisters, one elder and one younger. Early in her life, Garmire's family moved a lot as, despite having a PhD in chemistry, her father spent years finding a well-paying job during the Great Depression. Garmire decided to become a scientist when, in the sixth grade, she was handed a brochure about research scientist careers.

As a high school student in the 1950s, she topped her class, earning all A's. Garmire decided to join Radcliffe College, a former partner school to the male-only Harvard College, owing to its reputation as a challenging college. Garmire received her B.A. in physics in 1961 at Radcliffe College, one of three women studying physics there at the time.

After Radcliffe, she received her PhD in physics at MIT in 1965, where she was assigned to assist Professor Charles Townes, the 1964 Nobel laureate and inventor of the laser. She was the first student he took on at MIT. "The laser had been first demonstrated one year before [she] started grad school," Garmire said. "[She] had never heard of it ... And [Townes] assigned me to get started on the second laser that was commercially sold". During her PhD, Garmire demonstrated important nonlinear effects produced by powerful laser beams acting on atoms and molecules.

== Career and Research ==
Garmire spent her early career at California Institute of Technology as a senior research fellow. Following a couple of years in industry, Garmire joined the University of Southern California where she became William Hogue Professor of Electrical Engineering, professor of physics, and director of the Center for Laser Studies. In 1995, after 20 years at USC, Garmire moved to Dartmouth College where she served as dean of the Thayer School of Engineering. She was the first female dean, the Thayer School of Engineering. However, Garmire served as dean for only two years before returning to a faculty member position, as she preferred to stay in research.

Author of over 250 journal papers and holder of nine patents, she has been on the editorial board of five technical journals. She is a member of the National Academy of Engineering and the American Academy of Arts and Sciences, a fellow of the Institute of Electrical and Electronics Engineers, a fellow of the American Physical Society, and a fellow of the Optical Society of America; she has served on the boards of three other professional societies. In 1994, she received the Society of Women Engineers Achievement Award. She has been a Fulbright senior lecturer and a visiting faculty member in Japan, Australia, Germany, and China. She has been chair of the NSF Advisory Committee on Engineering Technology and served on the NSF Advisory Committee on Engineering and the Air Force Science Advisory Board.

Garmire was elected to the National Academy of Engineering in 1989 for contributions to nonlinear optics and optoelectronics and for leadership in education.

== Work with laser art ==
In the summer of 1968, Garmire joined the organization Experiments in Art and Technology. She used laser light in artistic presentations, such as a July 1969 "laser wall" made of argon laser beams through which spectators could walk. For the Pepsi Pavilion at Expo '70 in Osaka, Garmire helped E.A.T. build "the world's largest hemispherical mirror".

In her Caltech lab, Garmire experimented with light patterns caused by shining laser beams through transparent random or structured materials, such as dried clear glue on glass or patterned Plexiglas. These diffused the coherent light into abstract shapes with pure colors, internal diffraction pattern texture, and a shimmering speckle. By rotating the diffusing material, the shapes would slowly evolve into new forms.

In November 1970 filmmakers Ivan Dryer and Dale Pelton visited Garmire's lab, filmed the moving patterns and set them to music. The resulting short movie, LaserImage, dissatisfied both Dryer and Garmire as it lacked the vibrant colors and speckle of live laser light. In December 1970, they proposed to the Griffith Observatory in Los Angeles to present a live laser show in the planetarium, to be called Laserium. The Griffith director at that time turned down the proposal.

She later mused, "I did not patent my idea. I'm a great believer that people should do it. In fact in 1971, I suggested that there could be a home laser light show, and I demonstrated it on television".

In January 1973 Dryer formed a company called Laser Images Inc., with Garmire as president. The company used lasers for a few concerts and special events.

In June 1973, Dryer did a demonstration at Caltech attended by the new director of the Griffith. He agreed to a one-month trial at the Griffith. The first Laserium show was held November 19, 1973. By the end of the trial, 500 people a night had to be turned away from the shows.

At some point, Garmire left the company, later saying "I loved it. I loved the classical music. And when they switched to the rock music, that's when I decided to absent myself."

While Garmire was not the first "laser artist", it was her work with Dryer that led to the popularization of laser light shows as an ongoing, regularly scheduled presentation. Laser Images' Laserium shows were eventually presented in 46 cities and were seen by over 20 million people as of 2002.

== Personal life and retirement ==
Elsa Garmire retired from her job as the Sydney E. Junkins 1887 Professor of Engineering at Dartmouth in 2016. "She [Garmire] was a very important, early and pioneering contributor to the development of the laser," said Joseph J. Helble, dean of the Thayer School of Engineering and Professor of Engineering at Dartmouth, "She really contributed to the fundamental understanding of how lasers operate, how laser phenomena operate, what lasers do to break down other material, and eventually contributed her understanding and her development to fundamental physics, which led to the development of things like semiconductor lasers that are ubiquitous".

== Awards ==
- 2019, Honorary Member of The Optical Society
- 2014, National Academy of Inventors (NAI) Charter Fellow
- 2004, National Associate of the National Academies
- 1996, Member, American Academy of Arts and Sciences
- 1994, Fellow, American Physical Society
- 1994, Achievement Award and Fellow, Society of Women Engineers
- 1989, Life Member, National Academy of Engineering
- 1980, Fellow and Life Member, Institute of Electronics and Electrical Engineers
- 1981, Fellow of The Optical Society of America (now The Optical Society)

== See also ==
- Past Presidents of the OSA
- Tietjen, Jill S.; Ozturk, Mehmet C. (2026). "Chapter 6: Elsa Garmire (1939-)". Pioneering Women of Solid-State Physics: Breaking Boundaries. Springer Cham. ISBN 978-3-032-18112-1.

== Sources ==
"Media Art Net: E.A.T." MediaArtNet.org.

Daukantas, Patricia (2010-05-01). "A Short History of Laser Light Shows" (PDF). OPN Optics & Photonics News.

McCray, Patrick (2014-12-26). "Art at the Speed of Light". Leaping Robot Blog.

Garmire, Elsa (2006-02-15). "Presidential Lecture Series" (PDF). Dartmouth College.

Dryer, Ivan. "Laserium's Origins". Laserium.com. Archived from the original on 2017-06-26.

Interview of Elsa Garmire by Joan Bromberg on 1985 February 4, Niels Bohr Library & Archives, American Institute of Physics, College Park, MD USA, www.aip.org/history-programs/niels-bohr-library/oral-histories/4621 Retrieved 2023-06-20.

"Elsa Garmire." Dartmouth Engineering, engineering.dartmouth.edu/community/faculty/elsa-garmire. Accessed 19 Mar. 2024 https://engineering.dartmouth.edu/community/faculty/elsa-garmire
