= Microwave chemistry sensor =

Surface acoustic wave gas sensor or surface acoustic wave (SAW) sensors consist of an input transducer, a chemically adsorbent polymer film, and an output transducer on a piezoelectric substrate, which is typically made of quartz. The input transducer launches an acoustic wave that travels through the chemical film and is detected by the output transducer.

SAW devices have been able to detect and distinguish between organophosphates, chlorinated hydrocarbons, ketones, alcohols, aromatic hydrocarbons, saturated hydrocarbons, and water. Such a device made at Sandia National Laboratories runs at a very high frequency (approximately 525 MHz), and the velocity and attenuation of the signal are sensitive to the viscoelasticity and mass of the thin film.

The device has four channels, each channel consisting of a transmitter and a receiver, separated by a small distance. Three of the four channels contain a polymer deposited on the substrate between the transmitter and receiver. The purpose of the polymers is to adsorb chemicals of interest, with different polymers having different affinities for various chemicals. When a target chemical is adsorbed, the mass of the associated polymer increases, causing a slight change in phase of the acoustic signal relative to the reference (fourth) channel, which contains no polymer.

The SAW device also contains three Application Specific Integrated Circuit chips (ASICs), containing the electronics that functions to analyze the signals and release a DC voltage output signal proportional to the phase shift. It contains transducers and ASICs that are bonded to a piece of quartz glass, which is placed in a leadless chip carrier (LCC). Wire bonds connect the terminals of the leadless chip carrier to the SAW circuits.

== Application ==
The Microwave chemistry sensor can detect several chemical materials including:

- Lead
- Mercury
- Oxygen

== See also ==
- Chemosensor
