= Molecular sensor =

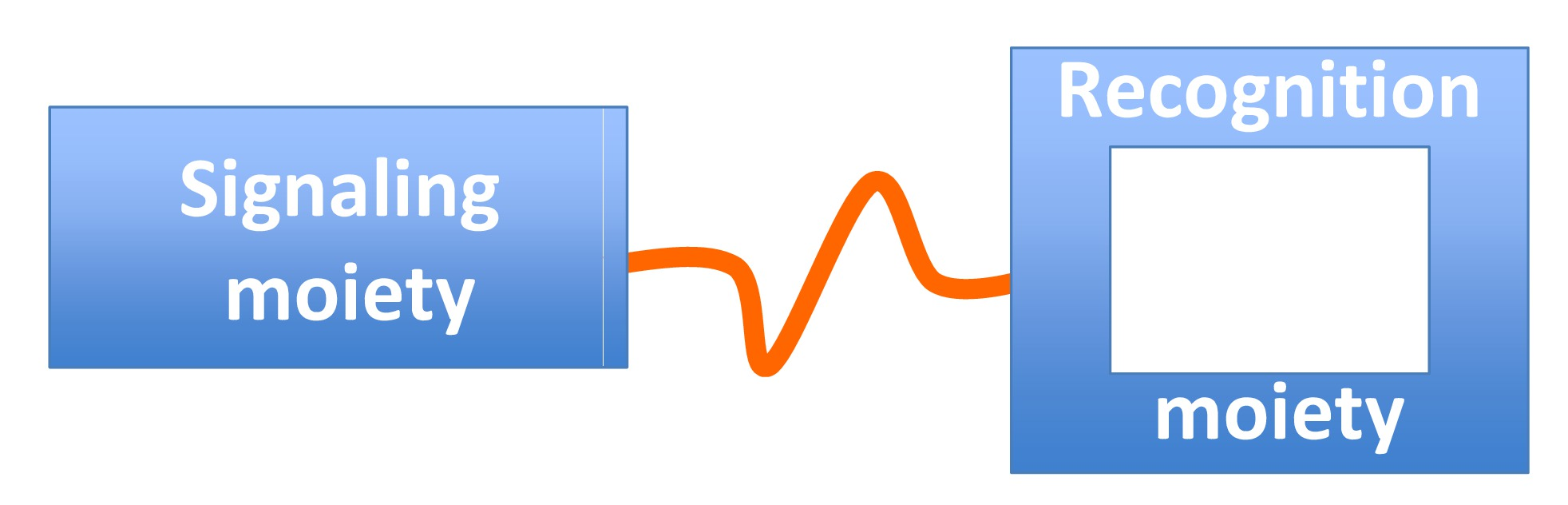
Schematic representation of a chemosensor consisting of a signalling moiety and a recognition moiety that are connected together in some way that facilitates the communication between the two parts.

A molecular sensor or chemosensor is a molecular structure (organic or inorganic complexes) that is used for sensing of an analyte to produce a detectable change or a signal. The action of a chemosensor relies on an interaction occurring at the molecular level, and usually involves the continuous monitoring of the activity of a chemical species in a given matrix such as solution, air, blood, tissue, waste effluents, drinking water, etc. The application of chemosensors is referred to as chemosensing, which is a form of molecular recognition. All chemosensors are designed to contain a signalling moiety and a recognition moiety, that is connected either directly to each other or through some kind of connector or a spacer. The signalling is often optically based electromagnetic radiation, giving rise to changes in either (or both) the ultraviolet and visible absorption or the emission properties of the sensors. Chemosensors may also be electrochemically based. Small molecule sensors are related to chemosensors. These are traditionally, however, considered as being structurally simple molecules and reflect the need to form chelating molecules for complexing ions in analytical chemistry. Chemosensors are synthetic analogues of biosensors, the difference being that biosensors incorporate biological receptors such as antibodies, aptamers or large biopolymers.

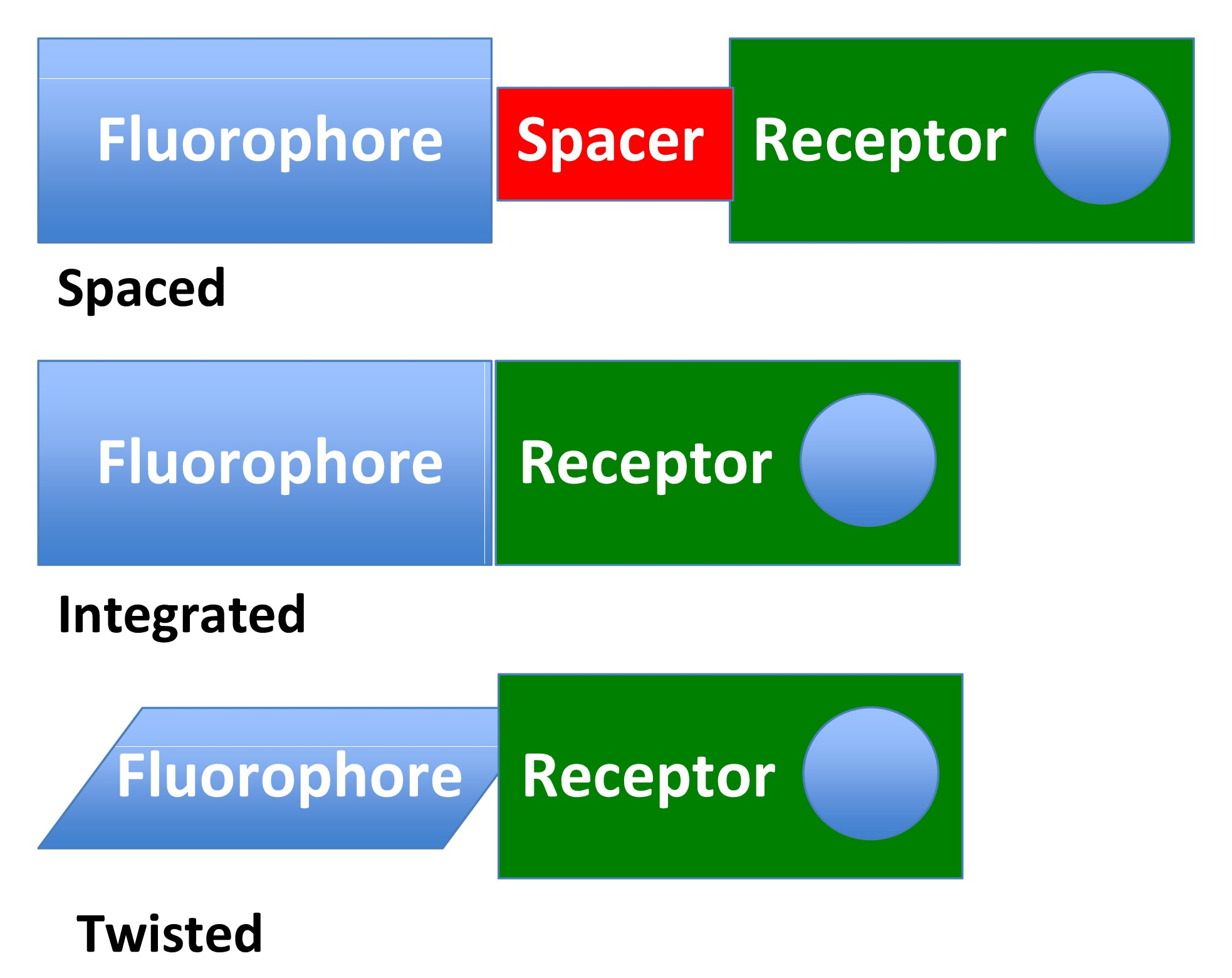
Illustration of the common models used in sensor construction.

Chemosensors describes molecule of synthetic origin that signal the presence of matter or energy. A chemosensor can be considered as type of an analytical device. Chemosensors are used in everyday life and have been applied to various areas such as in chemistry, biochemistry, immunology, physiology, etc. and within medicine in general, such as in critical care analysis of blood samples. Chemosensors can be designed to detect/signal a single analyte or a mixture of such species in solution. This can be achieved through either a single measurement or through the use of continuous monitoring. The signalling moiety acts as a signal transducer, converting the information (recognition event between the chemosensor and the analyte) into an optical response in a clear and reproducible manner.

Most commonly, the change (the signal) is observed by measuring the various physical properties of the chemosensor, such as the photo-physical properties seen in the absorption or emission, where different wavelengths of the electromagnetic spectrum are used. Consequently, most chemosensors are described as being either colorimetric (ground state) or luminescent (excited state, fluorescent or phosphorescent). Colorimetric chemosensors give rise to changes in their absorption properties (recorded using ultraviolet–visible spectroscopy), such as in absorption intensity and wavelength or in chirality (using circularly polarized light, and CD spectroscopy).

Receptor for selectively binding heparine	Receptor for selectively binding tannines	Receptor for selectively binding Saxitoxin
Heparin binding	Tannic acid binding	Saxitoxin binding

In contrast, then in the case of luminescent chemosensors, the detection of an analyte, using fluorescence spectroscopy, gives rise to spectral changes in the fluorescence excitation or in the emission spectra, which are recorded using a fluorimeter. Such changes can also occur in other excited state properties such as in the excited state life-time(s), quantum yield of fluorescence, and polarisation, etc. of the chemosensor. Fluorescence detection can be achieved at a low concentration (below ~ 10-6 M) with most fluorescence spectrometers. This offers the advantage of using the sensors directly within fibre optic systems. Examples of the use of chemosensors are to monitor blood content, drug concentrations, etc., as well as in environmental samples. Ions and molecules occur in abundance in biological and environmental systems where they are involved/effete biological and chemical processes. The development of molecular chemosensors as probes for such analytes is an annual multibillion-dollar business involving both small SMEs as well as large pharmaceutical and chemical companies.

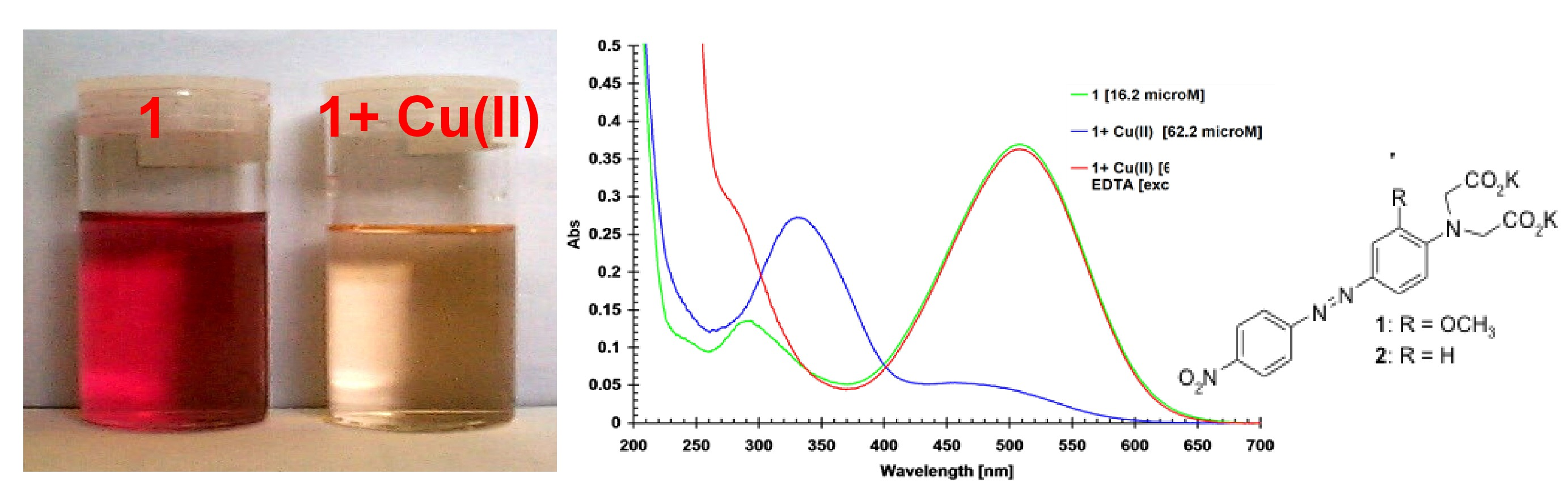
Left: Example of the change observed in the colorimetric azobenzene based chemosensor 1 in pH 7.4 solution upon recognition of copper ion. The recognition/sensing event being communicated as a clear change in colour that is visible to the naked eye. Right: The corresponding changes in the UV-visible absorption spectrum of the chemosensor upon recognition/binding to Cu(II) (shown in blue) and from the free sensor (shown in green). The changes after adding EDTA reverse the changes result in the formation of original spectra (shown in red).

Chemosensors were first used to describe the combination of a molecular recognition with some form of reporter so the presence of a guest can be observed (also referred to as the analyte, cf. above). Chemosensors are designed to contain a signalling moiety and a molecular recognition moiety (also called the binding site or a receptor). Combining both of these components can be achieved in a number of ways, such as integrated, twisted or spaced. Chemosensors are consider as major component of the area of molecular diagnostics, within the discipline of supramolecular chemistry, which relies on molecular recognition. In terms of supramolecular chemistry, chemosensing is an example of host–guest chemistry, where the presence of a guest (the analyte) at the host site (the sensor) gives rise to recognition event (e.g. sensing) that can be monitored in real time. This requires the binding of the analyte to the receptor, using all kinds of binding interactions such as hydrogen bonding, dipole- and electrostatic interactions, solvophobic effect, metal chelation, etc. The recognition/binding moiety is responsible for selectivity and efficient binding of the guest/analyte, which depend on ligand topology, characteristics of the target (ionic radius, size of molecule, chirality, charge, coordination number and hardness, etc.) and the nature of the solvent (pH, ionic strength, polarity). Chemosensors are normally developed to be able to interact with the target species in reversible manner, which is a prerequisite for continuous monitoring.

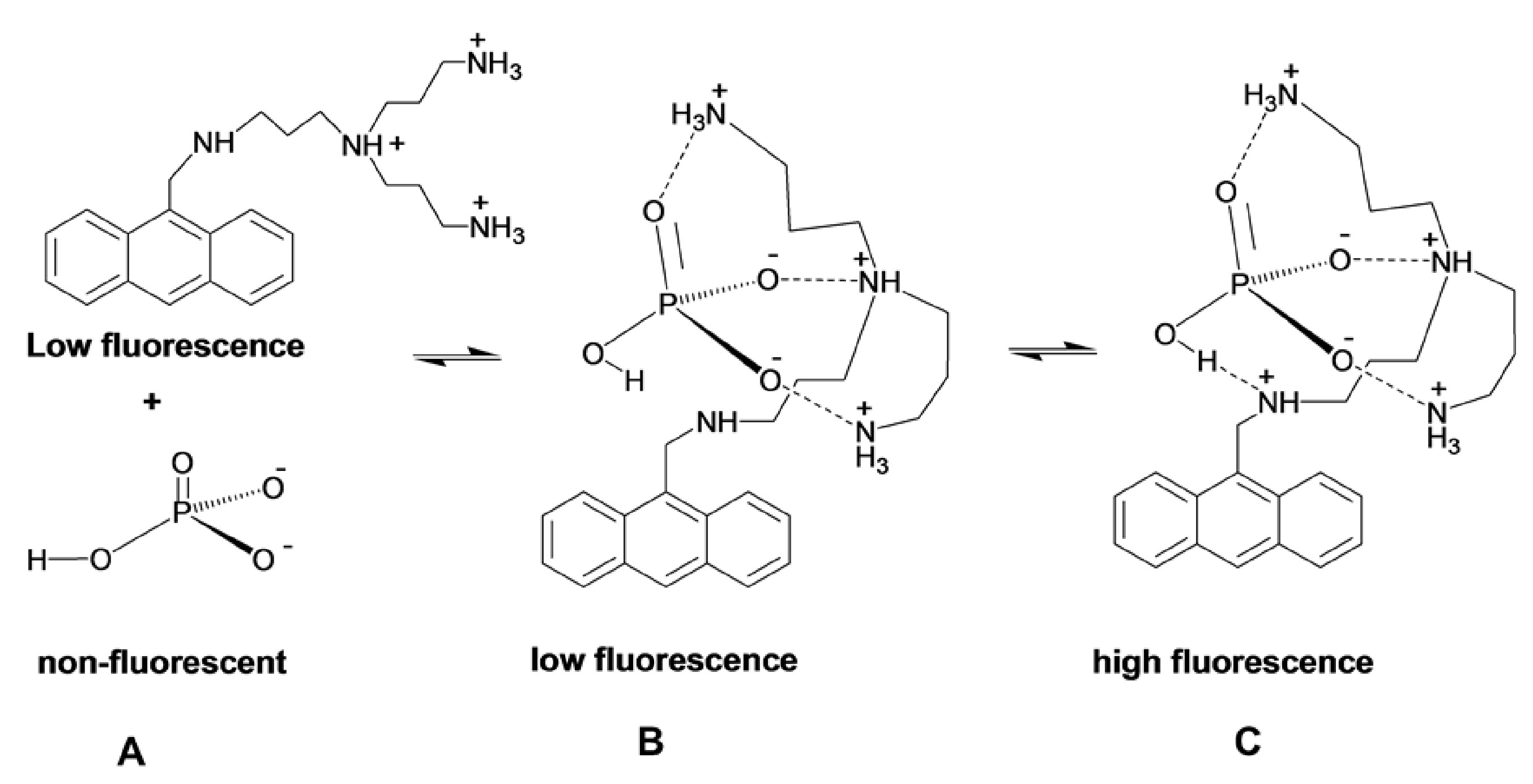
One of the first examples of a fluorescent chemosensor developed for anion monitoring (phosphate) in competitive aqueous media. The chemosensors is not emissive in its 'free' form A, but upon recognition of the phosphate by the polyamine receptor moiety (through mixture of electrostatic and hydrogen bonding interactions) B, the fluorescence emission is gradually enhanced, resulting eventually in the formation of a highly fluorescent (host:guest) structure C.

Optical signalling methods (such as fluorescence) are sensitive and selective, and provide a platform for real-time response, and local observation. As chemosensors are designed to be both targeting (i.e. can recognize and bind a specific species) and sensitive to various concentration ranges, they can be used to observed real-live events on the cellular level. As each molecule can give rise to a signal/readout, that can be selectively measured, chemosensors are often said to be non-invasive and consequently have attracted significant attentions for their applications within biological matter, such as within living cells. Many examples of chemosensors have been developed for observing cellular function and properties, including monitoring ion flux concentrations and transports within cells such as Ca(II), Zn(II), Cu(II) and other physiologically important cations and anions, as well as biomolecules.

The design of ligands for the selective recognition of suitable guests such as metal cations and anions has been an important goal of supramolecular chemistry. The term supramolecular analytical chemistry has recently been coined to describe the application of molecular sensors to analytical chemistry. Small molecule sensors are related to chemosensors. However, these are traditionally considered as being structurally simple molecules and reflect the need to form chelating molecules for complexing ions in analytical chemistry.

== History ==
While chemosensors were first defined in the 1980s, the first example of such a fluorescent chemosensor can be documented to be that of Friedrich Goppelsroder, who in 1867, developed a method for the determination/sensing of aluminium ion, using fluorescent ligand/chelate. This and subsequent work by others, gave birth to what is considered as modern analytical chemistry.

In the 1980s the development of chemosensing was achieved by Anthony W. Czarnik, A. Prasanna de Silva and Roger Tsien, in the book Fluorescent Chemosensors for Ion and Molecule Recognition. They focused on the analysis of various types of luminescent probes for ions and molecules in solutions and within biological cells, for real-time applications. Czarnik introduced the term 'chemosensor' to describe synthetic compounds capable of binding to analytes and providing a reversible signaling response. Tsien went on to studying and developing this area of research further by developing and studding fluorescent proteins for applications in biology, such as green fluorescent proteins (GFP) for which he was awarded the Nobel Prize in Chemistry in 2008. The work of Lynn Sousa in the late 1970s, on the detection of alkali metal ions, possibly resulting in one of the first examples of the use of supramolecular chemistry in fluorescent sensing design, as well as that of J.-M. Lehn, H. Bouas-Laurent and co-workers at Université Bordeaux I, France. The development of PET sensing of transition metal ions was developed by L. Fabbrizzi, among others.

In chemosensing, the use of fluorophore connected to the receptor via a covalent spacer is now commonly referred to as fluorophores-spacer-receptor principle. In such systems, the sensing event is normally described as being due to changes in the photophysical properties of the chemosensor systems due to chelation induced enhanced fluorescence (CHEF), and photoinduced electron transfer (PET), mechanisms. In principle the two mechanisms are based on the same idea; the communication pathway is in the form of a through-space electron transfer from the electron rich receptors to the electron deficient fluorophores (through space). This results in fluorescence quenching (active electron transfer), and the emission from the chemosensor is 'switched off,' for both mechanisms in the absence of the analytes. However, upon forming a host–guest complex between the analyte and receptor, the communication pathway is broken and the fluorescence emission from the fluorophores is enhanced, or 'switched on'. In other words, the fluorescence intensity and quantum yield are enhanced upon analyte recognition.

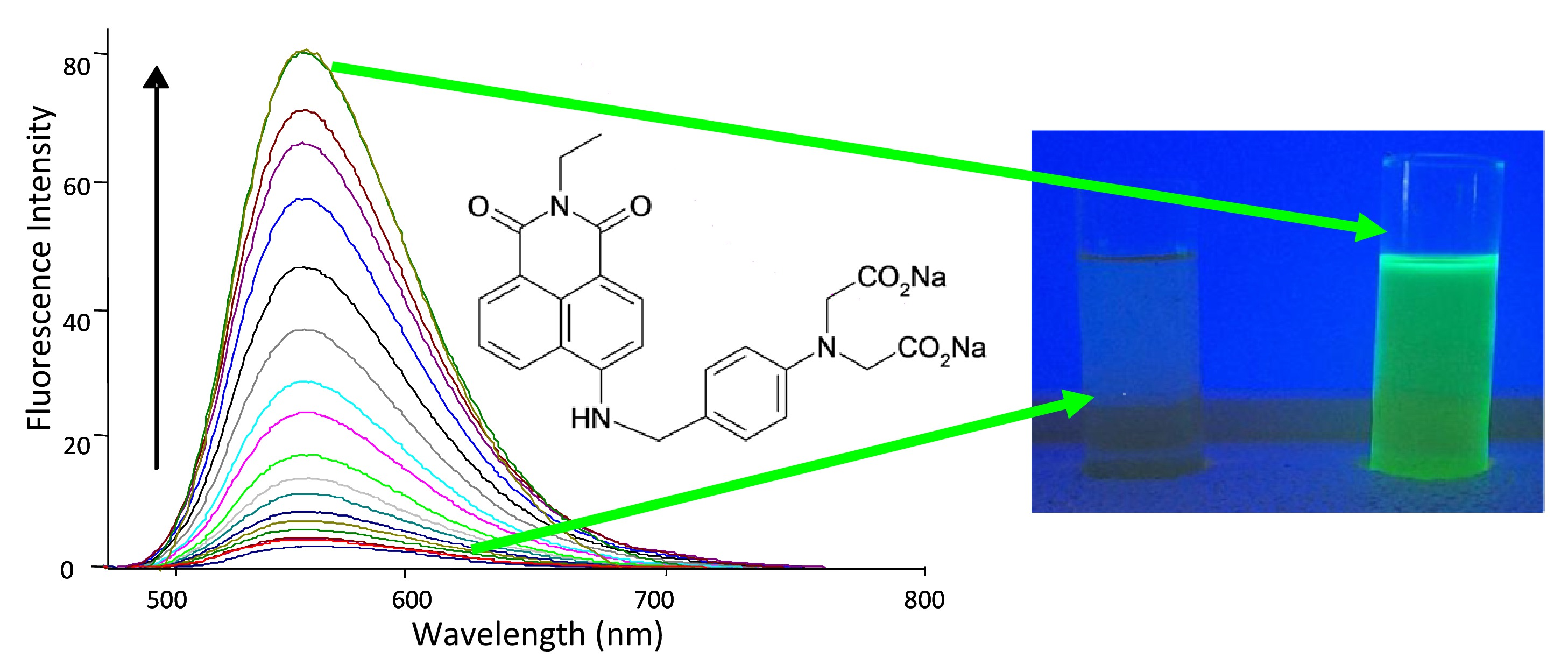
Left: Example of the changes in the fluorescence emission spectra of a chemosensor for zinc, where the emission is enhanced or 'switched on' upon recognition of the zinc ion in buffered solution. Right: the changes under a UV lamp demonstrating the striking difference in the luminescence emission upon addition of Zn(II): left valve in the absence (free chemosensor) right in the presence of Zn(II).

The fluorophores-receptor can also be integrated within the chemosensor. This leads to changes in the emission wavelength, which often results in change in colour. When the sensing event results in the formation of a signal that is visible to the naked eye, such sensors are normally referred to as colorimetric. Many examples of colorimetric chemosensors for ions such as fluoride have been developed. A pH indicator can be consider as a colorimetric chemosensors for protons. Such sensors have been developed for other cations, as well as anions and larger organic and biological molecules, such as proteins and carbohydrates.

== Design principles ==
Chemosensors are nano-sized molecules and for application in vivo need to be non-toxic. A chemosensor must be able to give a measurable signal in direct response to the analyte recognition. Hence, the signal response is directly related to the magnitude of the sensing event (and, in turn concentration of the analyte). While the signalling moiety acts as a signal transducer, converting the recognition event into an optical response. The recognition moiety is responsible for binding to the analyte in a selective and reversible manner. If the binding sites are 'irreversible chemical reactions,' the indicators are described as fluorescent chemodosimeters, or fluorescent probes.

An active communication pathway has to be open between the two moieties for the sensor to operate. In colorimetric chemosensors, this usually relies on the receptor and transducer to be structurally integrated. In luminescent/fluorescent chemosensing these two parts can be 'spaced' out or connected with a covalent spacer. The communication pathway is through electron transfer or energy transfer for such fluorescent chemosensors. The effectiveness of the host–guest recognition between the receptor and the analyte depends on several factors, including the design of the receptor moiety, which is objective is to match as much the nature of the structural nature of the target analyte, as well as the nature of the environment that the sensing event occurs within (e.g. the type of media, i.e. blood, saliva, urine, etc. in biological samples). An extension to this approach is the development of molecular beacons, which are oligonucleotide hybridization probes based on fluorescence signalling where the recognition or the sensing event is communicated through enhancement or reduction in luminescence through the use of Förster resonance energy transfer (FRET) mechanism.

== Fluorescent chemosensing ==
All chemosensors are designed to contain a signalling moiety and a recognition moiety. These are integrated directly or connected with a short covalent spacer depending on the mechanism involved in the signalling event. The chemosensor can be based on self-assembly of the sensor and the analyte. An example of such a design are the (indicator) displacement assays IDA. IDA sensor for anions such as citrate or phosphate ions have been developed whereby these ions can displace a fluorescent indicator in an indicator-host complex. The so-called UT taste chip (University of Texas) is a prototype electronic tongue and combines supramolecular chemistry with charge-coupled devices based on silicon wafers and immobilized receptor molecules.

Most examples of chemosensors for ions, such as those of alkali metal ions (Li+, Na+, K+, etc.) and alkali earth metal ions (Mg2+, Ca2+, etc.) are designed so that the excited state of the fluorophore component of the chemosensor is quenched by an electron transfer when the sensor is not complexed to these ions. No emission is thus observed, and the sensor is sometimes referred to as being 'switched off'. By complexing the sensor with a cation, the conditions for electron transfer are altered so that the quenching process is blocked, and fluorescence emission is 'switched on'. The probability of PET is governed by the overall free energy of the system (the Gibbs free energy ΔG). The driving force for PET is represented by ΔGET, the overall changes in the free energy for the electron transfer can be estimated using the Rehm-Weller equation. Electron transfer is distance dependent and decreases with increasing spacer length. Quenching by electron transfer between uncharged species leads to the formation of a radical ion pair. This is sometimes referred to as being the primary electron transfer. The possible electron transfer, which takes place after the PET, is referred to as the 'secondary electron transfer'. Chelation Enhancement Quenching (CHEQ) is the opposite effect seen for CHEF. In CHEQ, a reduction is observed in fluorescent emission of the chemosensor in comparison to that seen the originally for the 'free' sensor upon host–guest formation. As electron transfer is directional, such systems have also been described by the PET principle, being described as an enhancement in PET from the receptor to the fluorophore with enhanced degree of quenching. Such an effect has been demonstrated for the sensing of anions such as carboxylates and fluorides.

A large number of examples of chemosensors have been developed by scientists in physical, life and environmental sciences. The advantages of fluorescence emission being 'switched on' from 'off' upon the recognition event enabling the chemosensors to be compared to 'beacons in the night'. As the process is reversible, the emission enhancement is concentration dependent, only becoming 'saturated' at high concentrations (fully bound receptor). Hence, a correlation can be made between luminescence (intensity, quantum yield and in some cases lifetime) and the analyte concentration. Through careful design, and evaluation of the nature of the communication pathway, similar sensors based on the use of 'on-off' switching, or 'on-off-on,' or 'off-on-off' switching have been designed. The incorporation of chemosensors onto surfaces, such as quantum dots, nanoparticles, or into polymers is also a fast-growing area of research. Fluorescence sensing has also been combined with electrochemical techniques, conferring the advantages of both methods. Other examples of chemosensors that work on the principle of switching fluorescent emission either on or off include, Förster resonance energy transfer (FRET), internal charge transfer (ICT), twisted internal charge transfer (TICT), metal-based emission (such as in lanthanide luminescence), and excimer and exciplex emission and aggregation-induced emission (AIE). Chemosensors were one of the first examples of molecules that could result in switching between 'on' or 'off' states through the use of external stimuli and as such can be classed as synthetic molecular machine, to which the Nobel Prize in Chemistry was awarded to in 2016 to Jean-Pierre Sauvage, Fraser Stoddart and Bernard L. Feringa.

The application of these same design principles used in chemosensing also paved the way for the development of molecular logic gates mimics (MLGMs), being first proposed using PET based fluorescent chemosensors by de Silva and co-workers in 1993. Molecules have been made to operate in accordance with Boolean algebra that performs a logical operation based on one or more physical or chemical inputs. The field has advanced from the development of simple logic systems based on a single chemical input to molecules capable of carrying out complex and sequential operations.

== Applications of Chemosensors ==
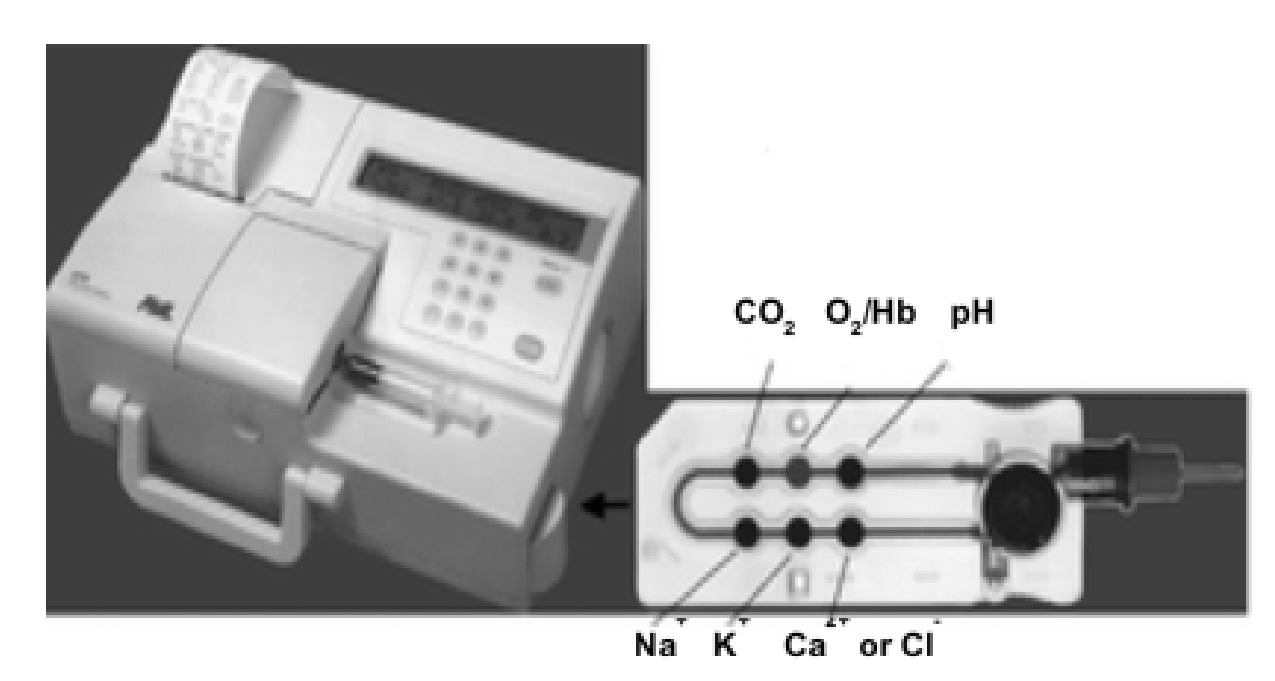
POTI Critical Care Analyzer developed for the sensing of various ions and molecules that are important for critical care analysis of blood samples. This kind of analyzer is used in ambulances and hospitals around the world. This system is based on monitoring the changes in various chemosensors through modulation in their fluorescence properties.

Chemosensors have been incorporated through surface functionalization onto particles and beads such as metal based nanoparticles, quantum dots, carbon-based particles and into soft materials such as polymers to facilitate their various applications.

Other receptors are sensitive not to a specific molecule but to a molecular compound class, these chemosensors are used in array- (or microarray) based sensors. Array-based sensors utilize analyte binding by the differential receptors. One example is the grouped analysis of several tannic acids that accumulate in ageing Scotch whisky in oak barrels. The grouped results demonstrated a correlation with the age but the individual components did not. A similar receptor can be used to analyze tartrates in wine.

The application of chemosensors in cellular imaging is particularly promising as most biological process are now monitored by using imaging technologies such as confocal fluorescence and super resolution microscopy, among others.

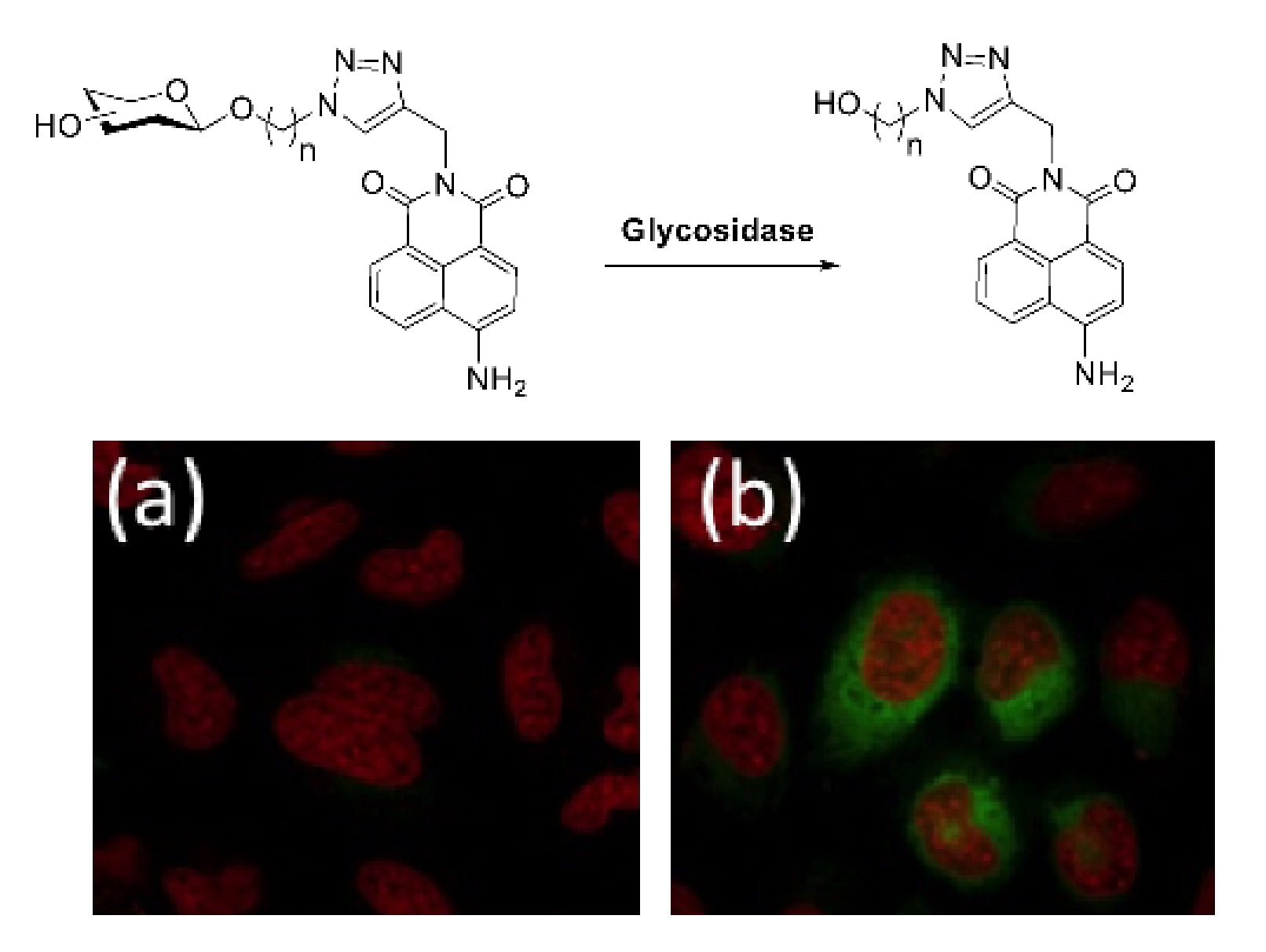
Fluorescence chemosensor/probe for monitoring enzymatic activity using confocal fluorescence microscopy. a) The probe is not luminescent and not delivered into cells. b)The sugar unit is recognized by a glycosidase which cleaves it off and releases the chemosensor into cells.

The compound saxitoxin is a neurotoxin found in shellfish and a chemical weapon. An experimental sensor for this compound is again based on PET. Interaction of saxitoxin with the sensor's crown ether moiety kills its PET process towards the fluorophore and fluorescence is switched from off to on. The unusual boron moiety causes the fluorescence to occur in the visible light part of the electromagnetic spectrum.

Chemosensors also have applications in chemistry, biochemistry, immunology, physiology, medicine and landmine detection. In 2003, Czarnik outlined a way to use chemosensors to track glucose levels in diabetic patients which, along with contributions from others, created an FDA-approved implantable continuous glucose monitor.

== See also ==
- Boronic acids in supramolecular chemistry: Saccharide recognition
- Host–guest chemistry
- Molecular machine
- Molecular recognition
- Microwave chemistry sensor
- Catenanes as anion sensors
