= Kaoru Minoshima =

Japanese laser scientist

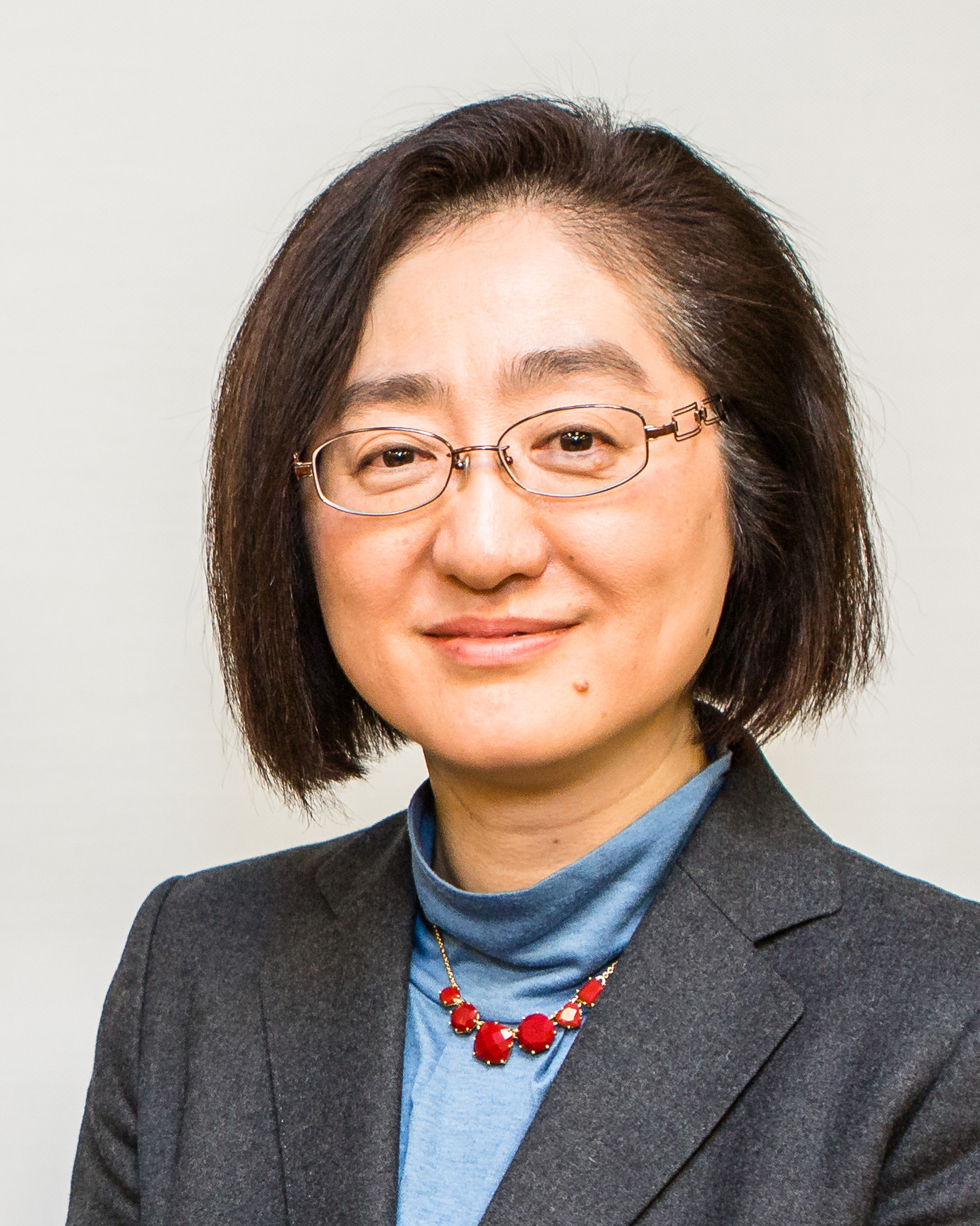
Minoshima in 2019

Kaoru Minoshima (Japanese: 美濃島 薫) is a Japanese physicist specializing in ultrashort pulse lasers and their applications in ultrafast laser spectroscopy and in the manufacture of photonic devices. She is a professor at the University of Electro-Communications in the Greater Tokyo Area, vice president of the university, and a deputy member of its board of directors.

== Education and career ==
Minoshima was a student at the University of Tokyo, where she received a bachelor's degree in 1987, master's degree in 1989, and Ph.D. in 1993.

From 1993 to 2013, she worked for the National Research Laboratory of Metrology, which in 2001 became part of the National Metrology Institute of Japan, within the National Institute of Advanced Industrial Science and Technology. In 2007, she became group leader of the National Metrology Institute of Japan.

She moved to her present position as a full professor at the University of Electro-Communications in 2013. She has been division leader in the university's Institute for Advanced Science since 2015, and directed the institute from 2021 to 2025. She was director of the university library from 2016 to 2022, has been vice president of the university since 2022, and has been a deputy member of the board of directors since 2024.

She has been a member of the IUPAP Commission on Laser Physics and Photonics since 2021, vice president of the International Commission for Optics since 2021, and vice president of the Laser Society of Japan since 2024.

== Recognition ==
Minoshima became a Fellow of the Japan Society of Applied Physics in 2014, for "advanced research on fundamental science and applied technology in metrology using ultrashort optical pulses". She became a Fellow of Optica in 2015, "for seminal contributions to advanced research on fundamental science and applied technology in precision metrology using ultrafast optics and optical frequency combs". She is also a Fellow of the Laser Society of Japan, and in 2025 was elected as a Fellow of SPIE.

She was the 2022 recipient of the Taizan Award for Laser Progress from the Laser Technology Research Institute, and one of two 2022 recipients of the 5th Light Engineering Achievement Award and Achievement Award (Keiichi Takano Award) of the Japan Society of Applied Physics.
