= Deborah Jackson =

American physicist

Deborah J. Jackson
- Born: Topeka, Kansas, U.S.
- Education: Massachusetts Institute of Technology; Stanford University
- Scientific career
- Workplaces: National Science Foundation Jet Propulsion Laboratory; RAND Corporation; Hughes Research Laboratories; IBM Bell Labs

Deborah J. Jackson is an American physicist and Program Manager at the National Science Foundation, and a Fellow of the National Society of Black Physicists. In 1980, she became the first African American woman to receive a Ph.D. in physics from Stanford University. She is an expert on "electromagnetic phenomena" with a research and development career that spans the full range of the electromagnetic spectrum from materials studies using hard x-ray wavelengths, to nonlinear optics and spectroscopy in the near-infrared, to the fielding of radio frequency instrumentation on deep space missions such as Cassini and Mars Observer.

== Early life and education ==
Jackson was born in Topeka, Kansas to a military family. She attended 13 different schools, earning her high school diploma at an international school in Brunssum, Netherlands.

She graduated with a Bachelor's in physics from Massachusetts Institute of Technology in 1974, and was the first member of her family to study science. Her role models were Prof. Margaret MacVicar and Dr. Shirley Ann Jackson. She worked summer jobs at Bell Labs, Argonne National Laboratory and as a tutor for Massachusetts Institute of Technology. She was admitted to graduate school at Cornell University, Stanford University and University of Wisconsin–Madison, but chose Stanford University because of the atmosphere - it had the largest number of African-American graduate students in physics at that time. She received a Ford Foundation Fellowship and Bell Labs Cooperative Fellowship. She earned her PhD at Stanford University in 1980, working on high resolution spectroscopy using lasers.

== Research and career ==
Jackson was a researcher at IBM Watson Research Center. At IBM she demonstrated that multi-photon ionization is coherently linked with nth order parameter processes. In 1981 she joined the Hughes Research Laboratories, developing optical devices that could be used in military applications. She specialized on Nonlinear optics and diagnostic detection techniques across the full electromagnetic spectrum. At HRL Laboratories she pioneered the integration of electronic components (including lasers and photodetectors) on very high speed integrated circuits. She had a car accident in 1988, and her recovery took 13 years. She joined the Defense Policy and Analysis group at the RAND Corporation, where she reviewed new technology in photonics between 1988 and 1992. While at RAND, she evolved a methodology for developing photonic processors.

In 1992 she joined Jet Propulsion Laboratory, where she was initially based in the Spacecraft Telecommunications group. In 1994, Jackson was appointed to the National Research Council's Committee on Women in Science and Engineering, where she served until 1998." She contributed to the Mars Global Surveyor Ultra Stable Oscillator and the Cassini–Huygens Ultra Stable Oscillator. These oscillators were like onboard clocks, and allowed the spacecraft to synchronize their communication frequencies with earth through the use of vibrating crystals. She attended the launch of Cassini–Huygens at Cape Canaveral Air Force Station . Eventually, she joined JPL's Quantum Technologies Group to work on quantum networks and learn about quantum computing. She worked on single photon detectors for use in cryptography. In 1994 she was appointed to the National Research Council committee on women in science and engineering.

She joined the National Science Foundation in 2006. As a Program Director in the Engineering Research Center (ERC) Program Office, she leads the Microelectronics, Sensors, and Information Technologies Cluster. She is an Engineering Research Center Program Director and manages the Engineering Research Center's industrial liaison officer's group. The ERCs in her management portfolio include:

Current Portfolio:

● TANMS ERC (Translational Applications of Nanoscale Multiferroic Systems), UCLA

● POETS ERC (Power Optimization of Electro-Thermal Systems), Univ. Illinois-Urbana Champaign

● NASCENT ERC (Nanomanufacturing Systems for Mobile Computing and Mobile Energy Technologies), UT-Austin

● CBBG ERC (Center for Bio-mediated and Bio-inspired Geotechnics), Arizona State University, Phoenix

● PATHS-UP ERC (Precise Advanced Technologies and Health Systems for Underserved Populations), Texas A&M University, College Station

Graduated Portfolio:

● LESA (Lighting Enabled Systems & Applications), Rensselaer Polytechnic Institute (RPI)

● CenSSIS ERC (Center for Subsurface Sensing and Imaging Systems), Northeastern Univ.

● EUV ERC (Extreme Ultraviolet Science &Technology ERC), Colorado State Univ-Ft. Collins

● QoLT ERC (Quality of Life Technologies Engineering Research Center), Carnegie Mellon Univ.

● MIRTHE ERC (Mid-Infrared Technologies for Health and the Environment), Princeton Univ.

She has also represented the National Science Foundation at the Korean Science and Engineering Foundation Forum, the African Laser Center and the National Science Teacher's Association. In 2014, she joined the founding editor board of the Translational Materials Research (TMR) Journal.

== Honours and fellowships ==
- Bell Laboratories Cooperative Research Fellow
- Ford Fellow
- Sigma Xi Fellow
- Fellow of the National Society of Black Physicists
- Senior Member of IEEE
- Chair of American Physical Society Edward A. Bouchet Award
