= Delphine Marris-Morini =

French nanoscientist and electronics engineer

Delphine Marris-Morini is a French nanoscientist and electronics engineer whose research concerns silicon photonics and photonic integrated circuits. She is a professor at Paris-Saclay University, affiliated with the CNRS Centre for Nanoscience and Nanotechnology (C2N).

== Education and career ==
Marris-Morini has an engineering degree from Télécom Paris and a master's degree from Pierre and Marie Curie University. She completed her Ph.D. in 2004 through Paris-Sud University. Her dissertation, Conception et réalisation d'un modulateur de lumière intégré en microphotonique silicium, was directed by Suzanne Laval.

She worked as a maître de conférences at the Institute of Fundamental Electronics (IEF) of CNRS and Paris-Saclay University for ten years, before becoming a professor at Paris-Saclay University in 2015. in 2016, the Institute of Fundamental Electronics merged with the Laboratory of Photonics and Nanostructures to become the Centre for Nanoscience and Nanotechnology (C2N).

== Recognition ==
Marris-Morini received the CNRS Bronze Medal in 2013 and the CNRS Silver Medal in 2026. She was a junior member of the Institut Universitaire de France from 2013 to 2018.

She was the 2017 recipient of the Fabry De Gramont prize of the Société Françiase d'Optique (French Optical Society). She was named as a Fellow of Optica in 2025.
