= Wu Lin =

Chinese politician

Member of the Legislative Yuan
- In office 1948–
- Constituency: Xikang

Personal details
- Born: 1909

Wu Lin (Chinese: 伍璘, born 1909) was a Chinese politician. She was one of the first group of women elected to the Legislative Yuan in 1948.

== Biography ==
Originally from Huili County, Wu became a member of the Second Provisional Senate of Xikang Province in 1943.

She was a candidate in Xikang in the 1948 parliamentary elections and was elected to the Legislative Yuan, while her husband Ma Yuquan was a substitute member. In the first session of the Legislative Yuan she joined the Border Affairs Committee, the Political and Local Autonomy Committee and the Education and Culture Committee.
