= Vassilia Zorba =

Greek-American plasma physicist

- Born: Greece
- Education: University of Crete
- Scientific career
- Workplaces: University of California, Berkeley; Lawrence Berkeley National Laboratory
- Thesis: Laser micro/nano-structuring of Si: Optical, Electronic and Wetting Properties (2008)

Vassilia Zorba is a Greek-American plasma physicist, group leader and professor at Berkeley Lab. Her research focuses on the development of ultrafast laser plasma spectroscopies. She specialises in femtosecond laser-matter interactions. She is a Fellow of the Royal Society of Chemistry and Optica.

== Early life and education ==
Zorba was born in Greece. She completed her undergraduate studies in the University of Crete, where she specialised in physics. She completed her master's degree and doctorate in Crete. Her doctorate considered the laser-induced micro-/nano- structuring of silicon. Femtosecond laser micromachining can be used to generate micro-/nano- structures in the optical near and far fields. In the far-field, Zorba realised water repellent biomimetic structures. Zorba joined the Lawrence Berkeley National Laboratory as a postdoc. She was part of the Environmental Energy Technology Division, and developed strategies to analyse lithium-ion batteries at high resolution. She studied ultra-thin interfacial layers to evaluate how chemical reactions that occur during charging impact battery performance after electrochemical cycling.

== Research and career ==
Zorba uses ultrafast lasers and advanced laser-based manufacturing tools for nonlinear optics, chemistry and remote sensing. In particular, she is interested in analysing the chemical content of materials and laser plasmas. This has applications in many technology areas, including energy (batteries and solar cells) as well as biomedical and nuclear security. She worked on the ChemCam (the Chemistry and Camera complex) instrument for Curiosity, which incorporated laser-induced breakdown spectroscopy.

== Awards and honours ==
- 2021 Journal of Analytical Atomic Spectrometry Emerging Investigator Lectureship
- 2024 Elected Fellow of Optica
- 2024 Photonics100 List
- 2024 Chair of LASE at SPIE Photonics West

== Select publications ==
- Lei Cheng; Ethan J Crumlin; Wei Chen; et al. (1 September 2014). "The origin of high electrolyte-electrode interfacial resistances in lithium cells containing garnet type solid electrolytes". Physical Chemistry Chemical Physics. 16 (34): 18294–18300. doi:10.1039/c4cp02921f. ISSN 1463-9076. PMID 25057850. Wikidata Q35212255.
- Richard E. Russo; Xianglei Mao; Jhanis J. Gonzalez; Vassilia Zorba; Jong Yoo (21 May 2013). "Laser ablation in analytical chemistry". Analytical Chemistry. 85 (13): 6162–6177. doi:10.1021/ac4005327. ISSN 0003-2700. PMID 23614661. Wikidata Q34686096.
- Marios Barberoglou; Vassilia Zorba; Alexios Pagozidis; Costas Fotakis; Emmanuel Stratakis (1 August 2010). "Electrowetting properties of micro/nanostructured black silicon". Langmuir. 26 (15): 13007–13014. doi:10.1021/la101138u. ISSN 0743-7463. PMID 20593795. Wikidata Q33622707.
