= Laura Marcu =

American engineer

- Education: University of Southern California, Los Angeles
- Scientific career
- Fields: Biomedical Imaging and BioPhotonics

Laura Marcu is an American scientist and a professor of biomedical engineering and neurological surgery at the University of California, Davis. She is also a Fellow of numerous professional societies: the Biomedical Engineering Society, SPIE, The Optical Society and the National Academy of Inventors.

== Career and research ==
Professor Laura Marcu received her Diploma of Engineer in Mechanical Engineering from the Polytechnic Institute of Bucharest, Romania. She did a post-graduate specialization in Spectroscopy, Laser and Plasma Physics at the University of Bucharest, Romania. Marcu obtained her M.S and Ph.D. Diploma in Biomedical Engineering from the University of Southern California, Los Angeles.

Marcu's work focuses primarily on research for development of optical techniques for tissue diagnostics. Her laboratory has developed time-resolved fluorescence spectroscopy (TRFS) and fluorescence lifetime imaging microscopy (FLIM) systems for in vivo tissue interrogation, including human patients. Her laboratory has a broad expertise in clinical translation of biophotonic technologies that play an important role in addressing challenges associate with tissue diagnostics and therapies. Her group also studies the application of semiconductor quantum dots to early detection of pathologic transformations in tissues as well as the application of ultrashort electric fields to cancer therapy.

Marcu developed a catheter probe able to image arteries inside a living heart which could help cardiologists predict heart attacks more reliably.

== Patents ==
- Single catheter system that provides both intravascular ultrasound and fluorescence lifetime imaging
- Biochemical marker detection device
- Internal biochemical sensing device
- Method for intracellular modifications within living cells using pulsed electric fields
- Time-resolved and wavelength-resolved spectroscopy for characterizing biological materials

== Awards and honors ==
- Named a fellow by the National Academy of Inventors in 2017.
- Fellow of the Optical Society in 2014 for "the development and clinical translation of fluorescence lifetime spectroscopy and imaging techniques."
- Fellow of SPIE in 2012.
- Fellow of the Biomedical Engineering Society in 2011.
- Senior Member of IEEE.
