= Tingyi Gu =

Chinese-American electronics engineer

Tingyi Gu is a Chinese and American electronics engineer known for her research on silicon photonics and nanophotonics. She is an associate professor of electrical and computer engineering at the University of Delaware.

== Education and career ==
Gu received a bachelor's degree in information technology from Shanghai Jiao Tong University in 2008. She continued her studies in electrical engineering at Columbia University, where she received a master's degree in 2010 and completed her Ph.D. in 2014, including a summer internship at Bell Labs.

After postdoctoral research at HP Labs and Princeton University, she joined the University of Delaware as an assistant professor in 2016.

== Recognition ==
Gu was a 2025 recipient of the Presidential Early Career Award for Scientists and Engineers, "for her pioneering contributions to silicon photonics, particularly in advancing hybrid nanophotonic devices for optical communication, sensing, and space applications". She was named as a 2026 Fellow of Optica, "for resolving material, nanofabrication, and systems challenges of silicon photonics with subwavelength design concepts and crystalline memory materials".
