= Francesca Parmigiani =

Italian optical engineer

Francesca Parmigiani is an Italian optical engineer, the head of the analog optical computing project for Microsoft Research Cambridge in England.

== Education and career ==
Parmigiani has a laurea (the equivalent of a master's degree) from the Polytechnic University of Milan, and a 2006 Ph.D. from the University of Southampton in England, working there in the Optical Fibre Communications Group of the Optoelectronics Research Centre.

She continued her work at the Optoelectronics Research Centre as a principal research fellow and Royal Academy of Engineering Research Fellow, before moving to Microsoft in 2018. In her initial work at Microsoft she was part of its Optics for the Cloud team, before becoming head of analog optical computing.

== Recognition ==
Parmigiani was named as a 2026 Fellow of Optica, "for her pioneering contributions to the field of high-speed optical communications and optical signal processing".
