= Odile Liboiron-Ladouceur =

Canadian electronics engineer

Odile Liboiron-Ladouceur is a Canadian electronics engineer specializing in optical computing, silicon photonics, and optical interconnects. She is a professor in the Department of Electrical & Computer Engineering at McGill University.

== Education and career ==
Liboiron-Ladouceur was an electrical engineering student at McGill University in Montreal, where she received a bachelor's degree in 1999. She moved to the United States to work as an electrical engineer; after a year working on mass storage at Teradyne in Boston and another two years working on fiber optics at Texas Instruments in Dallas, she became a graduate student at Columbia University in New York City. There, she received a master's degree in 2003 and completed her Ph.D. in 2007. Her doctoral dissertation, Optical interconnection networks: Interfacing the data plane to the physical layer, was supervised by Keren Bergman.

In 2008 she returned to McGill University as an NSERC postdoctoral fellow. She continued at McGill as a faculty member, and while an associate professor held a (tier 2) Canada Research Chair in Photonics Interconnect. She since was promoted to full professor.

== Recognition ==
Liboiron-Ladouceur received the 2018 McGill Principal’s Prize for Outstanding Emerging Researcher. She was elected as an Optica Fellow, in the 2027 class of fellows, "for pioneering contributions to integrated photonics, advancing mode-space devices, AI-enabled design, scalable optical interconnects, computing, and fabrication-robust photonic systems".
