= Lin Wu (physicist) =

Singaporean physicist

Lin Wu is a Singaporean physicist specializing in computational nanophotonics, in phononics and plasmonics at the nanoscale, in the quantum resonance of nanostructures, and in their applications in biosensors. She is an associate professor at the Singapore University of Technology and Design, in its Science, Mathematics, and Technology Cluster, and a senior scientist in the Agency for Science, Technology and Research (A*STAR) Institute of High Performance Computing.

== Education and career ==
Wu is a graduate of Nanyang Technological University, where she received a bachelor's degree with first class honours in 2005 and completed her Ph.D. in 2009. Her doctoral dissertation, Modeling Of Electron Emission - Its Physics And Novel Applications, was supervised by Lay-Kee Ricky Ang.

She worked as a researcher for A*STAR from 2009 until 2021, when she took up a joint position at the Singapore University of Technology and Design.

== Recognition ==
Wu was named as a 2026 Fellow of Optica, "for pioneering graphene-based plasmonic biosensors and quantum plasmonics, introducing plasma-inspired simulations that advanced quantum plasma modeling in solid-state systems".
