= Charles Willson Peale =

American painter, military officer, scientist, and naturalist (1741–1827)

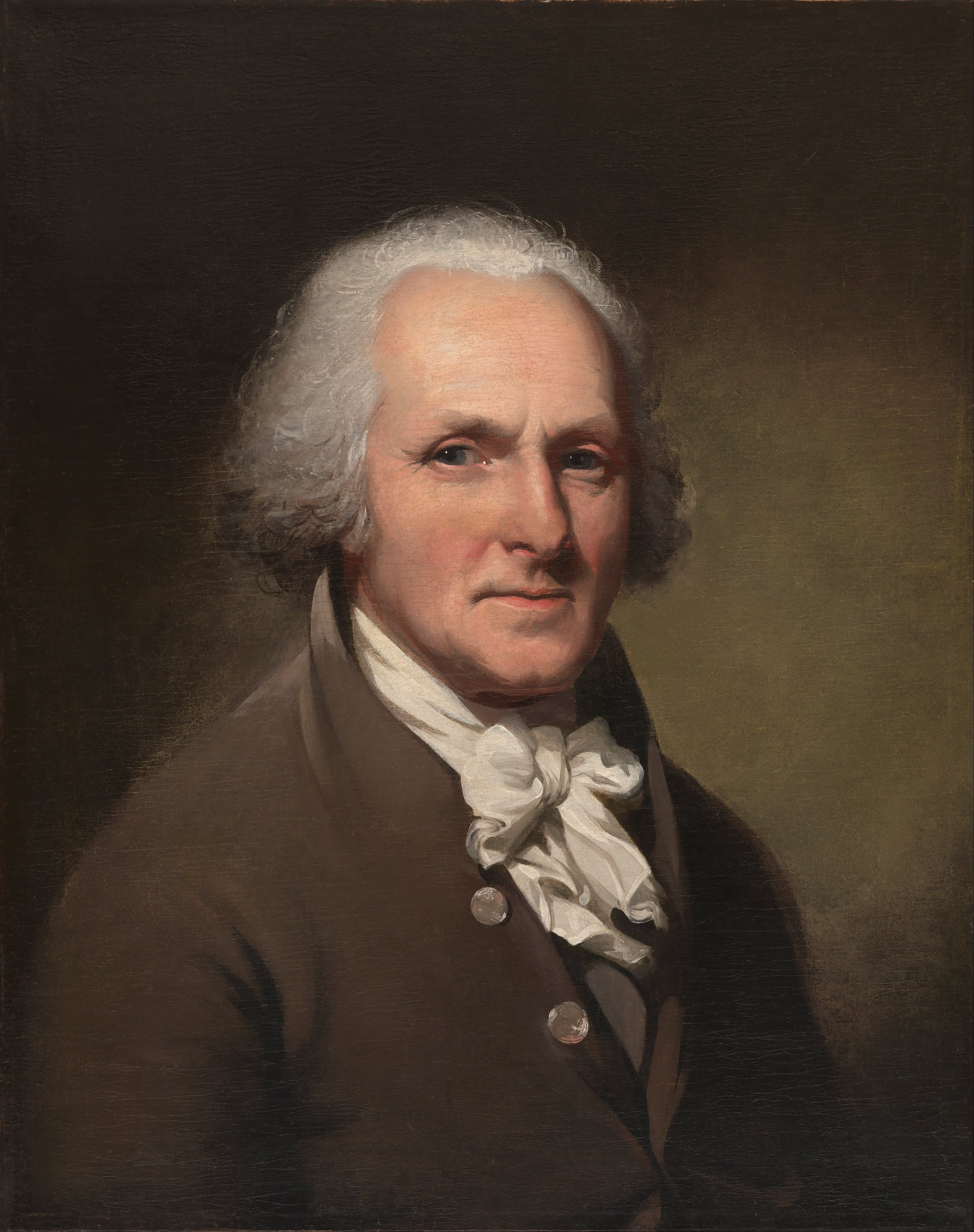
- Self-portrait, c. 1791
- Born: April 15, 1741; Queen Anne's County, Maryland, Province of Maryland, British America
- Died: February 22, 1827 (aged 85); Philadelphia, Pennsylvania, U.S.
- Resting place: Saint Peter's Episcopal Churchyard (Philadelphia, Pennsylvania)
- Known for: Painting
- Spouses: Rachel Brewer (m. 1762; died 1790) Elizabeth de Peyster (m. 1790; died 1804) Hannah Moore (m. 1805; died 1821)
- Relatives: Peale family

Charles Willson Peale (April 15, 1741 – February 22, 1827) was an American painter, military officer, scientist, and naturalist.

In 1775, inspired by the American Revolution, Peale moved from his native Maryland to Philadelphia, where he set up a painting studio and joined the Sons of Liberty. During the American Revolutionary War, Peale served in the Pennsylvania Militia and the Continental Army, participating in several military campaigns. In addition to his military service, Peale also served in the Pennsylvania State Assembly from 1779 to 1780.

Peale's portraits of leading American figures of the late 18th century are some of the most recognizable and prominent from that era. In 1784, he founded the Philadelphia Museum, one of the first American museums. More than two centuries after Peale painted his 1779 portrait Washington at Princeton — the painting sold for $21.5 million, the highest price ever paid for an American portrait.

== Early life ==
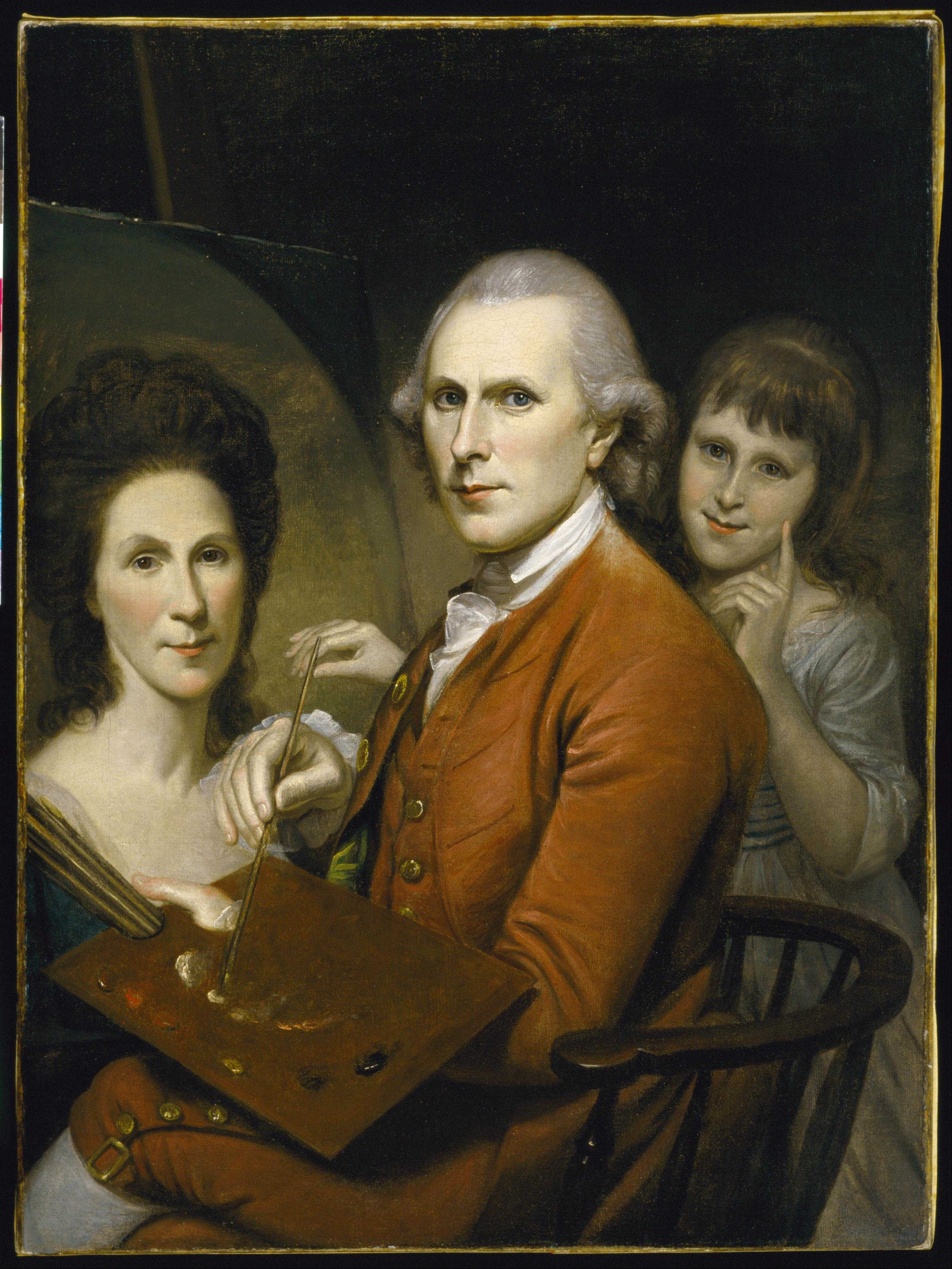
Peale's Self-portrait (c. 1782–1785) with his daughter Angelica as he works on a portrait of his wife Rachel

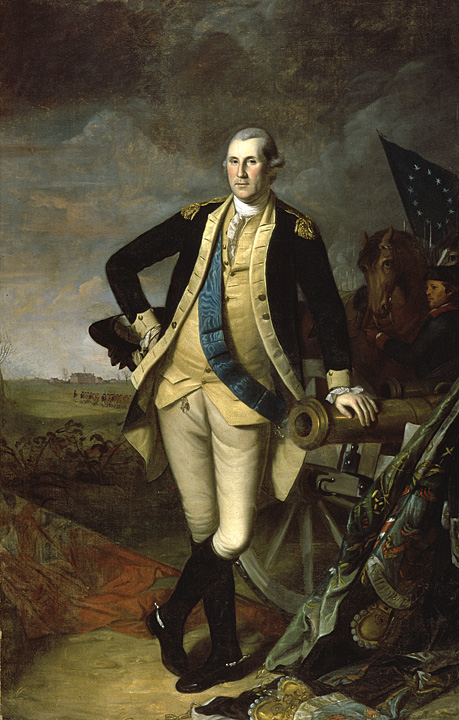
Peale's portrait Washington at Princeton (1779) sold for $21.3 million in 2005, the most ever paid for a portrait in the United States. It is now housed at Yale University Art Gallery

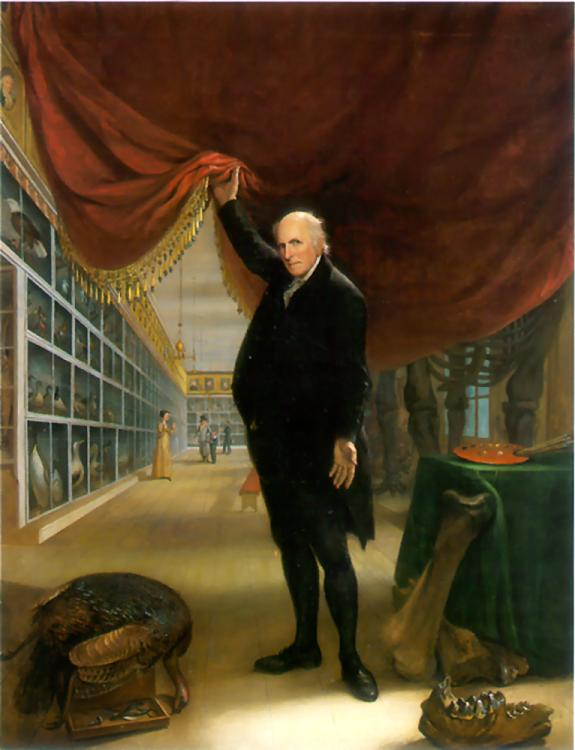
Peale's The Artist in His Museum, an 1822 self-portrait now displayed at the Pennsylvania Academy of the Fine Arts in Philadelphia

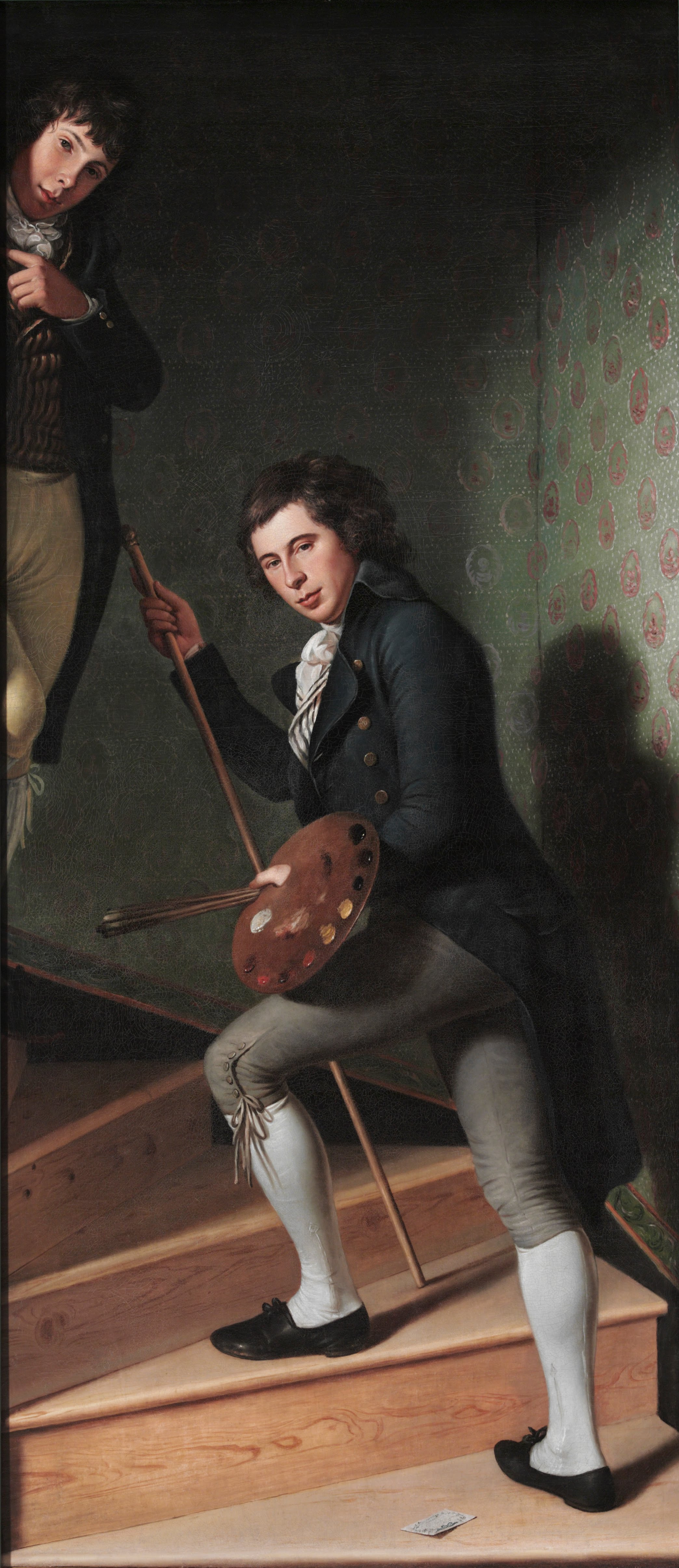
Peale's The Staircase Group (1795), a trompe-l'œil depicting his sons Raphaelle and Titian Peale I

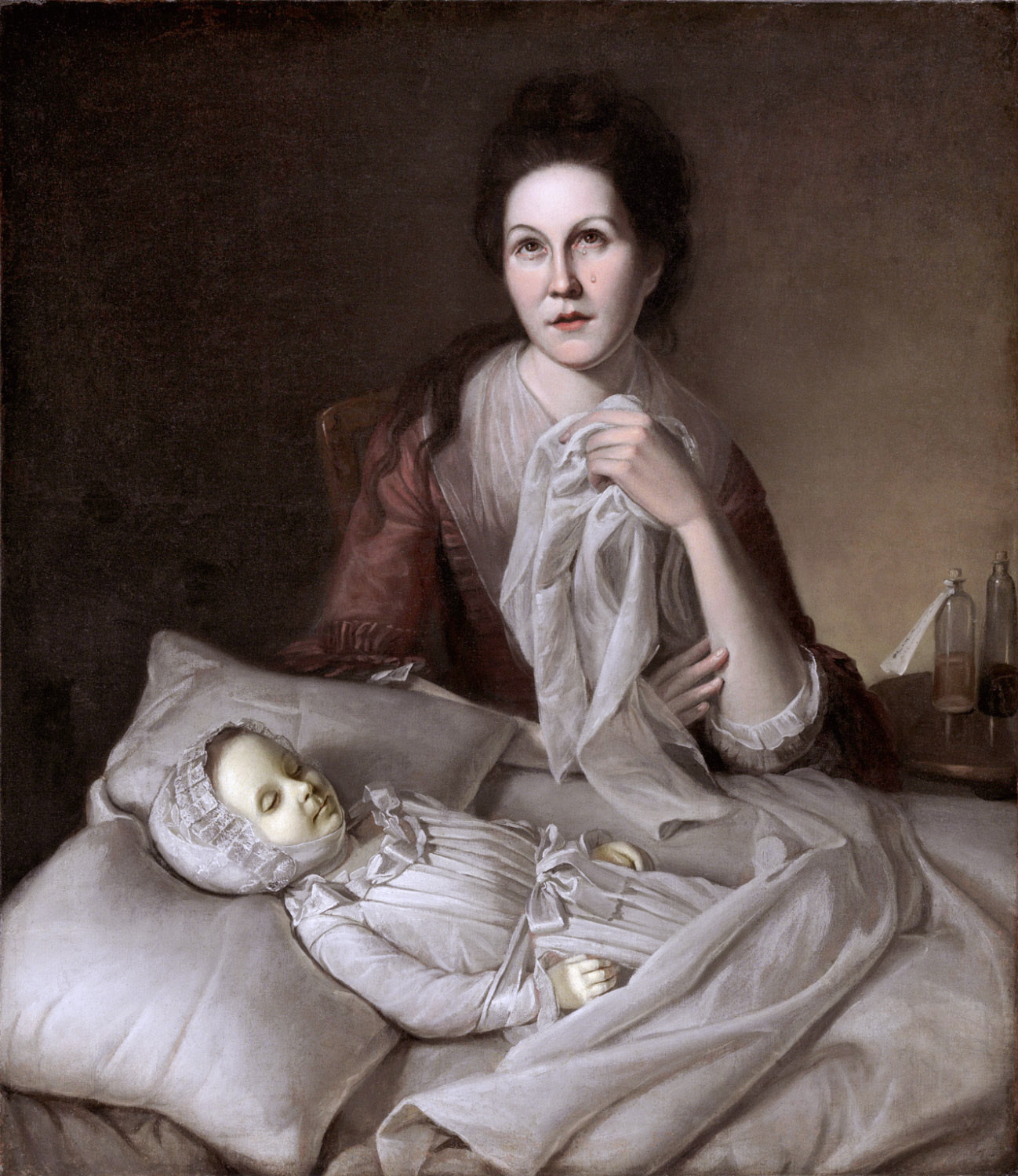
Peale's portrait of his first wife Rachel, who died in 1795, weeping over their daughter Margeret's death from smallpox

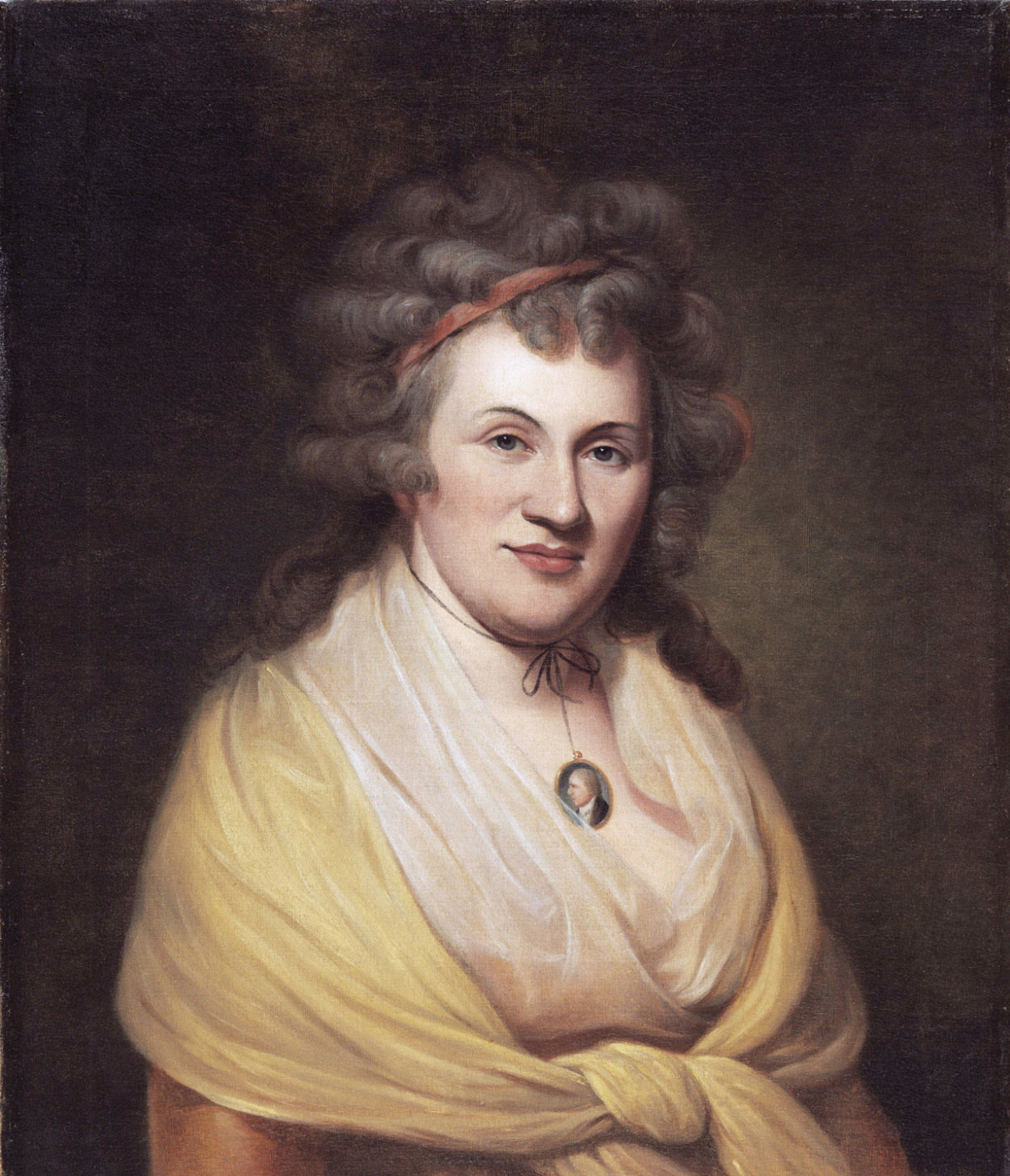
Peale's portrait of his second wife Elizabeth DePeyster Peale (1765–1804) (1798)

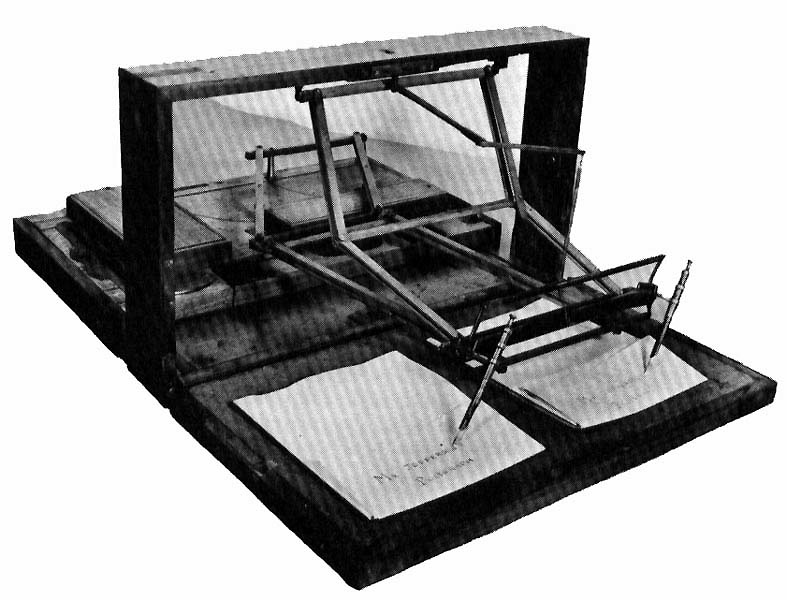
One of Peale's polygraphs used by Thomas Jefferson

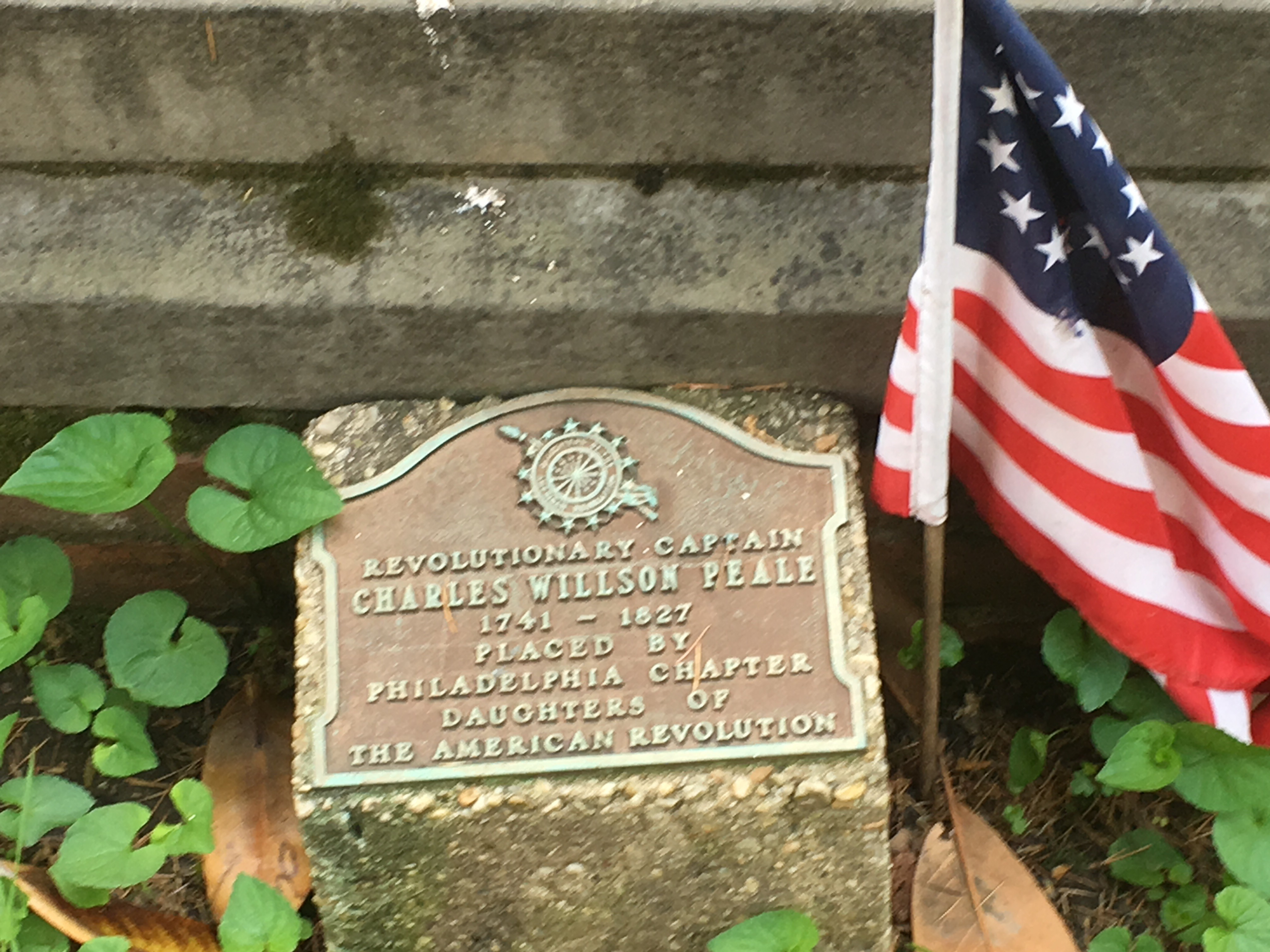
Plaque in front of Peale's gravestone in Philadelphia honoring his Revolutionary War service

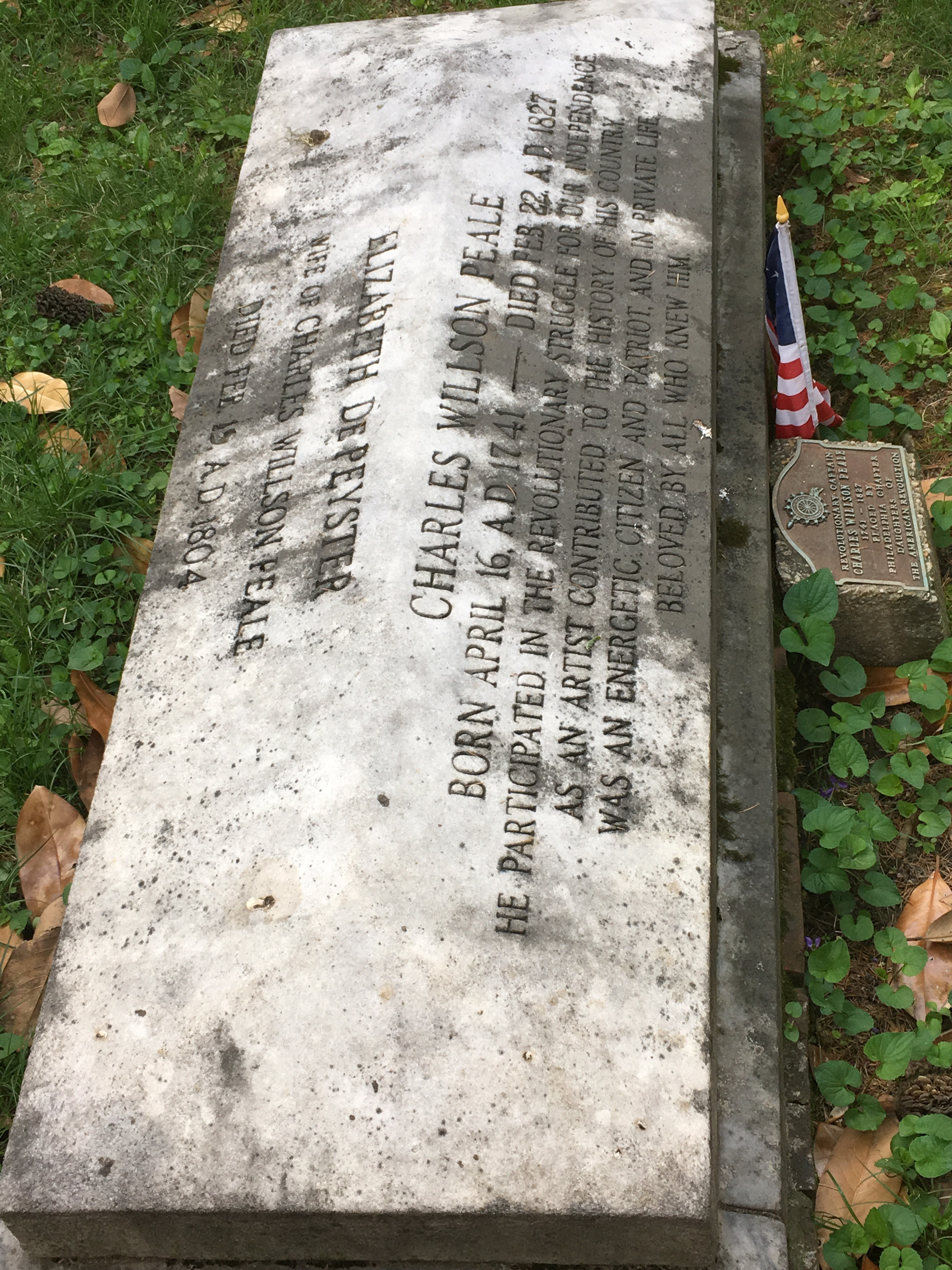
Gravestone of Peale and Elizabeth DePeyster at St. Peter's Episcopal Church in Philadelphia

Peale was born on April 15, 1741, in Queen Anne's County, Maryland. He was the son of Charles Peale (1709–1750) and his wife Margaret Triggs (1709–1791). Peale had a younger brother, James Peale (1749–1831), and was the brother-in-law of Nathaniel Ramsey, who would go on to serve as a delegate to the Congress of the Confederation.

== Career ==
Four years after his father's death in 1750, Peale, at age 13, became an apprentice to saddle maker Nathan Waters. When he reached maturity, Peale opened his own saddle shop.

In 1764, Peale joined Sons of Liberty, an organization of the Thirteen Colonies that proved influential in organizing and paving the way for the American Revolution. He proved unsuccessful in saddle making as a career and then tried fixing clocks and working with metals, but both of these endeavors also failed. He then took up painting.

Finding that he had a talent for painting, especially portraiture, Peale studied for a time under John Hesselius and John Singleton Copley. John Beale Bordley and friends eventually raised enough money for him to travel to England to take instruction from Benjamin West. Peale studied with West for three years beginning in 1767, afterward returning to North America and settling in Annapolis, Maryland. There, he taught painting to his younger brother, James Peale, who in time also became a noted artist.

=== American Revolution ===
In 1775, Peale's enthusiasm for the American Revolution and the new national government led him to move from Maryland to Philadelphia, then the national capital, where he began painting portraits of notable Americans and visitors from overseas. His estate, now located at La Salle University in Philadelphia, is open to the public. Peale also recruited troops for the Pennsylvania militia, which ultimately joined with other militias to create the Continental Army, commanded by George Washington. In the Pennsylvania militia, Peale rose to the rank of captain and participated in several battles including the Battle of Trenton and Battle of Princeton. While in combat, he painted miniature portraits of various officers in the Continental Army. He produced enlarged versions of these in later years. After the Revolutionary War, he served in the Pennsylvania state assembly for a year, from 1779 to 1780, and then returned to painting full-time in Philadelphia.

Peale was a prolific artist. He completed portraits of scores of historic figures, including Benjamin Franklin, John Hancock, Thomas Jefferson, Alexander Hamilton, James Mitchell Varnum, and George Washington. In 1771, Washington sat for a portrait with Peale, and he later sat six additional times. Using the seven portraits he painted of Washington, Peale produced close to 60 portraits of Washington. In January 2005, one of them, Peale's Washington at Princeton sold for $21.3 million (~$33.7 million in 2025), setting a record for the highest price paid for a North American portrait.

In 1794, Peale designed the first state seal of Maryland.

One of his most celebrated paintings is The Staircase Group (1795), a double portrait of his sons Raphaelle and Titian, is painted in the trompe-l'œil style and appears today in the Philadelphia Museum of Art. While interplaying with space and illusion, the painting also subtly commented on political debates about nationalism, education, and civic identity in the early America.

=== Philadelphia Museum ===
Peale had a great interest in natural history, and organized the first U.S. scientific expedition in 1801. These two major interests combined in his founding of the Philadelphia Museum in 1784, also known as Peale's museum. It housed a diverse collection of botanical, biological, and archaeological specimens, along with hundreds of pictures. In 1786, Peale was elected to the American Philosophical Society.

The museum contained a large variety of birds which Peale himself acquired, and in many instances mounted, having taught himself taxidermy. In 1792, Peale initiated a correspondence with Thomas Hall, of the Finsbury Museum, City Road, Finsbury, London proposing to purchase British stuffed items for his museum. Eventually, an exchange system was established between the two, whereby Peale sent American birds to Hall in exchange for an equal number of British birds. This arrangement continued until the end of the century. The Peale Museum was the first to display a mastodon skeleton (which in Peale's time were referred to as mammoth bones; these common names were amended by Georges Cuvier in 1800, and his proposed usage is that employed today) that Peale found in New York. Peale worked with his son to mount the skeleton for display.

The display of the mammoth bones entered Peale into a long-standing debate between Thomas Jefferson and Comte de Buffon. Buffon argued that Europe was superior to the Americas biologically, which was illustrated through the size of animals found there. Jefferson referenced the existence of these "mammoths" (which he believed still roamed northern regions of the continent) as evidence for a greater biodiversity in North America. Peale's display of these bones drew attention from Europe, as did his method of re-assembling large skeletal specimens in three dimensions.

The museum was among the first to adopt Linnaean taxonomy. This system drew a stark contrast between Peale's museum and his competitors who presented their artifacts as mysterious oddities of the natural world.

The museum underwent several moves during its existence. At various times it was located in several prominent buildings, including Independence Hall and the original home of the American Philosophical Society.

The museum eventually failed, in large part because Peale was unsuccessful at obtaining government funding. After his death, the museum was sold to, and split up by, showmen P. T. Barnum and Moses Kimball.

== Personal life ==
In 1762, Peale married Rachel Brewer (1744–1790), who bore him ten children, most of them named for Peale's favorite male and female artists. Several of his sons and daughters also pursued careers as painters, including:

- Angelica Kauffman Peale (1775–1853), who was named for Angelica Kauffman, Peale's favorite female painter
- Raphaelle Peale (1774–1825), who some consider to be the first professional American painter of still-life
- Rembrandt Peale (1778–1860), portrait painter, inventor, businessman, museum owner/operator in Baltimore. He founded the Gas Light Company of Baltimore in 1817, now Baltimore Gas and Electric Company (BGE), and was the father of artist Rosalba Carriera Peale.
- Rubens Peale (1784–1865), museum administrator and artist.
- Sophonisba Angusciola Peale (1786–1859), ornithologist. She married Coleman Sellers (1781–1834) in 1805. She was the mother of Coleman Sellers II.
- Titian Ramsay Peale I (1780–1798), ornithologist. He died at the age of 18.

After Rachel's death in 1790, Peale married Elizabeth de Peyster (1765–1804), a descendant of Johannes de Peyster, the next year. With his second wife, he had six additional children, including:

- Charles Linnaeus Peale (1794–1832), who was named for Charles Linnaeus, the Swedish botanist and zoologist
- Elizabeth De Peyster Peale (1802–1857), who married William Augustus Patterson (1792–1833) in 1820
- Franklin Peale (1795–1870), who became the Chief Coiner at the Philadelphia Mint
- Titian Ramsay Peale II (1799–1885), explorer, ornithologist, scientific illustrator, and photographer

In 1805, Peale married Hannah Moore, a Quaker from Philadelphia, who became his third wife. She helped to raise the younger children from his previous two marriages.

Peale's slave, Moses Williams, was also trained in the arts while growing up in the Peale household and later became a professional silhouette artist.

In 1810, Peale purchased a farm in Germantown, where he intended to retire. He named this estate Belfield and cultivated extensive gardens there. After Hannah's death in 1821, Peale lived with his son Rubens and sold Belfield in 1826. Peale died on February 22, 1827, and was buried at St. Peter's Episcopal Church in Philadelphia alongside his wife Elizabeth DePeyster.

== Expertise ==
A Renaissance man, Peale had expertise not only in painting but also in many diverse fields, including carpentry, dentistry, optometry, shoemaking, and taxidermy. In 1802, John Isaac Hawkins patented the second official physiognotrace, a mechanical drawing device, and partnered with Peale to market it to prospective buyers. Peale sent a watercolor sketch of the physiognotrace, along with a detailed explanation, to Thomas Jefferson. The drawing is now held with the Jefferson Papers in the Library of Congress.

Around 1804, Peale obtained the American patent rights to the polygraph from its inventor John Isaac Hawkins, about the same time as the purchase of one by Thomas Jefferson. Peale and Jefferson collaborated on refinements to this device, which enabled a copy of a handwritten letter to be produced simultaneously with the original.

Peale wrote several books. Two of these were An Essay on Building Wooden Bridges (1797) and An Epistle to a Friend on the Means of Preserving Health (1803).

== Legacy and honors ==
- Three of his sons, Rembrandt Peale, Raphaelle Peale, and Titian Ramsay Peale, became noted artists.
- The World War II cargo Liberty Ship S.S. Charles Willson Peale was named in his honor.

== Notable works ==
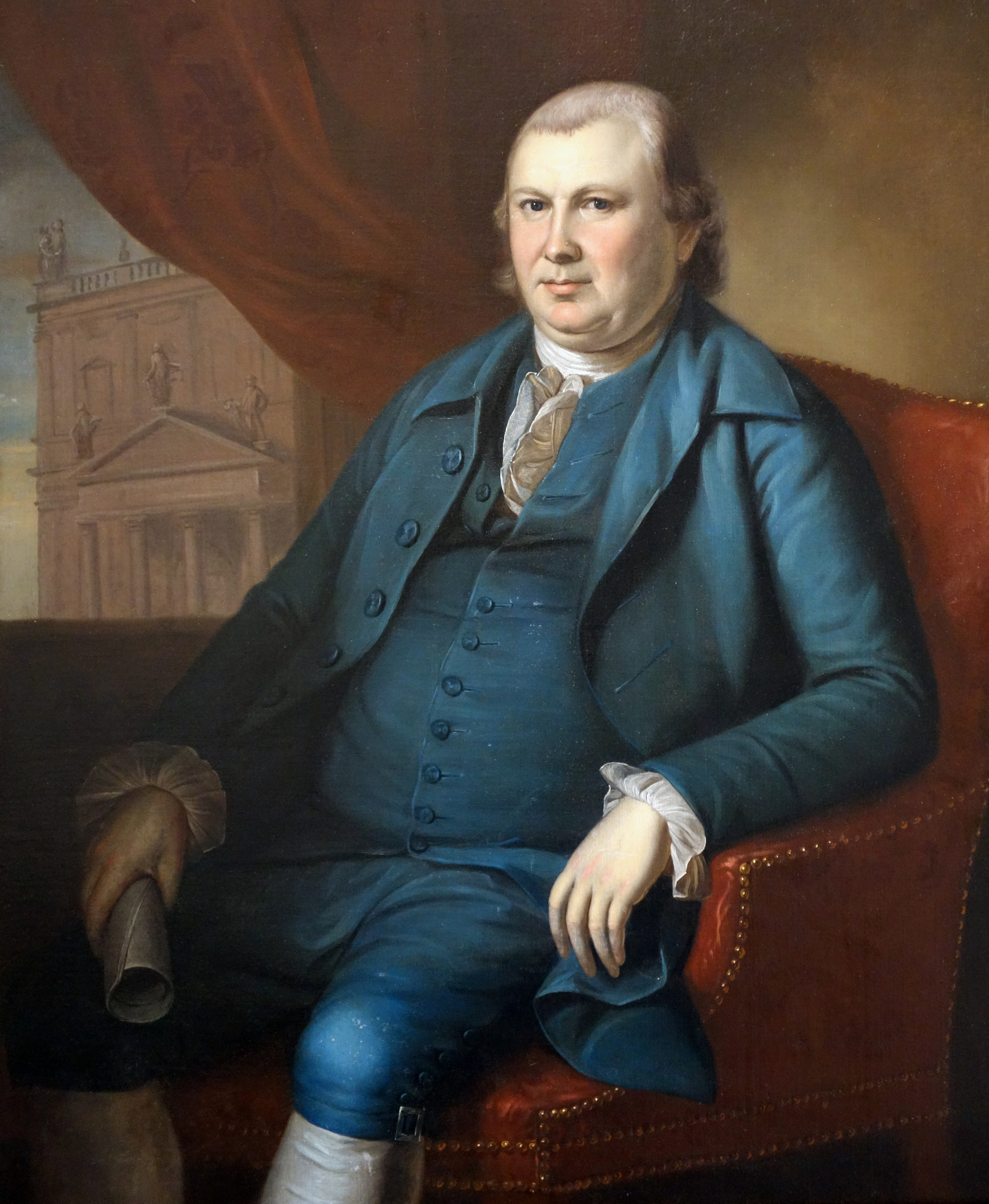
Robert Morris (1763)

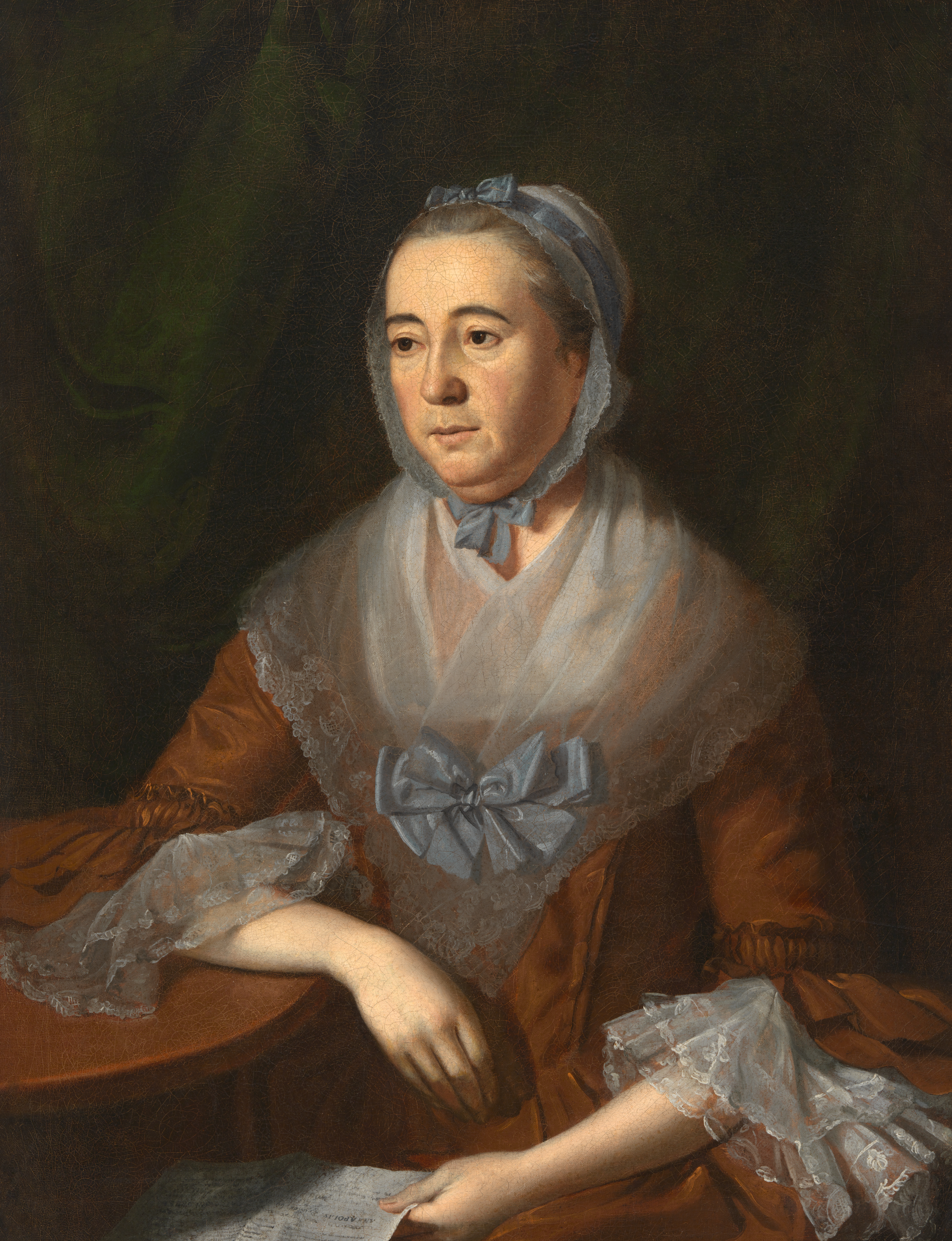
Anne Catherine Hoof Green (1769)

John Beale Bordley (1770)

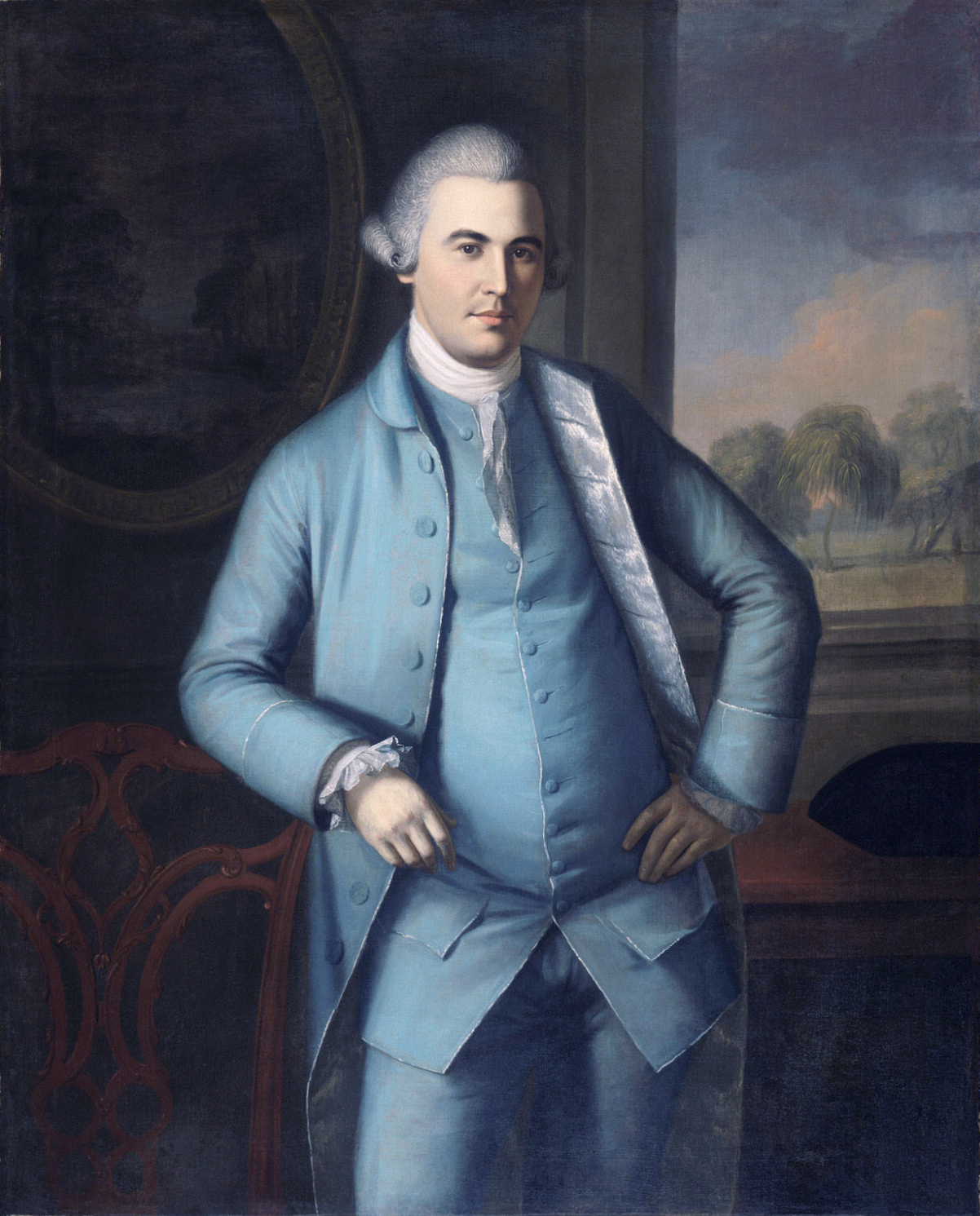
Lambert Cadwalader (1771)

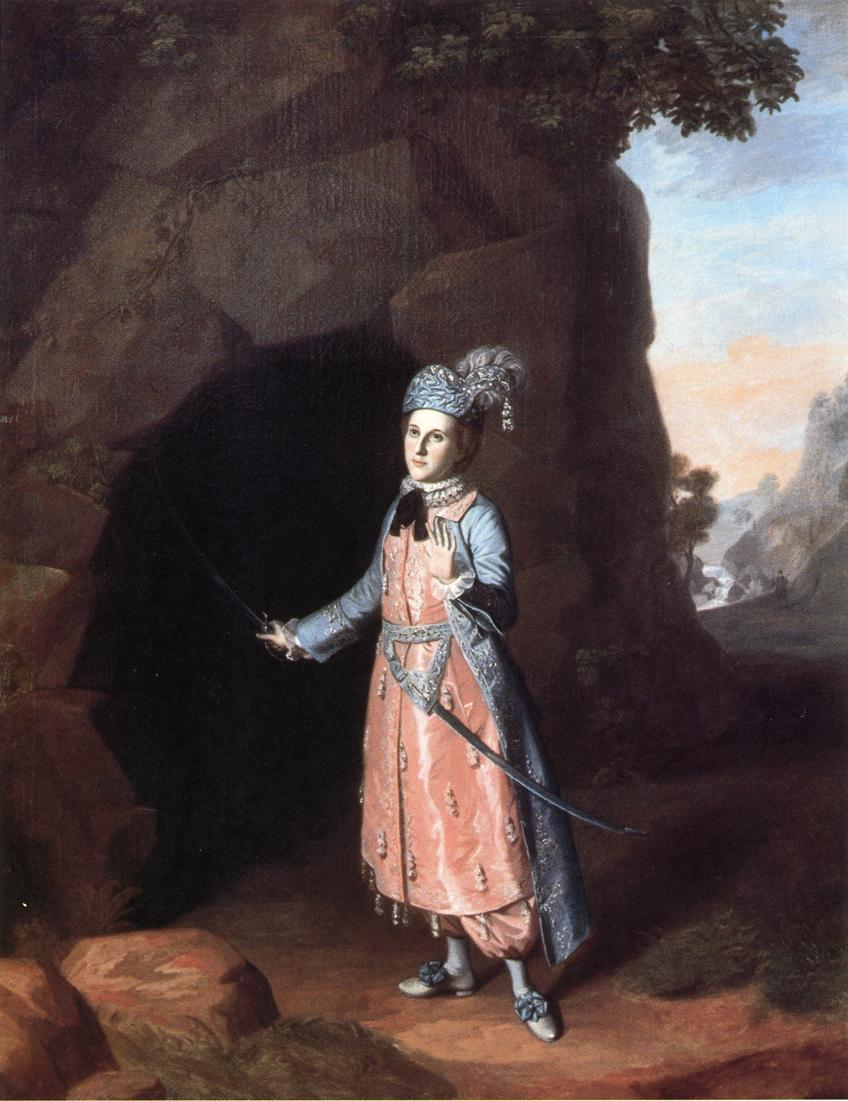
Nancy Hallam as Fidele in Shakespeare's Cymbeline (1771)

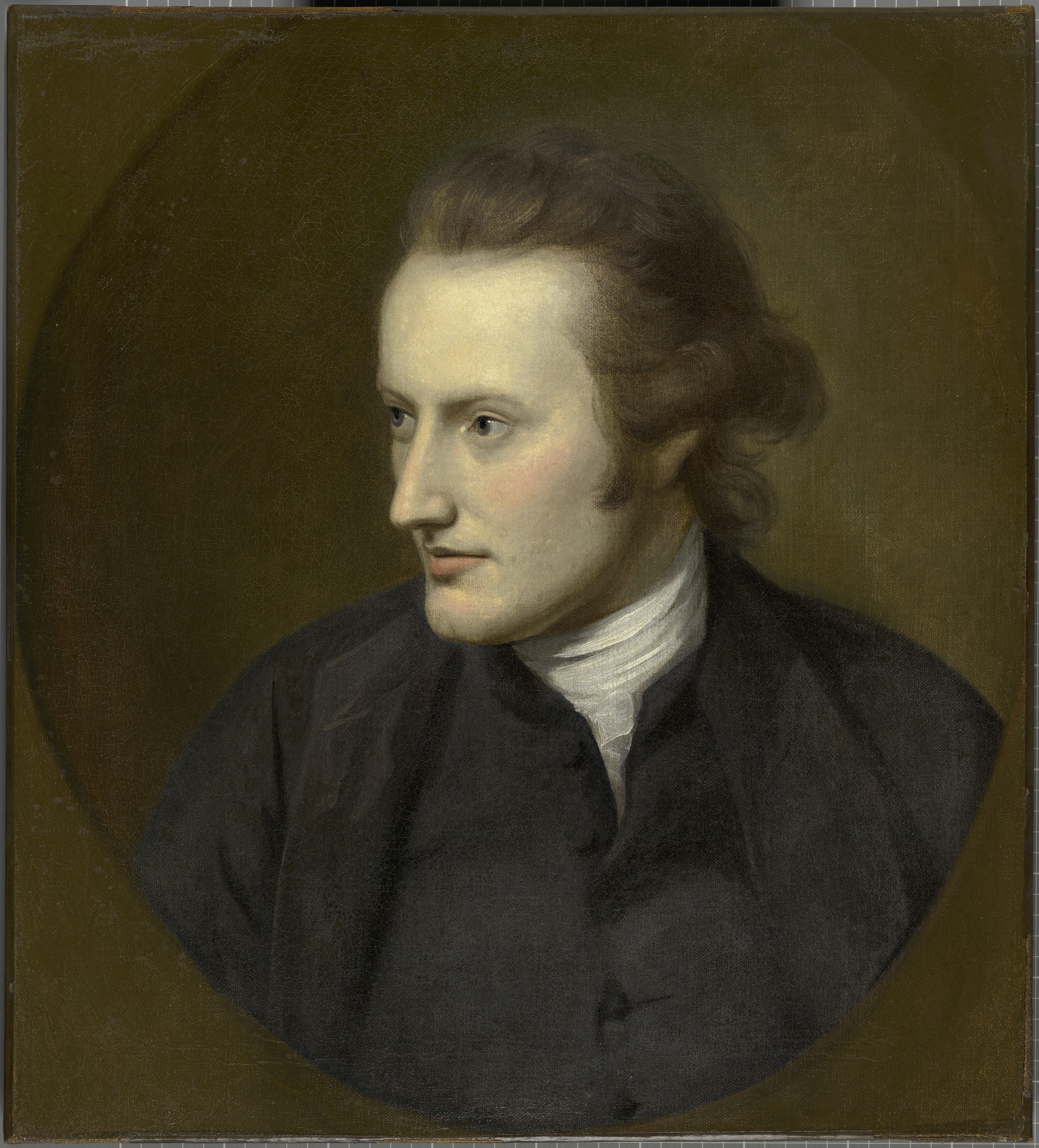
David Ramsay (1771)

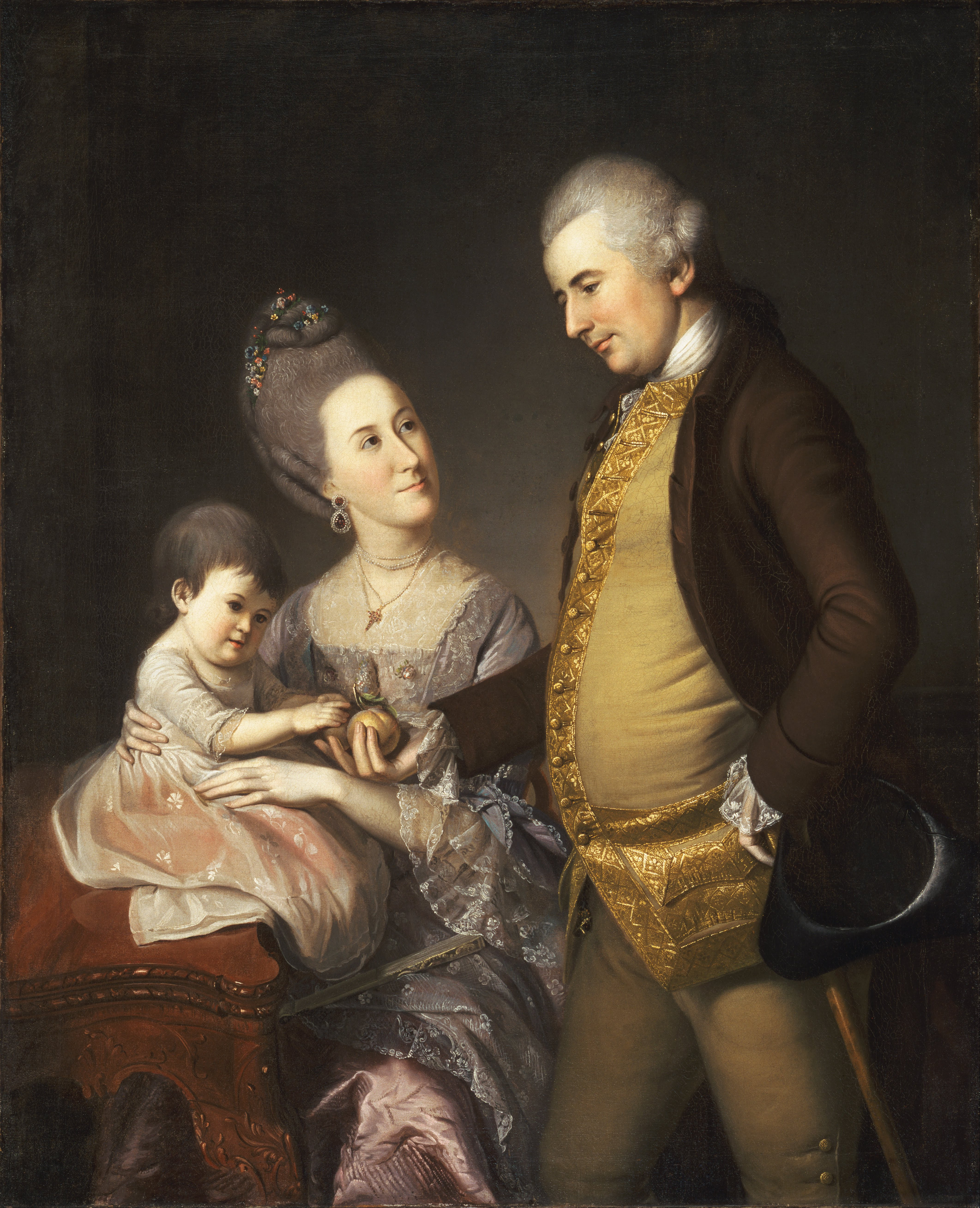
Portrait of John and Elizabeth Lloyd Cadwalader and their Daughter Anne (1772)

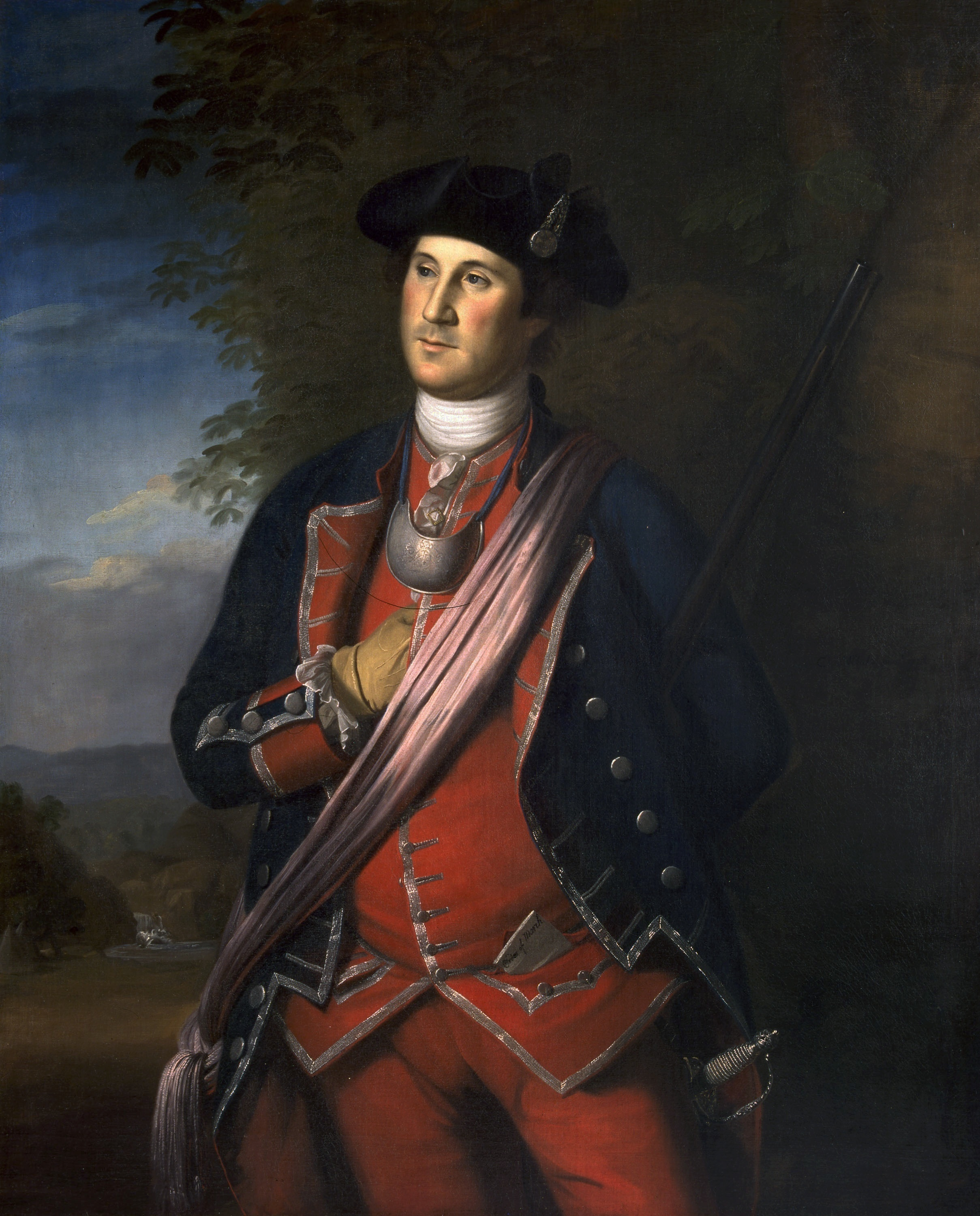
George Washington in uniform, as colonel of the First Virginia Regiment (1772)

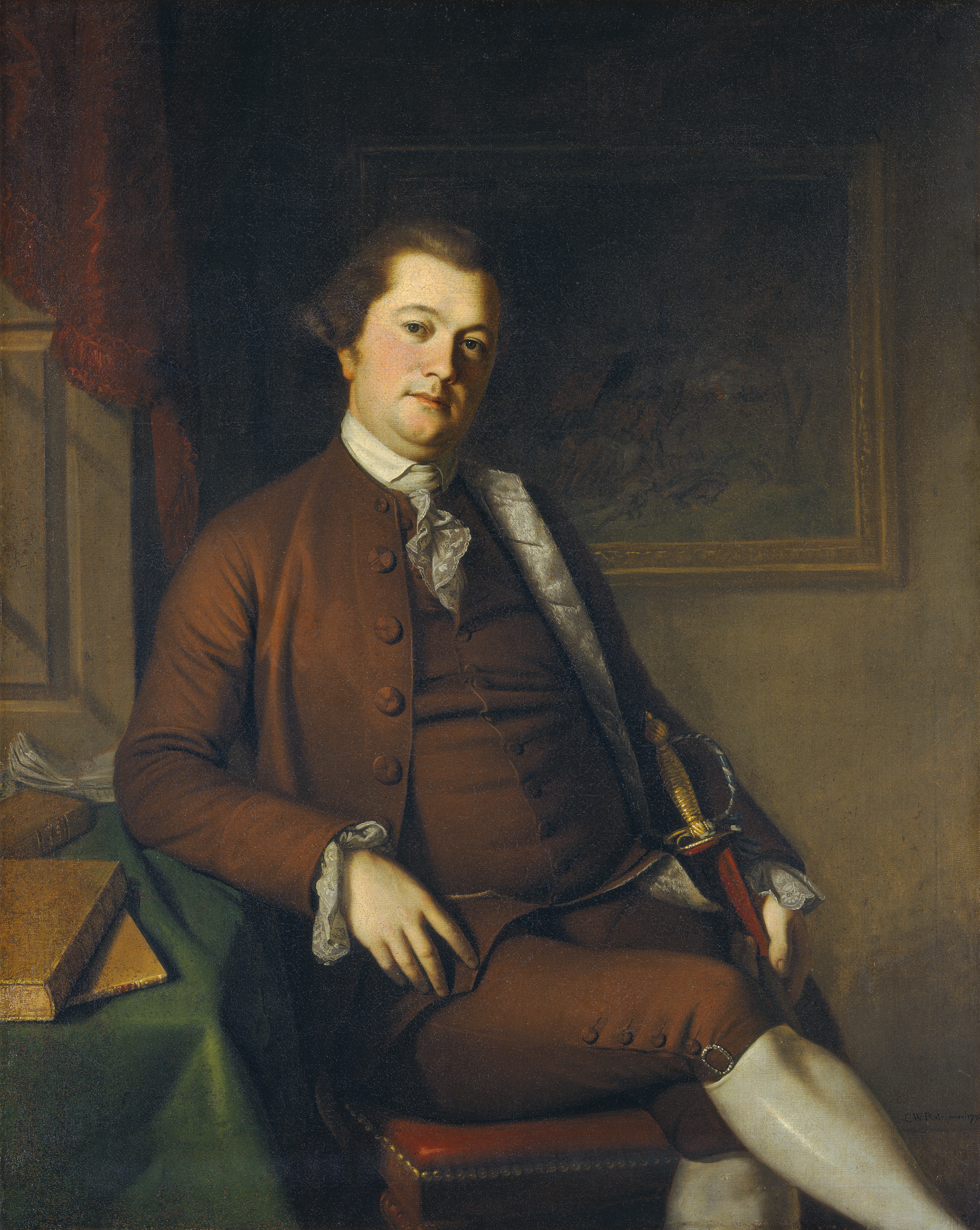
John Philip de Haas (1772)

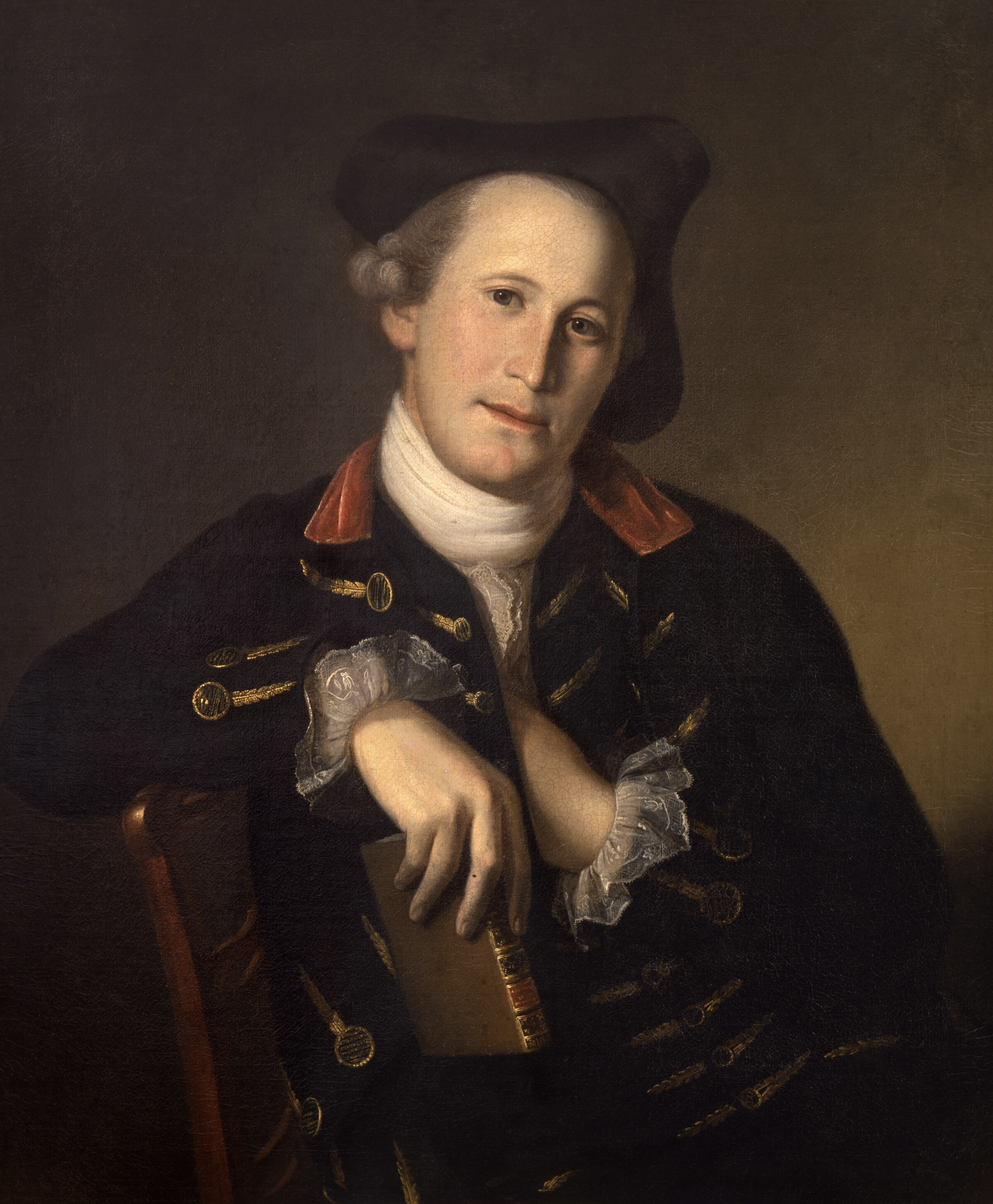
Mordecai Gist (1774)

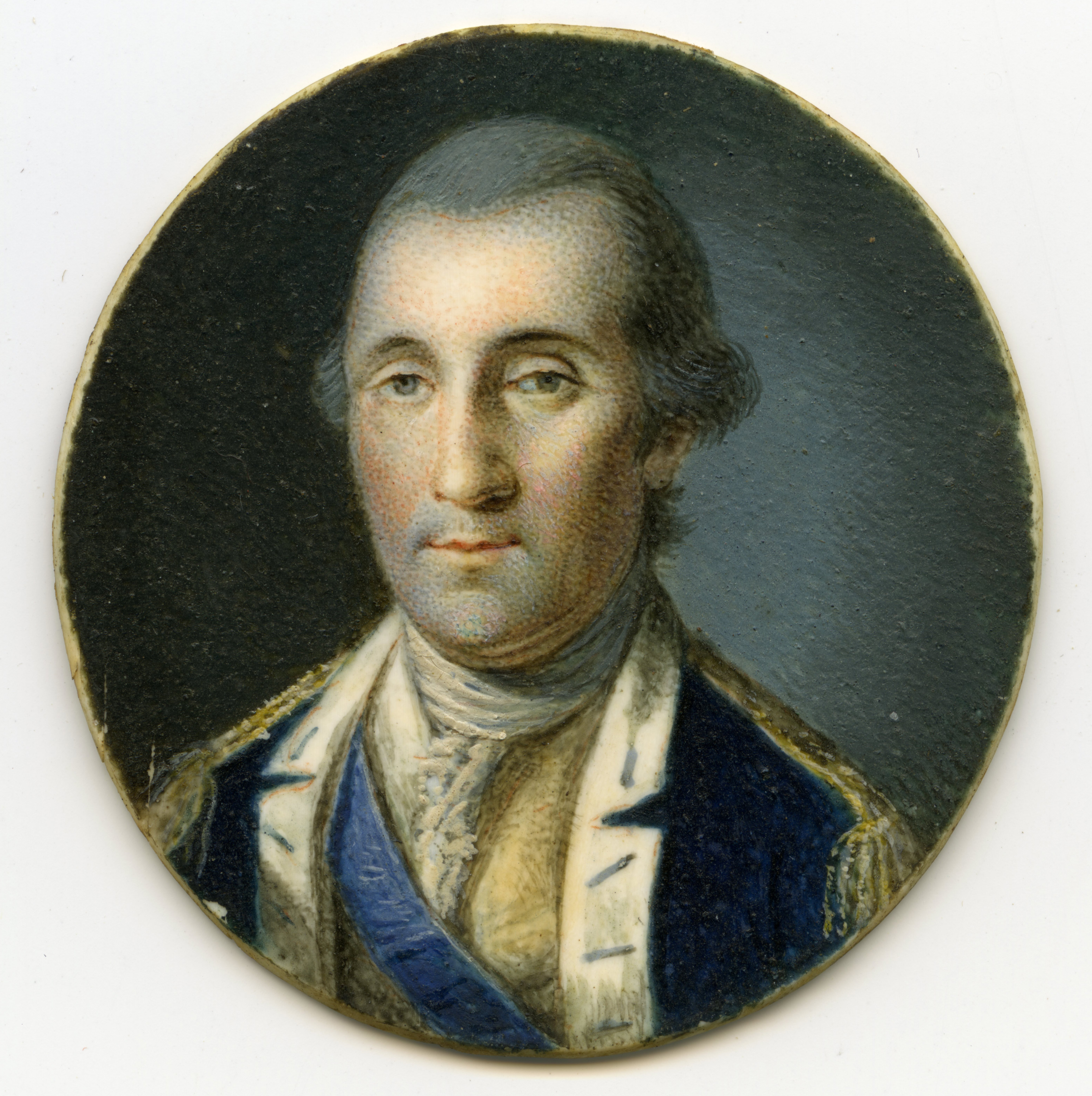
Miniature portrait of George Washington (1775–76)

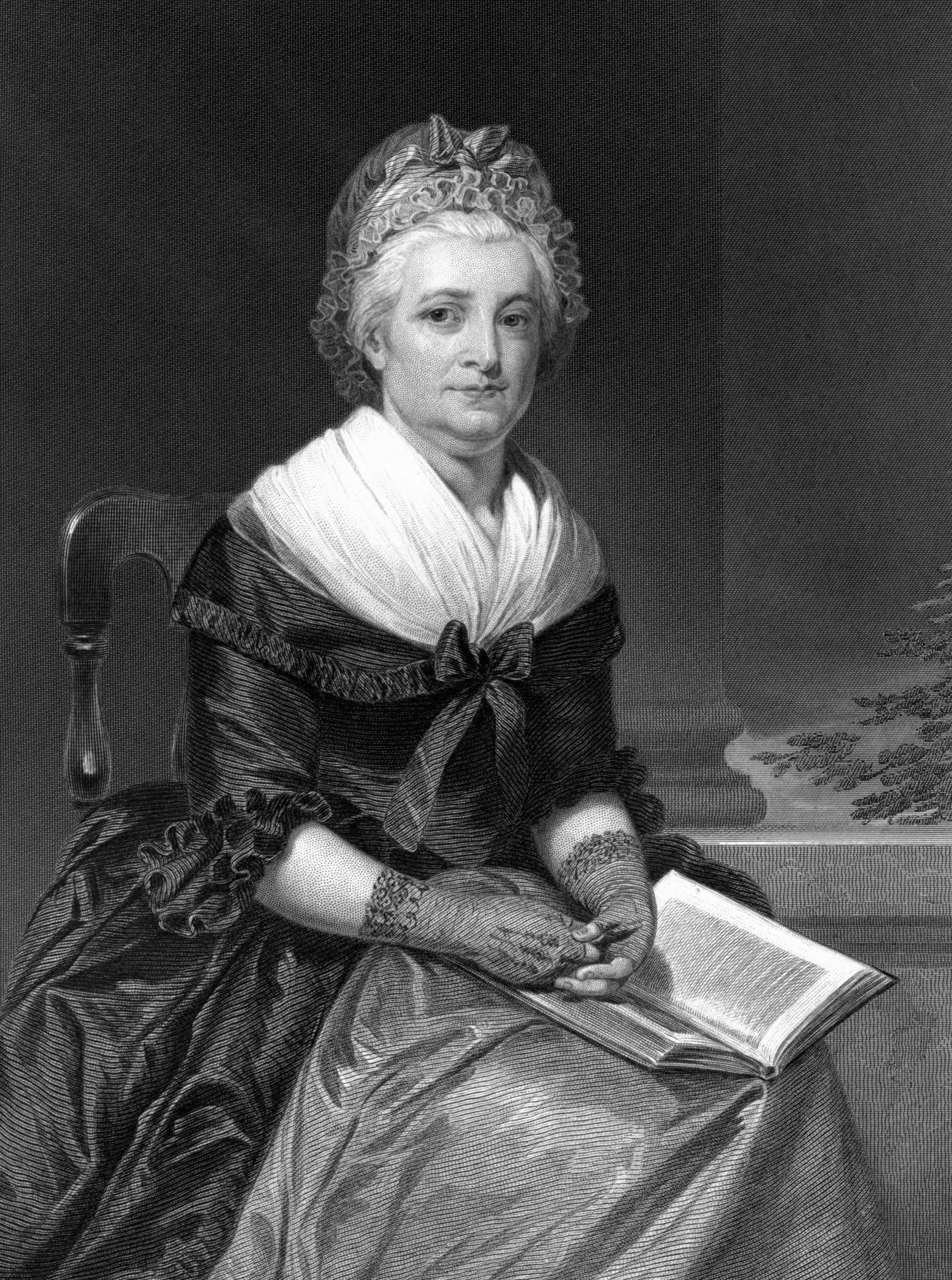
Locket Engraving of Martha Washington (1776)

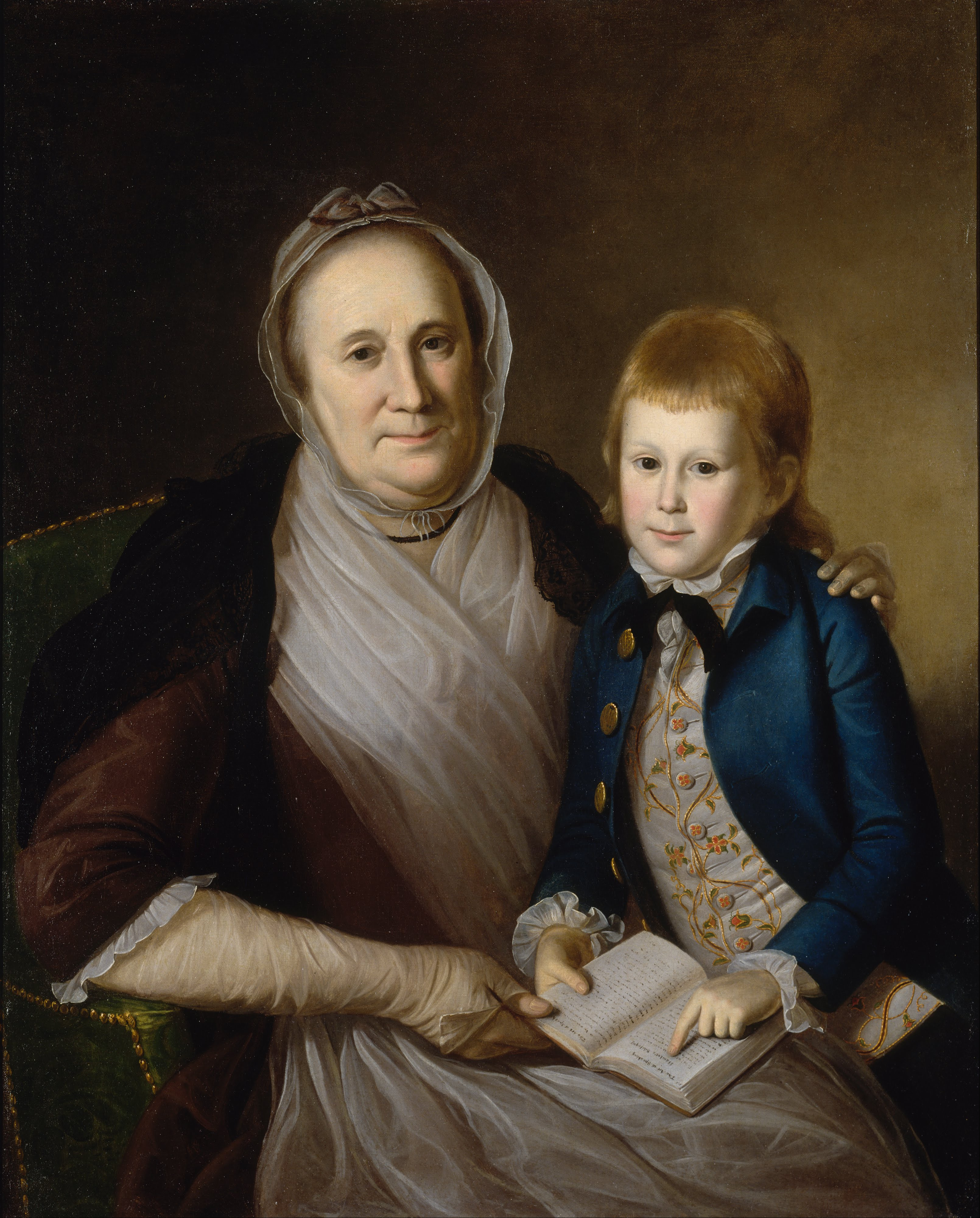
Mrs. James Smith and Grandson (1776) (see William Smith)

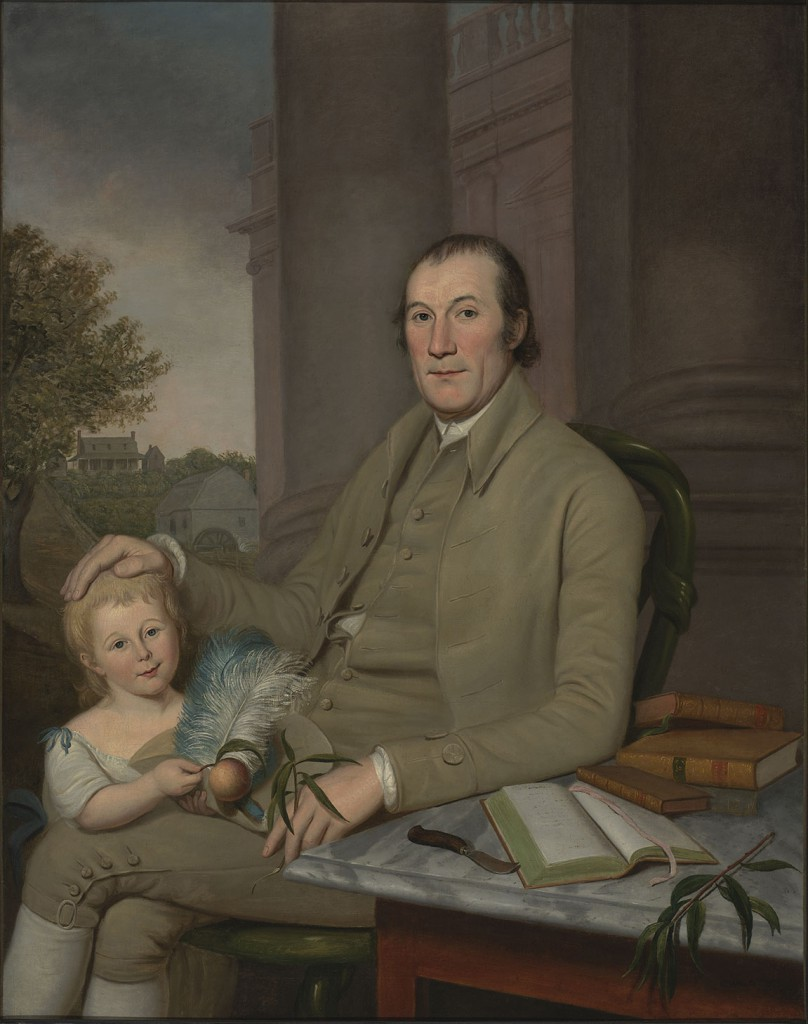
William Smith and his grandson Robert Smith Williams

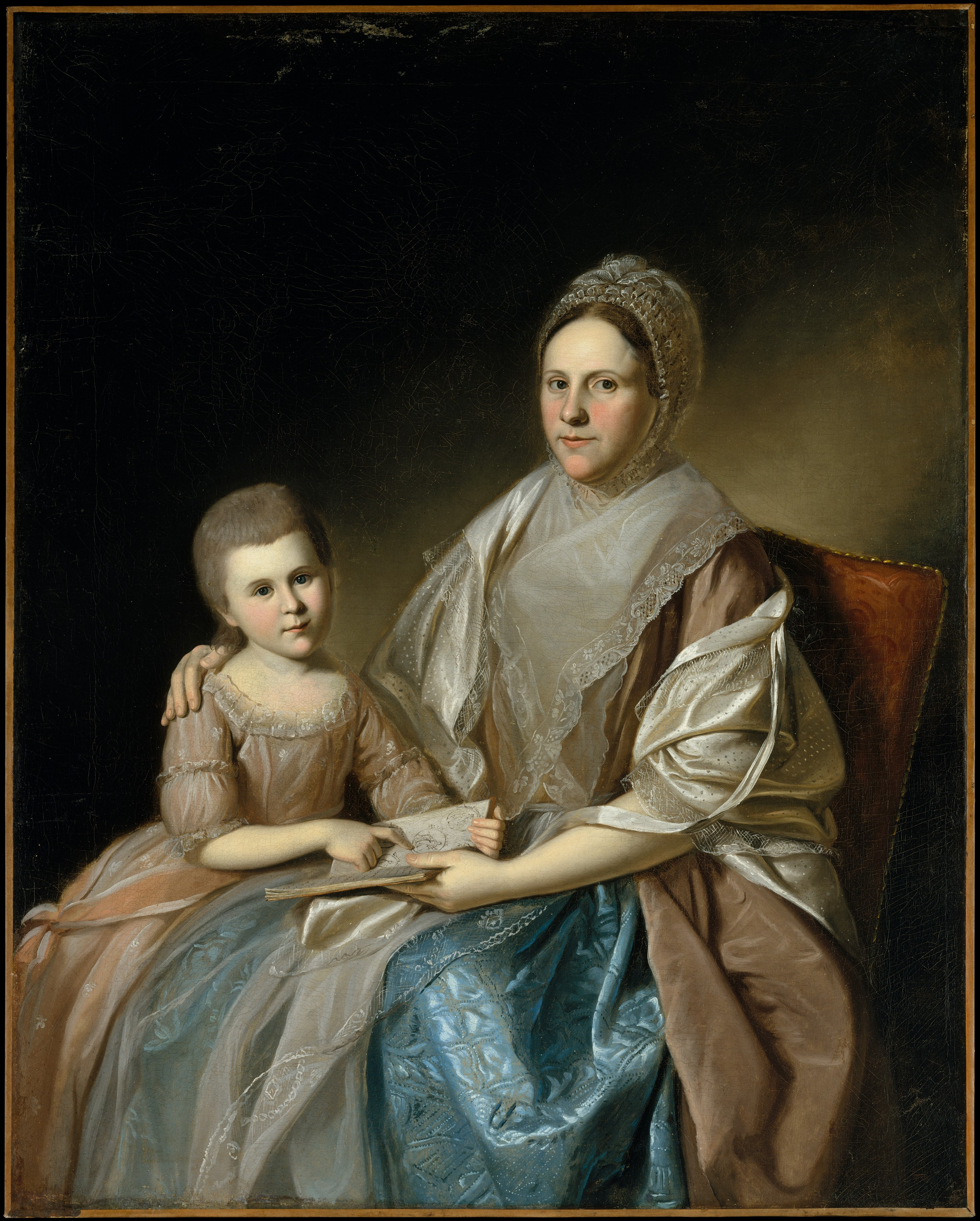
Mrs. Samuel Mifflin and Her Granddaughter Rebecca Mifflin Francis (1777–1780)

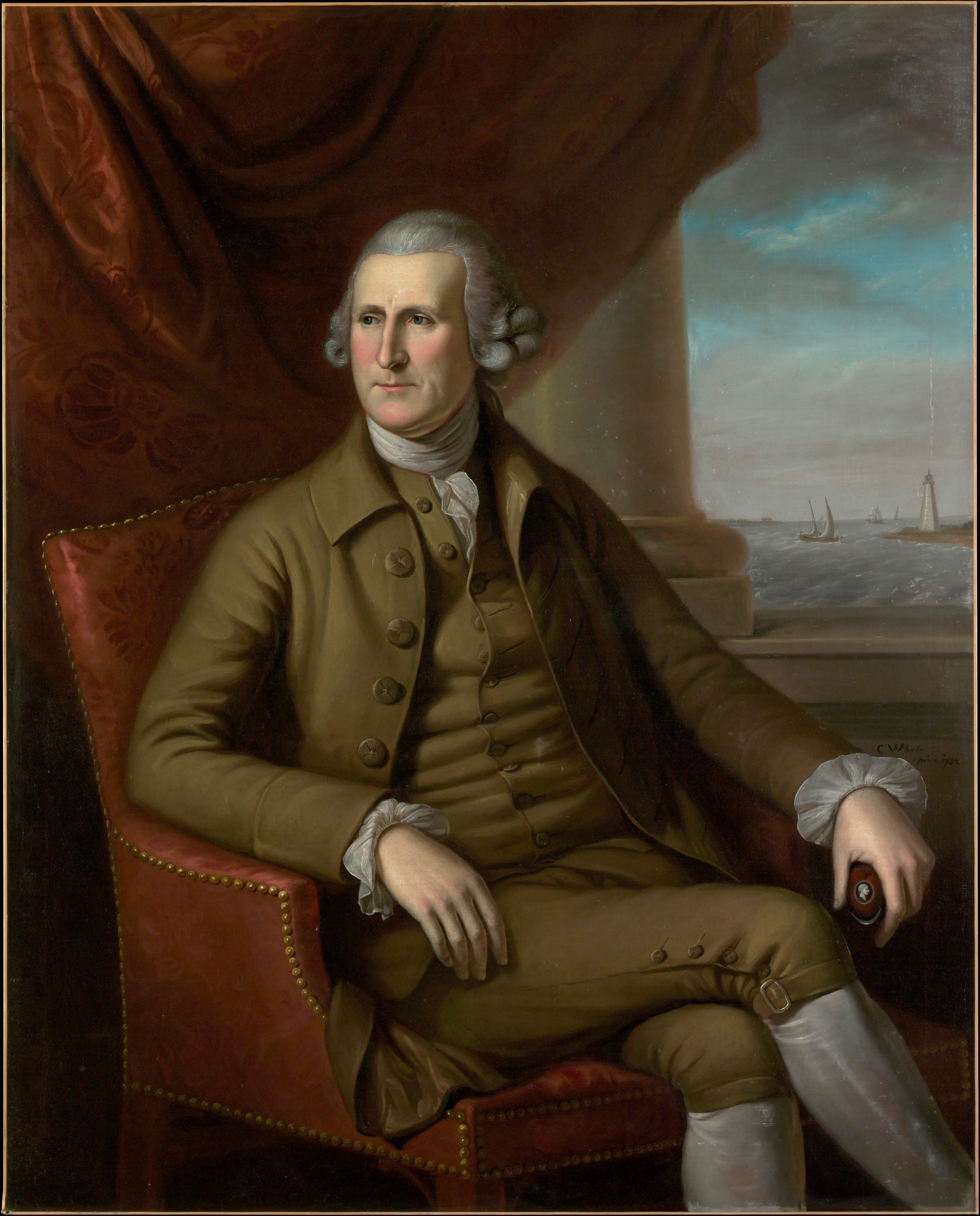
Portrait of Thomas Willing (1782)

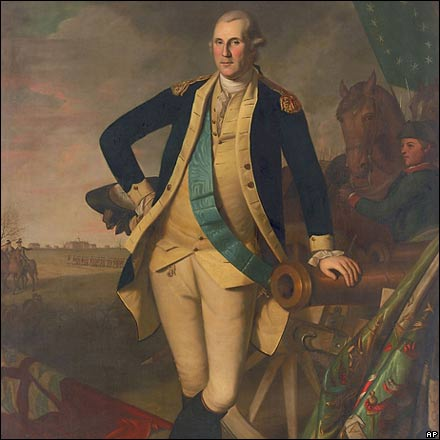
Portrait of George Washington (1779)

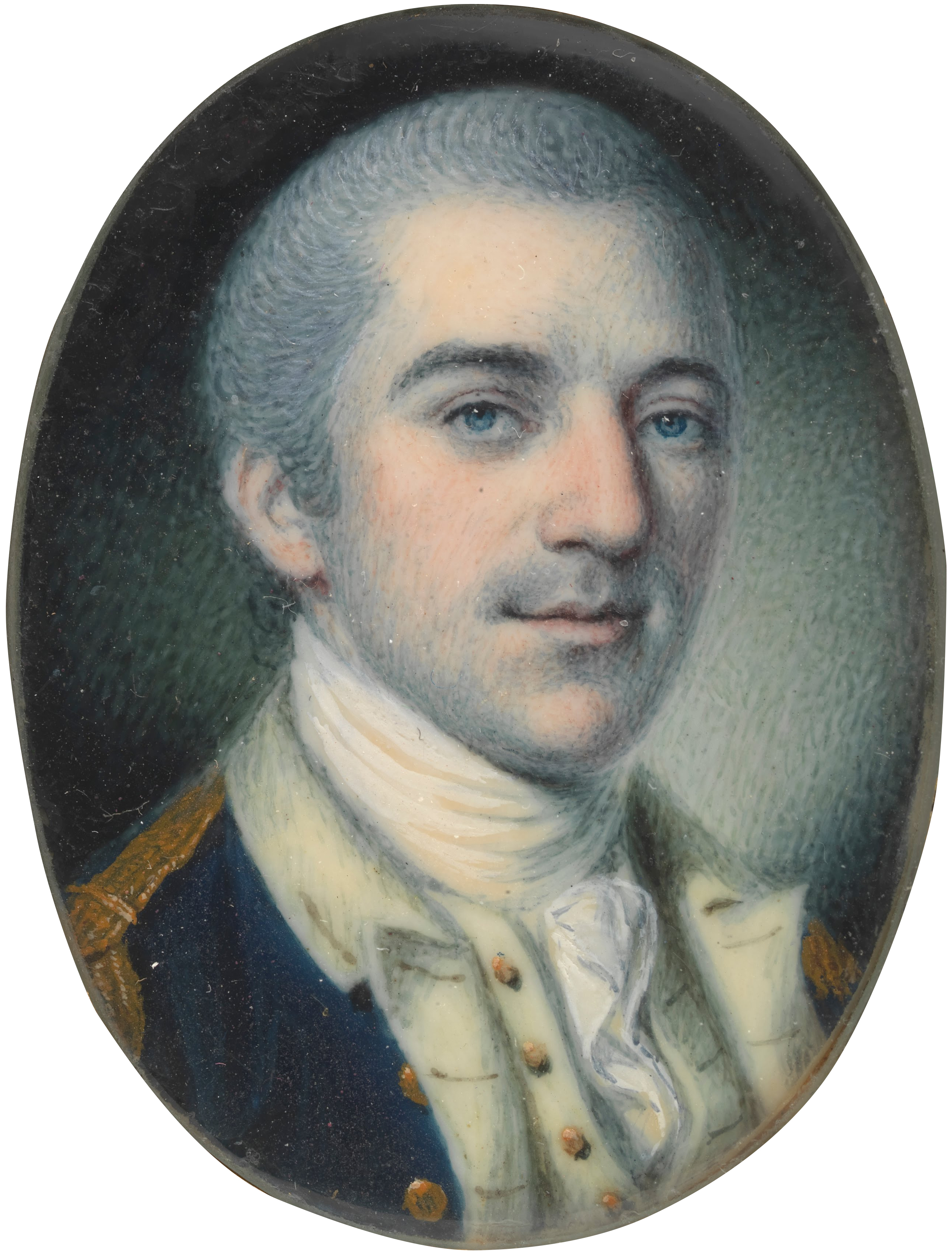
Miniature of John Laurens (1780)

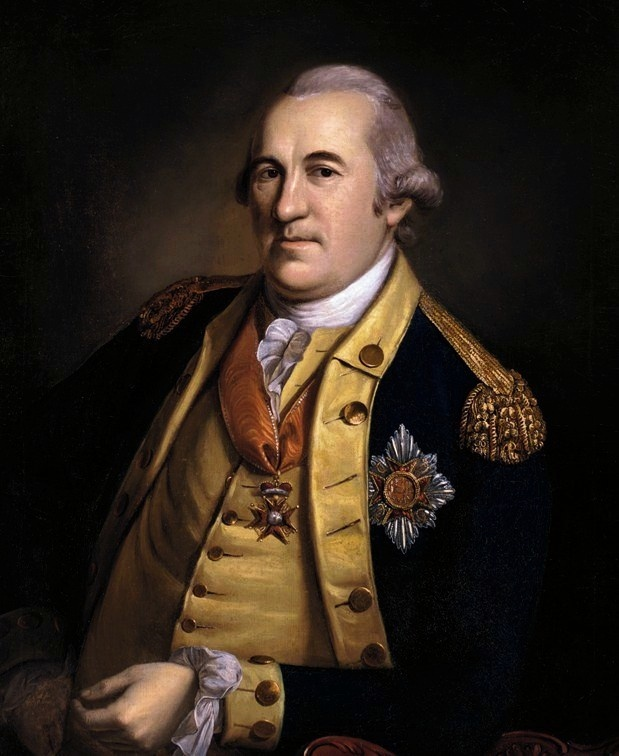
Baron Frederick William von Steuben (1780)

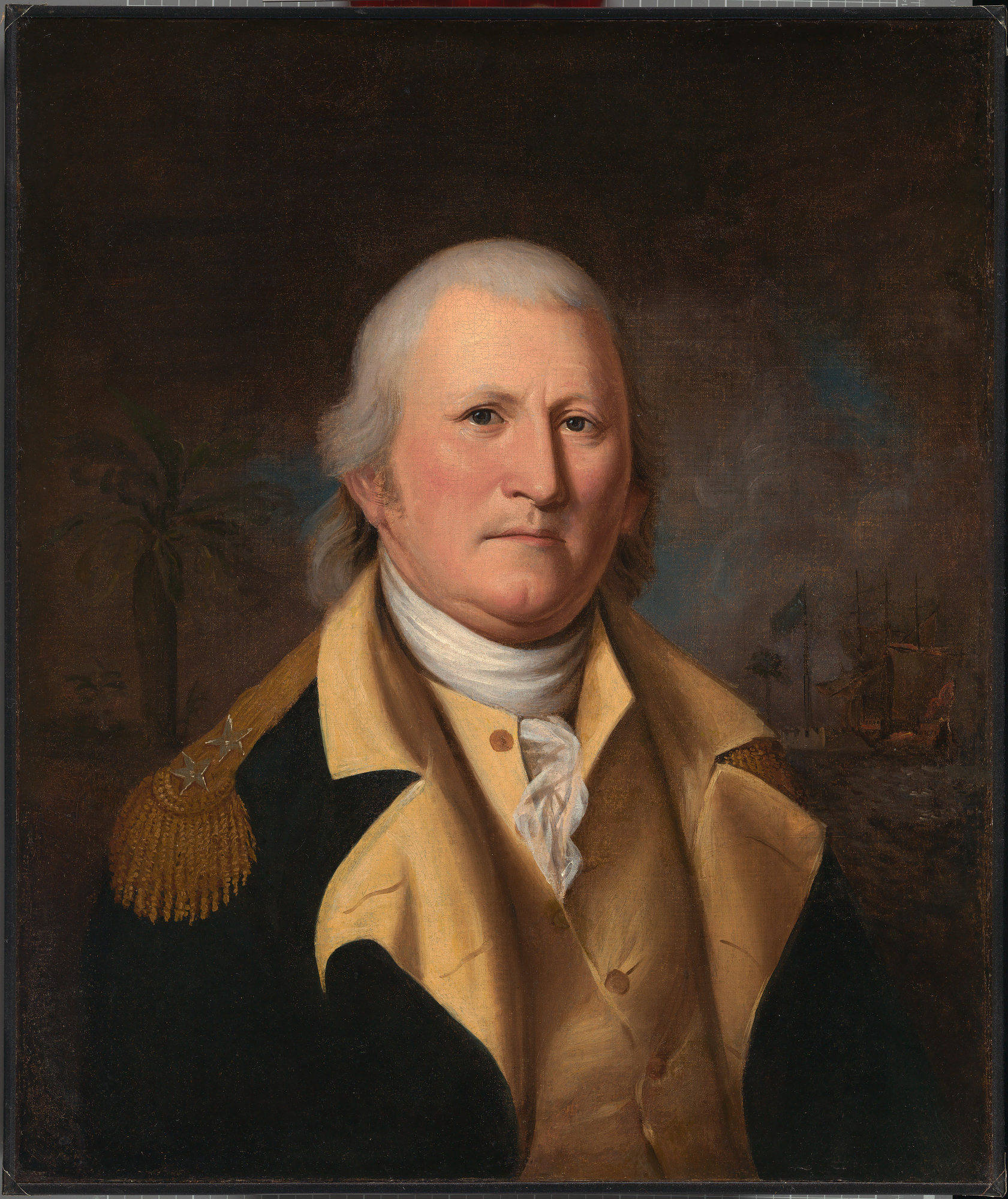
William Moultrie (1782)

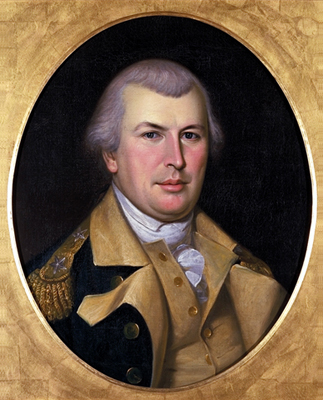
Nathanael Greene (1783)

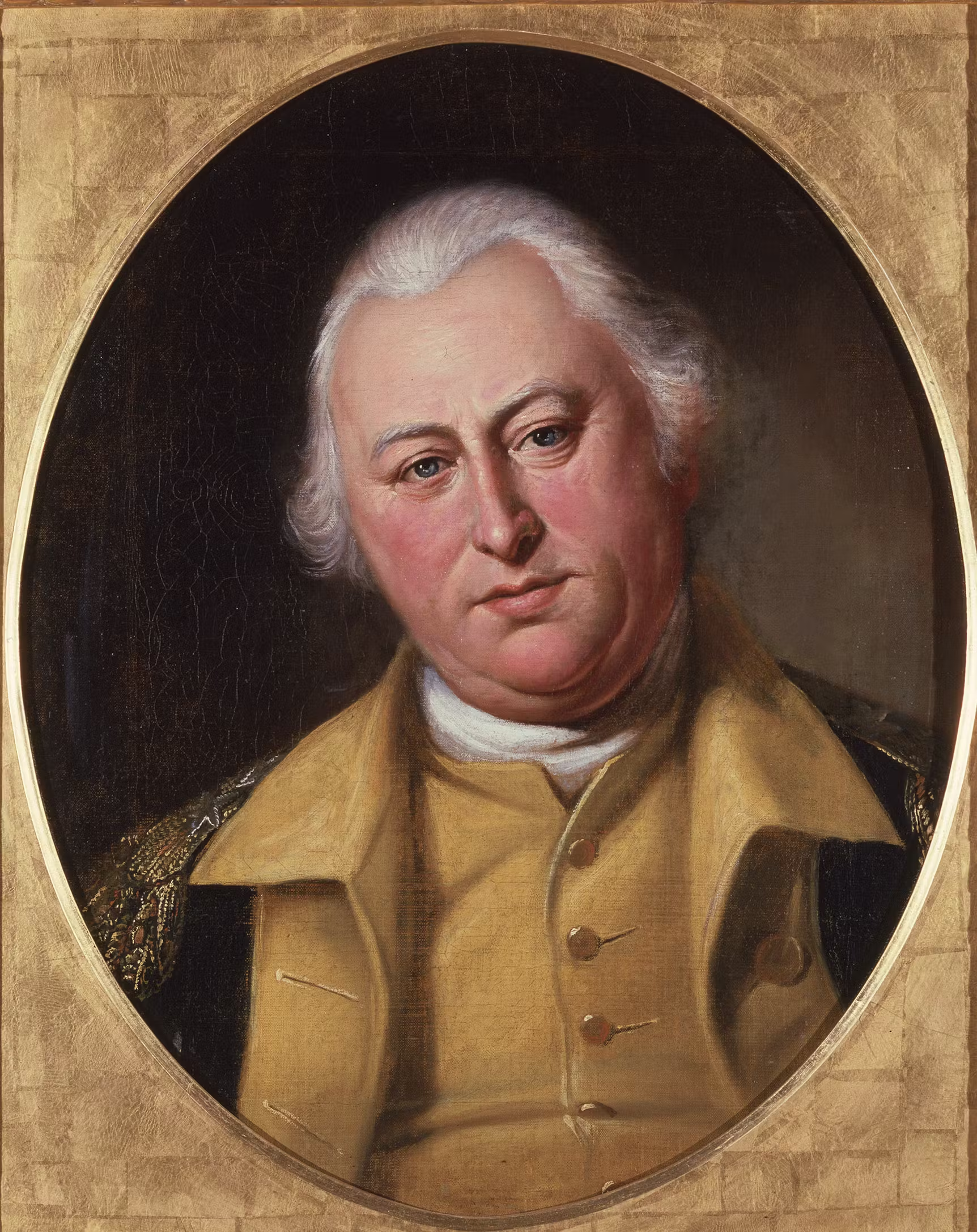
Benjamin Lincoln (1784)

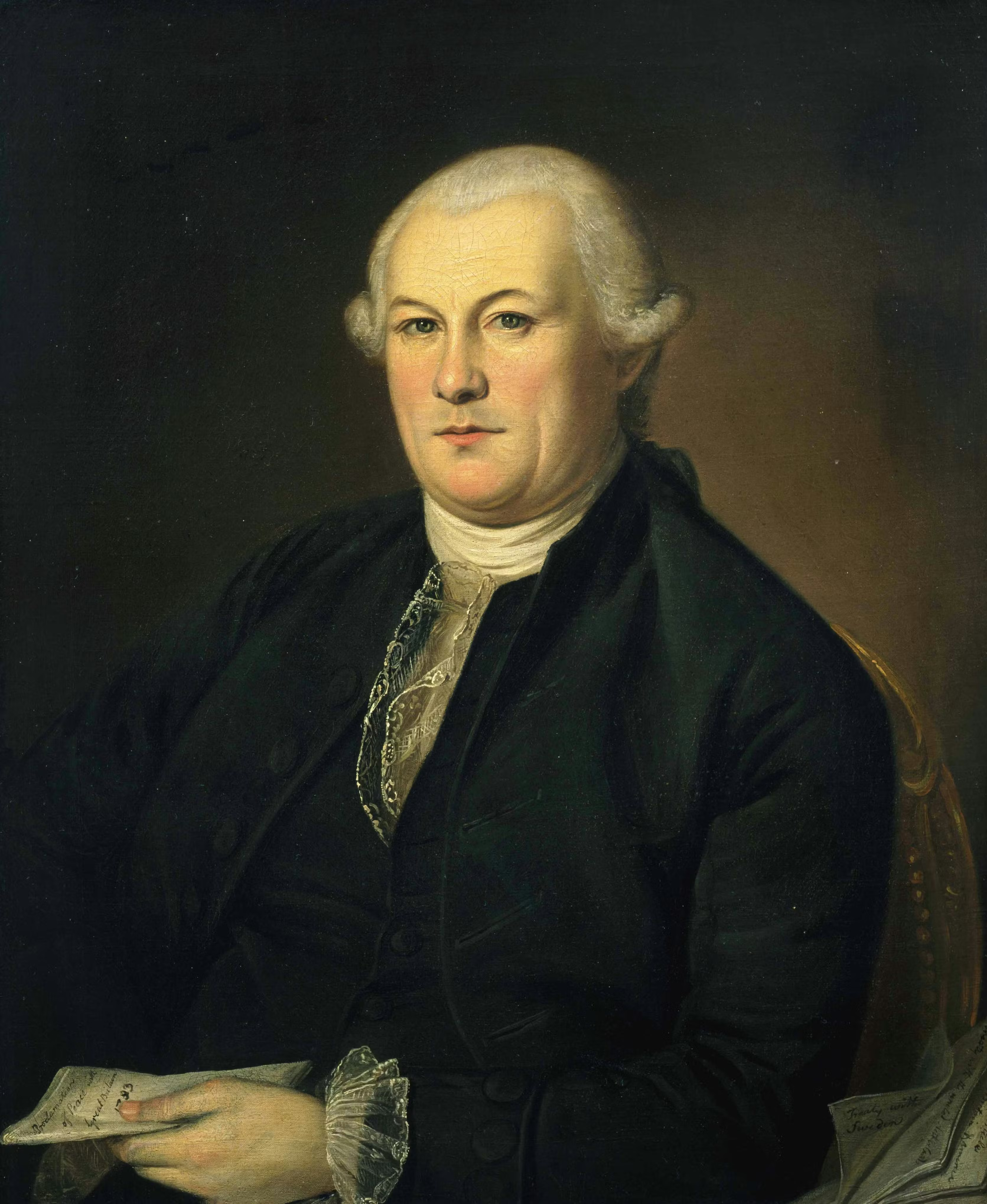
Elias Boudinot (1784)

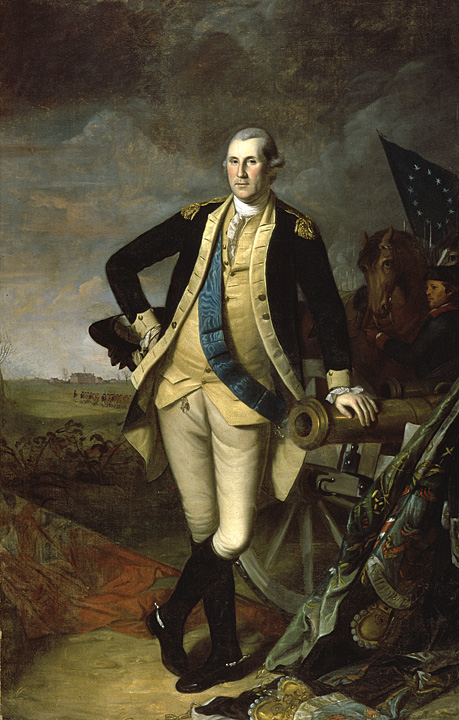
George Washington at the Battle of Princeton (1784)

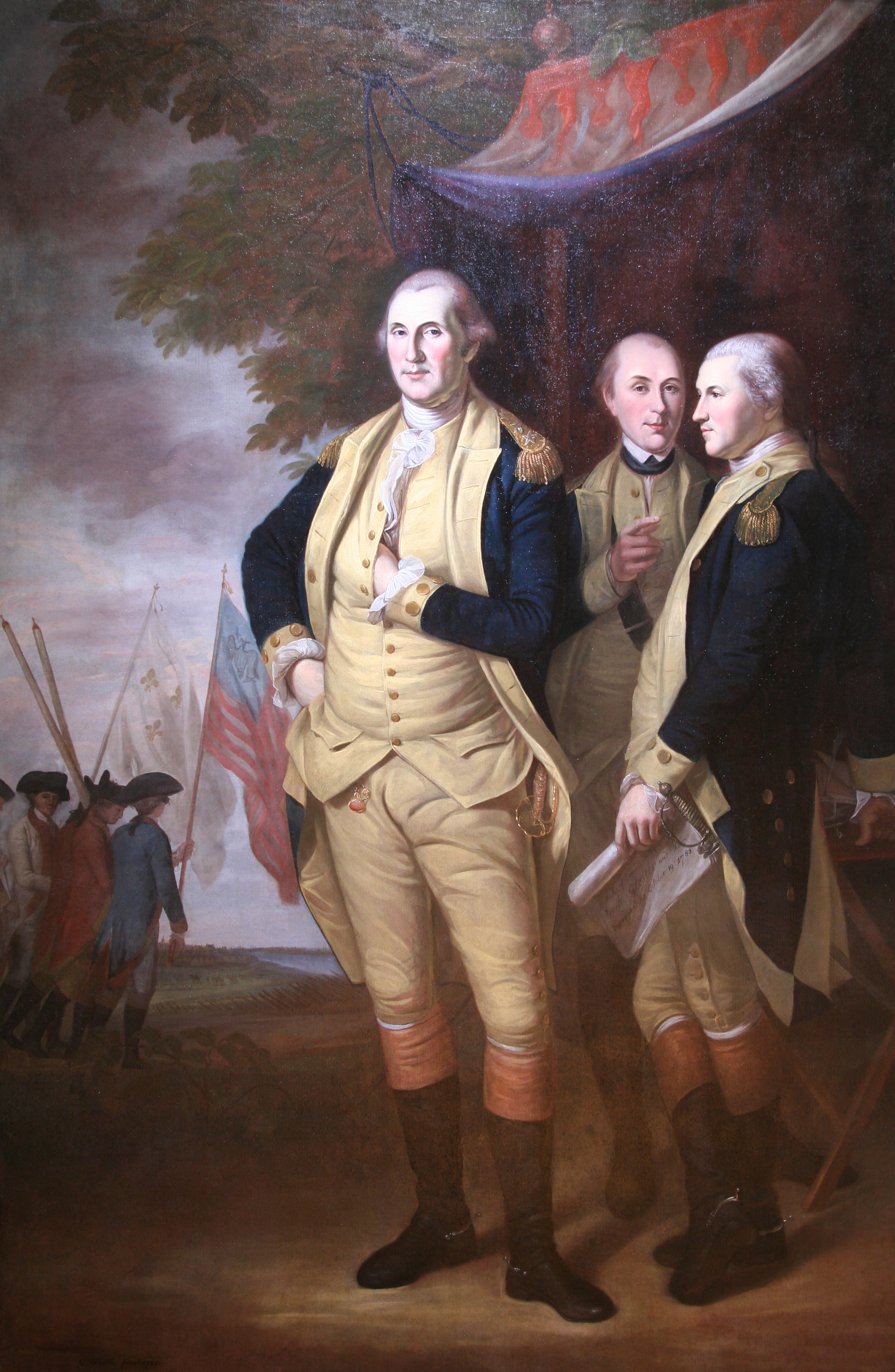
Washington, Lafayette & Tilghman at Yorktown (1784)

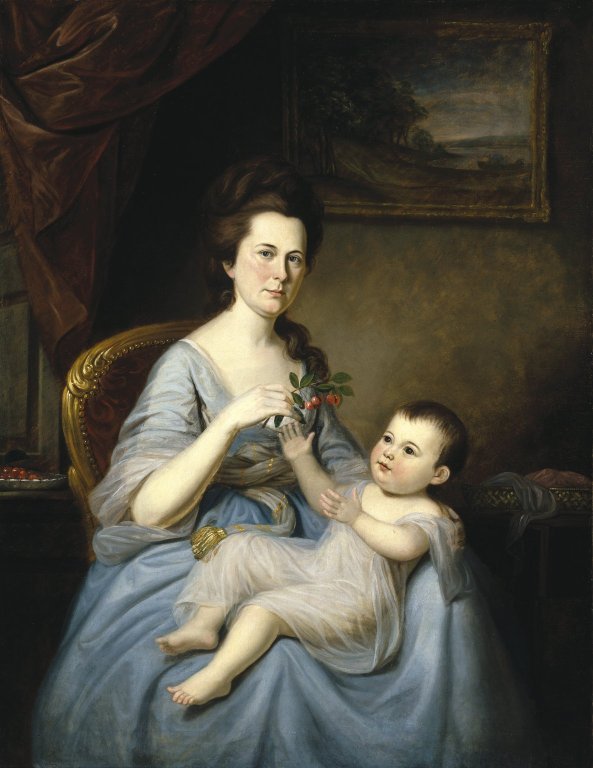
Mrs. David Forman and Child (c. 1785), Brooklyn Museum

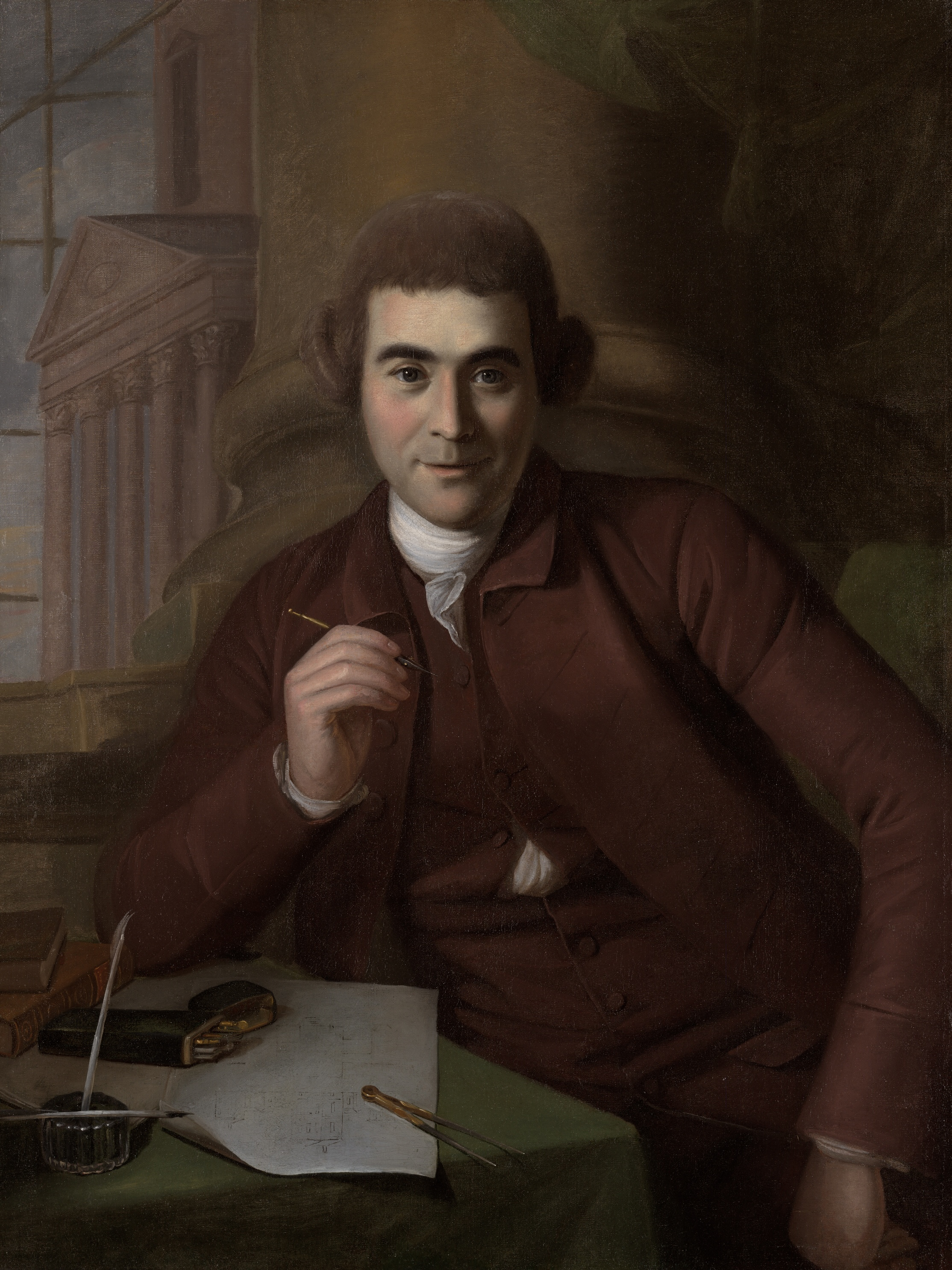
William Buckland (1789)

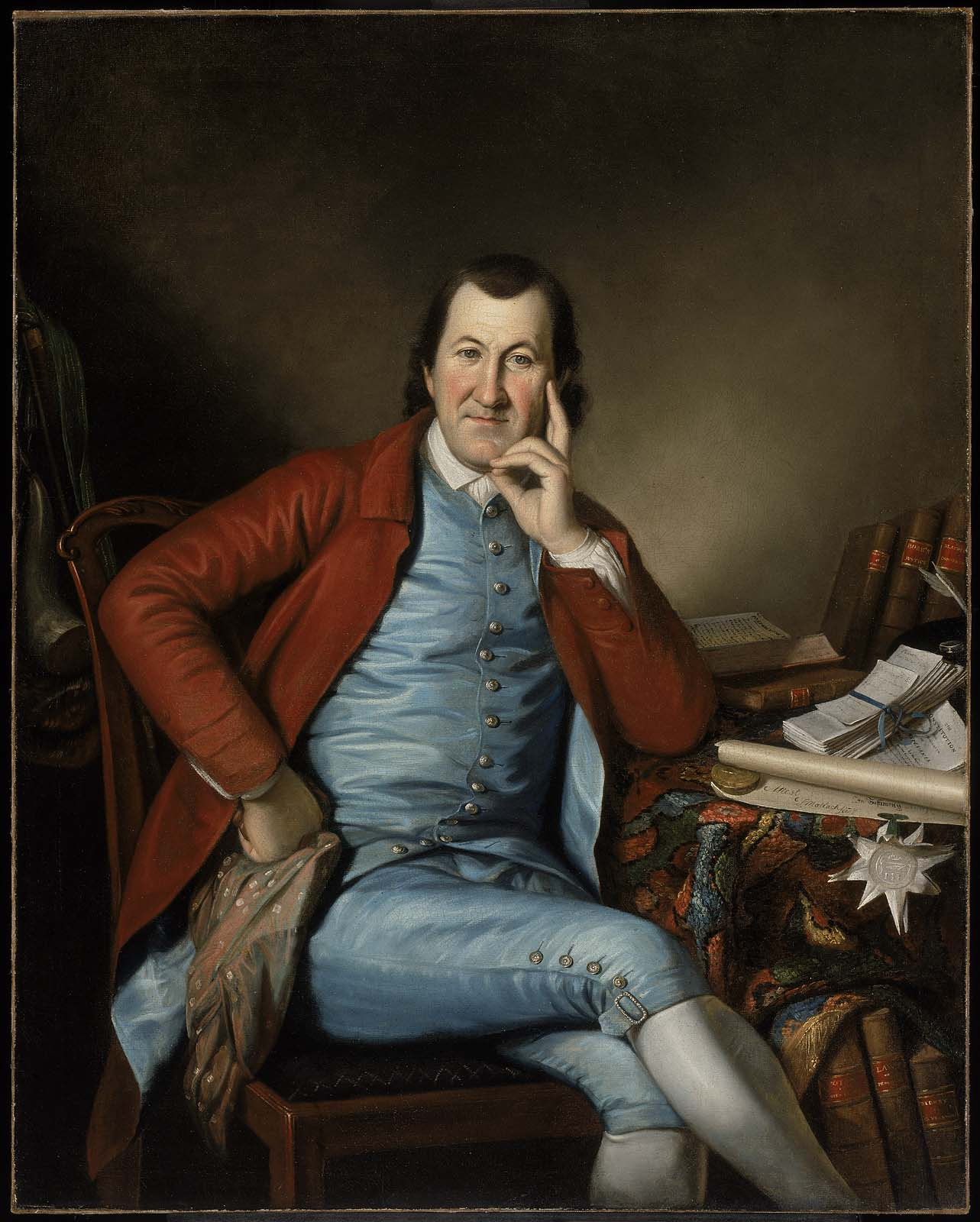
Timothy Matlack (c. 1790)

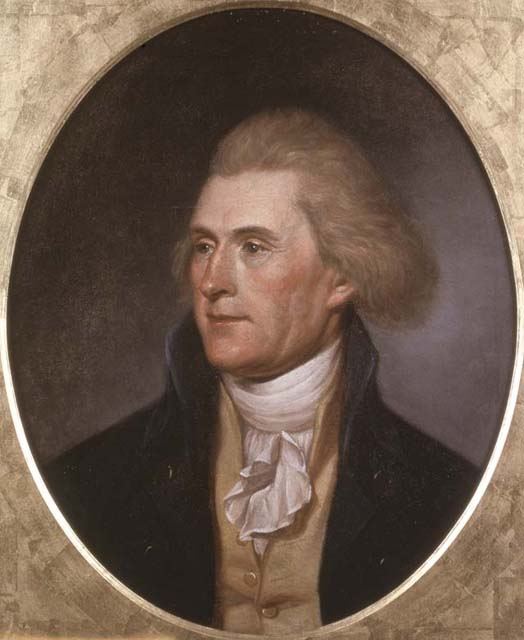
Thomas Jefferson (1791)

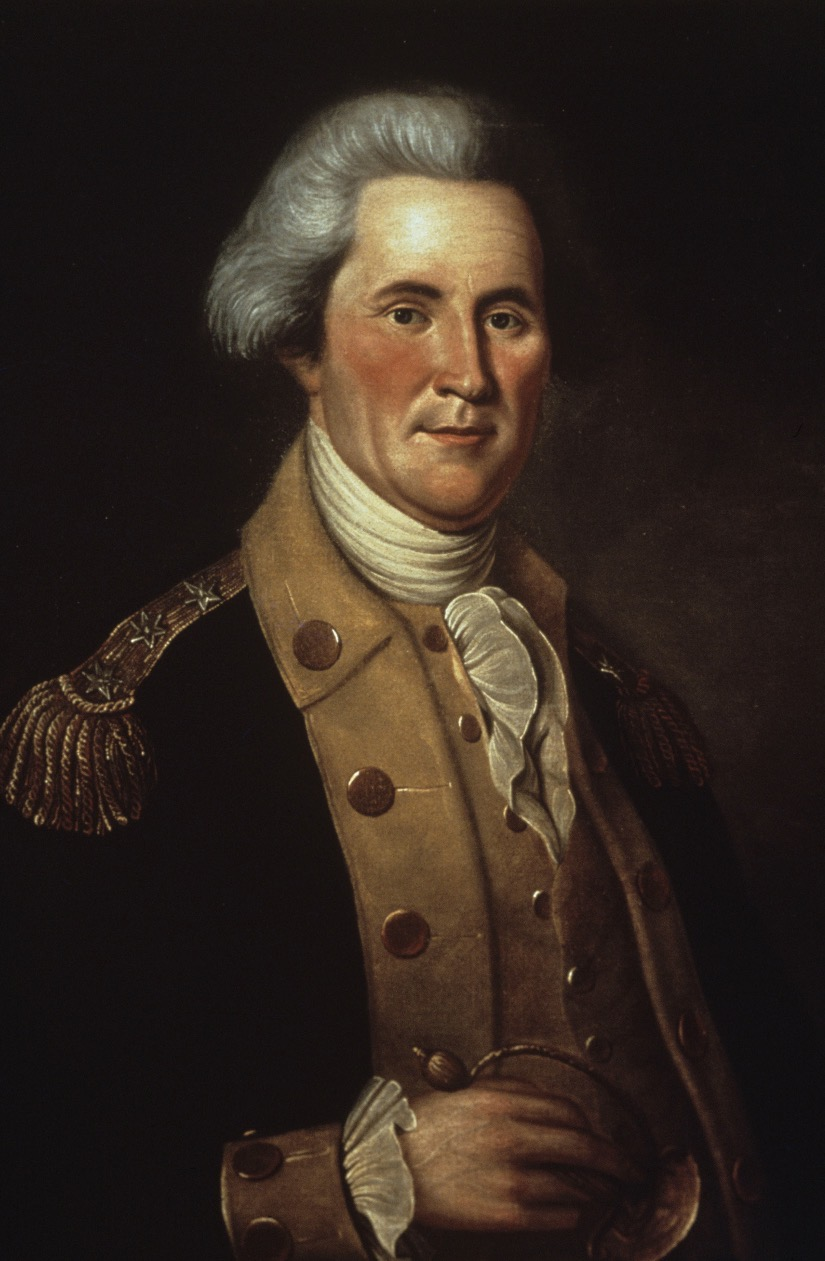
John Sevier (1792)

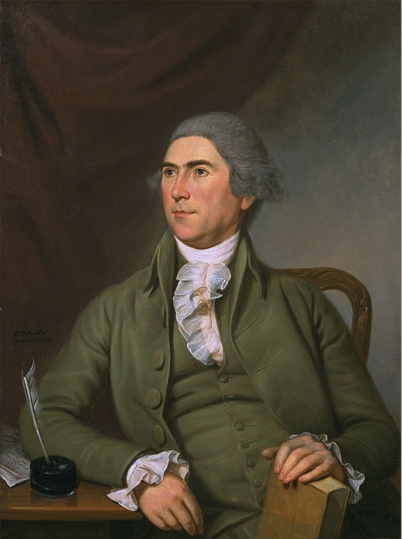
Charles Pettit (1792)

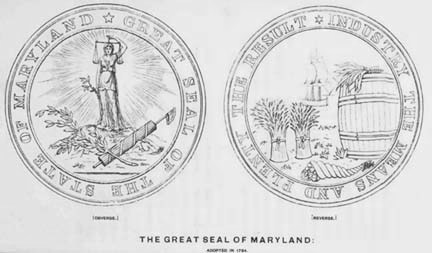
The obverse and reverse of the 1794 to 1817 state seal of Maryland, designed by Peale

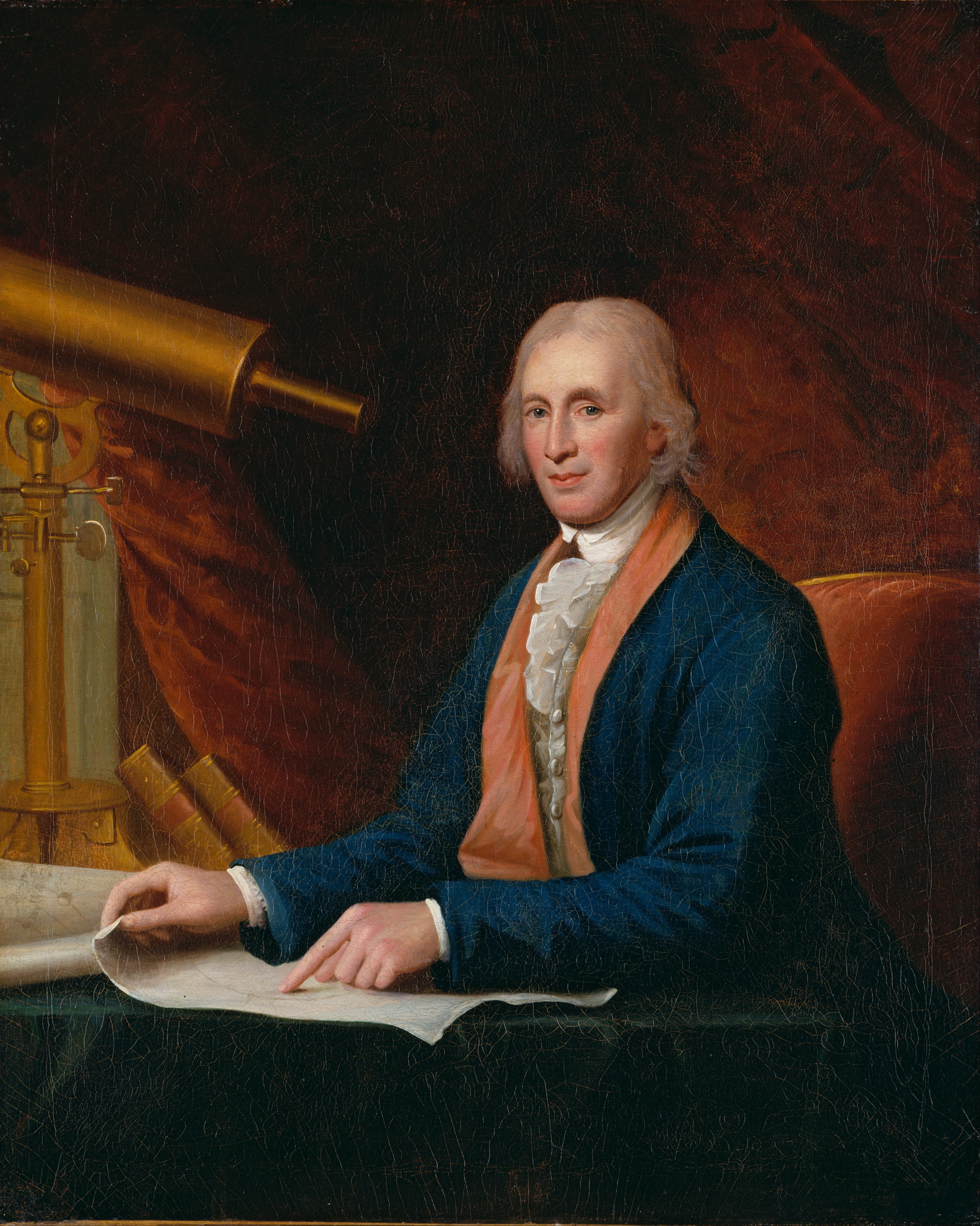
David Rittenhouse (1796)

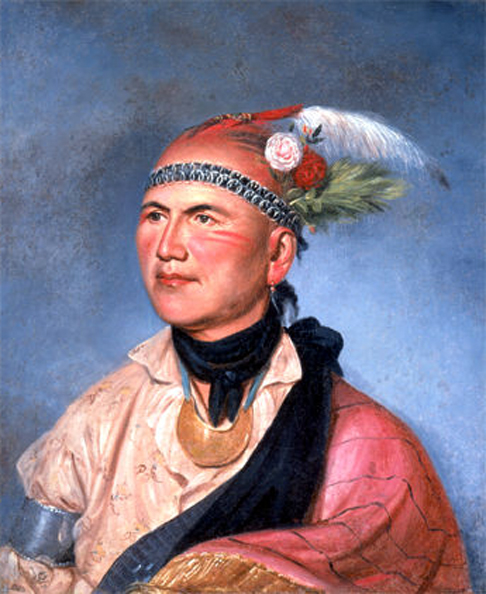
Joseph Brant (1797)

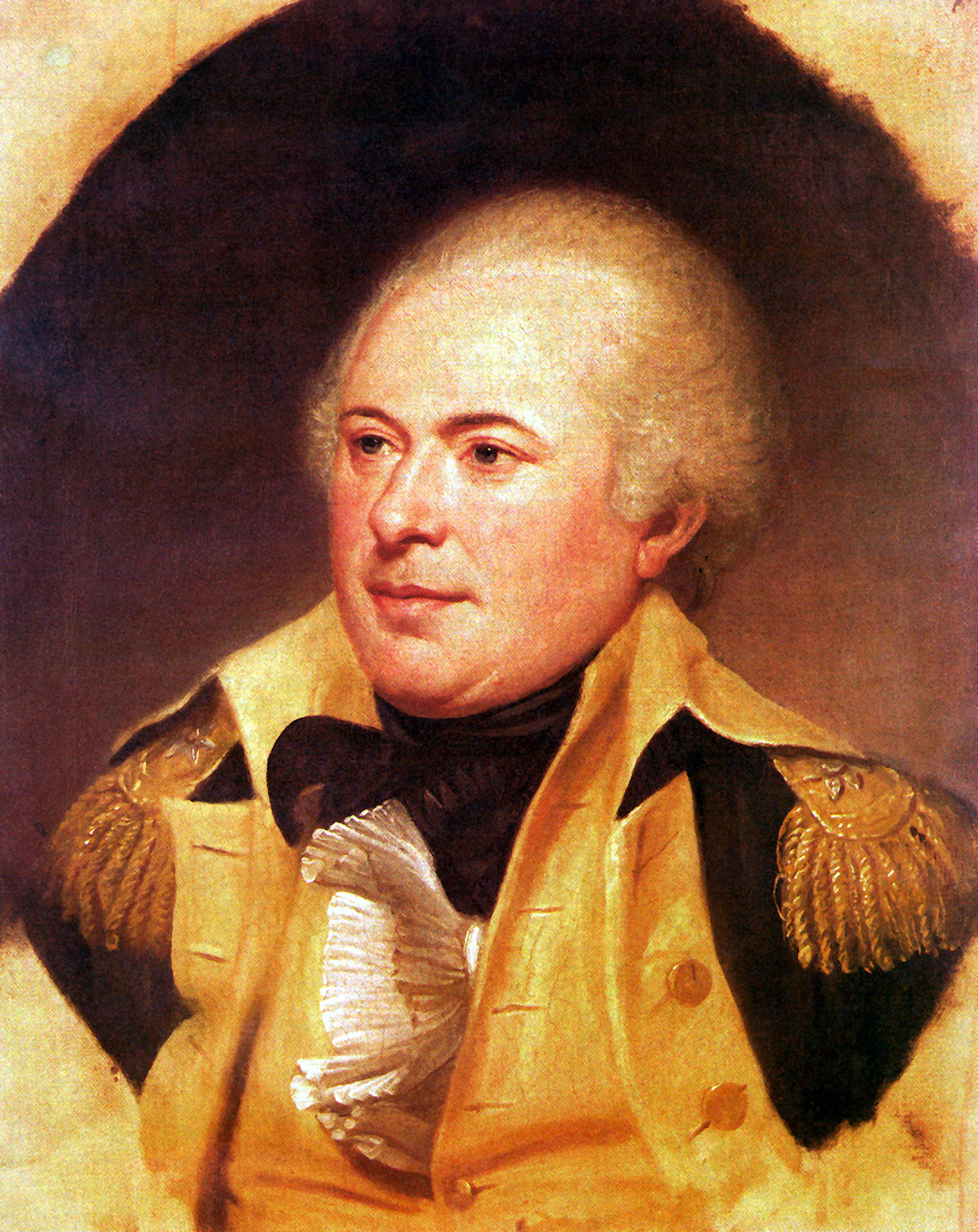
James Wilkinson (1797)

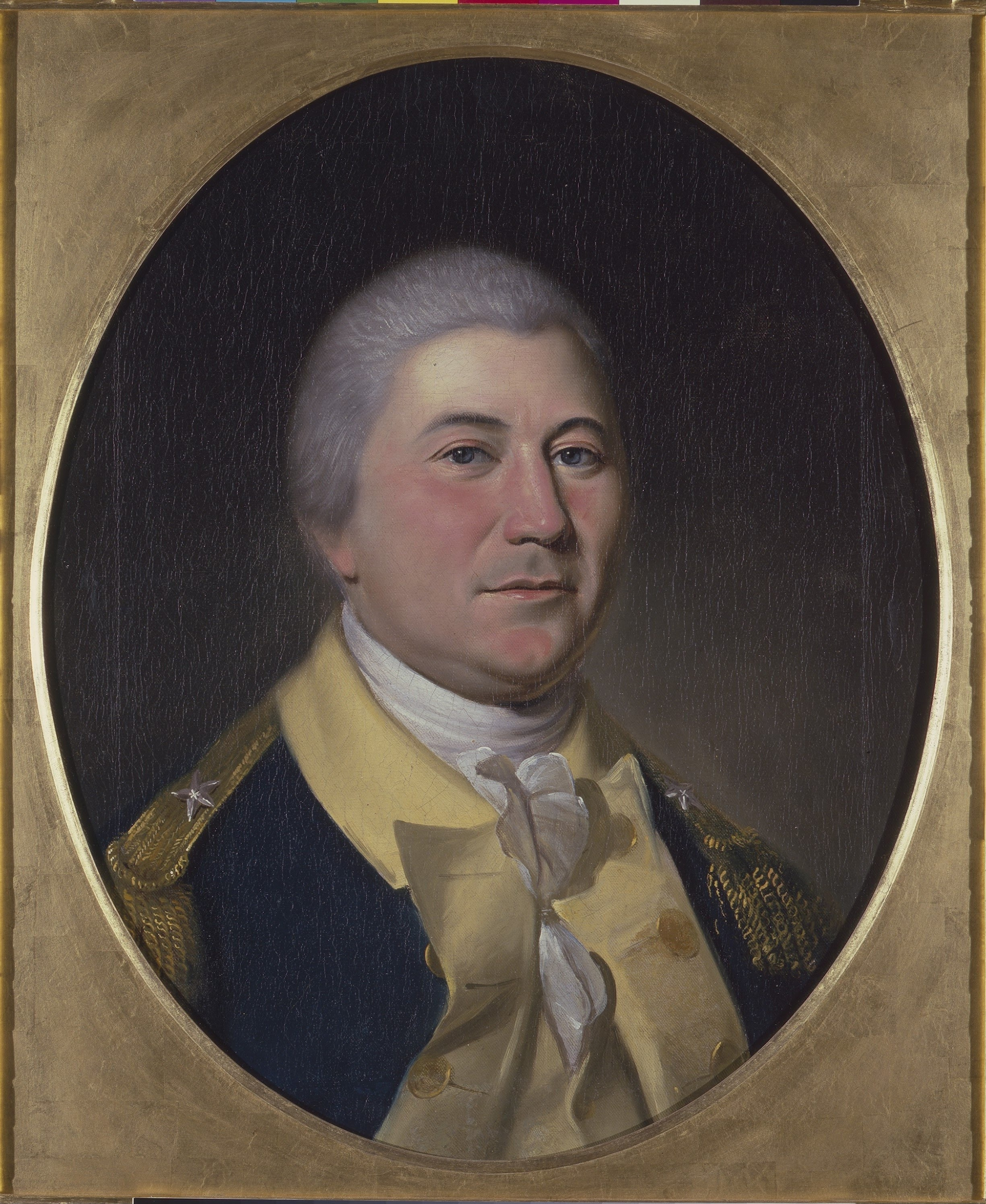
James Mitchell Varnum (1804)

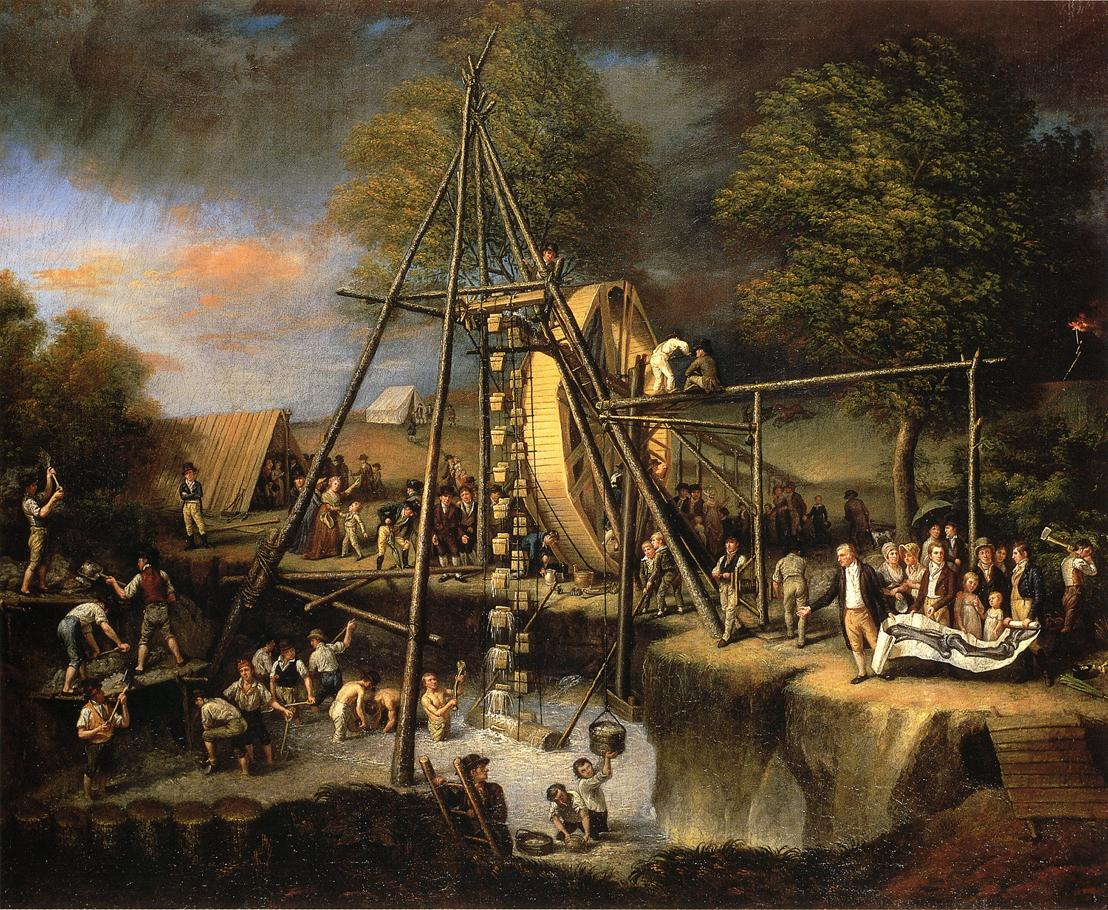
Exhuming the First American Mastodon (1806)

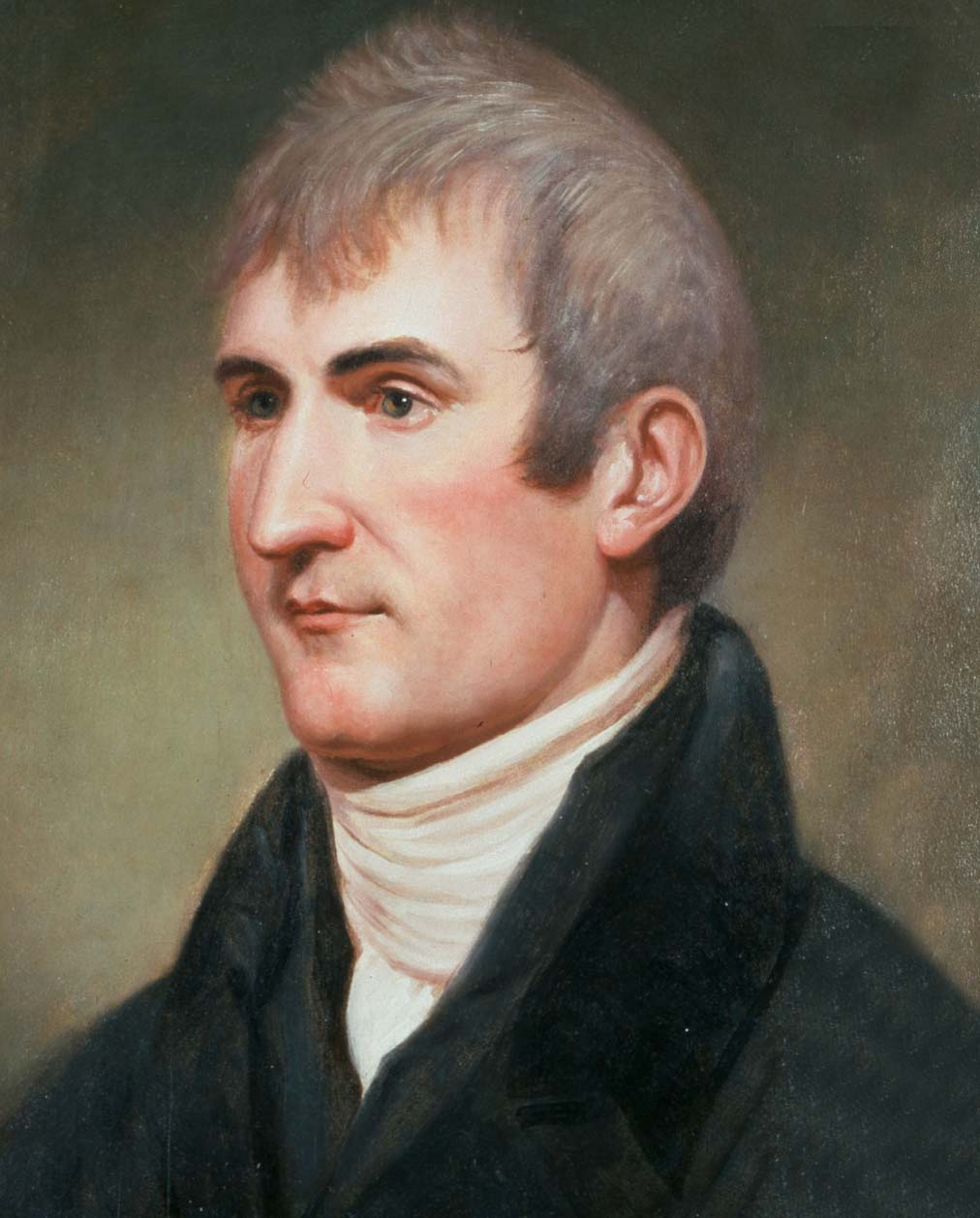
Meriwether Lewis (1807)

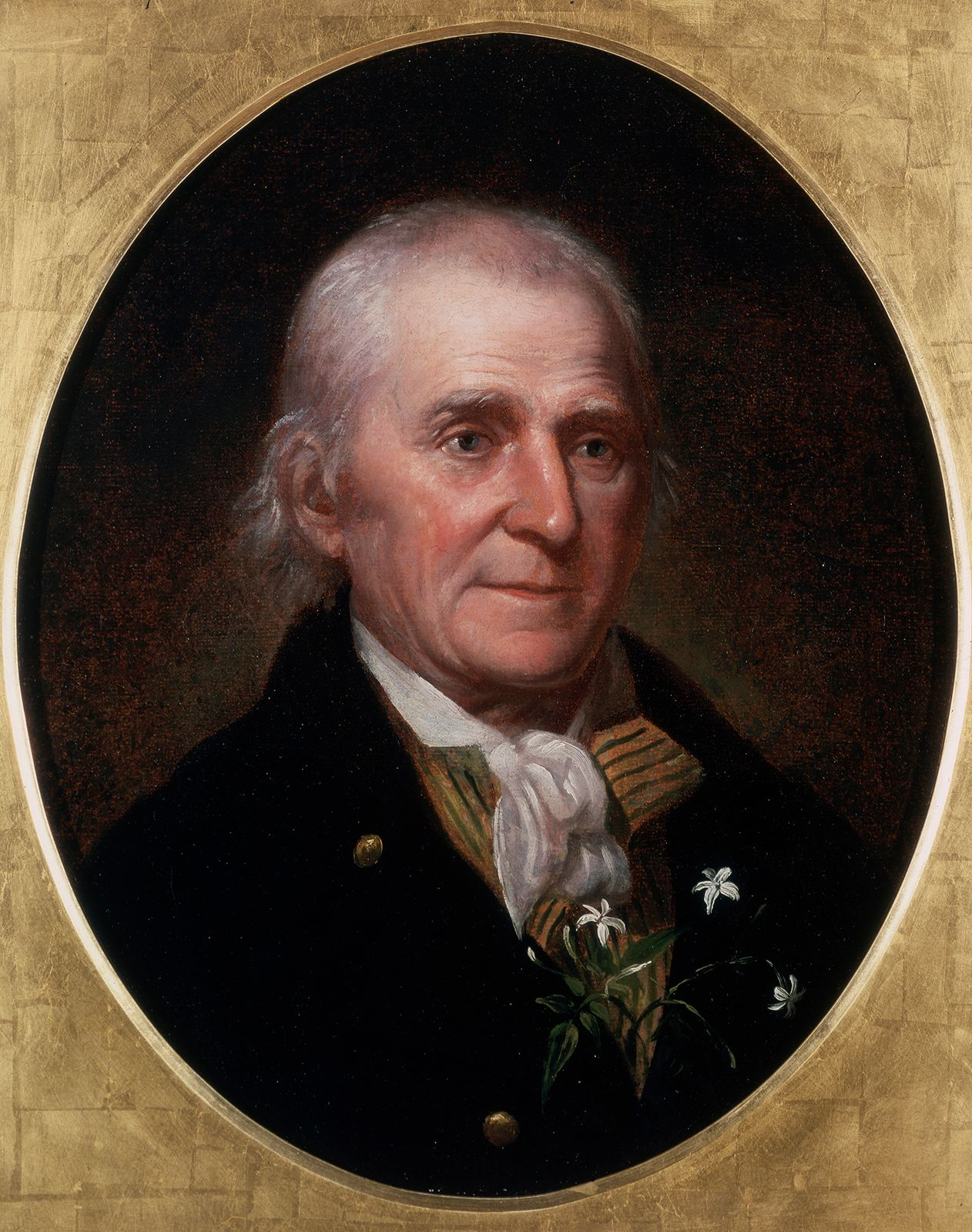
William Bartram (1808)

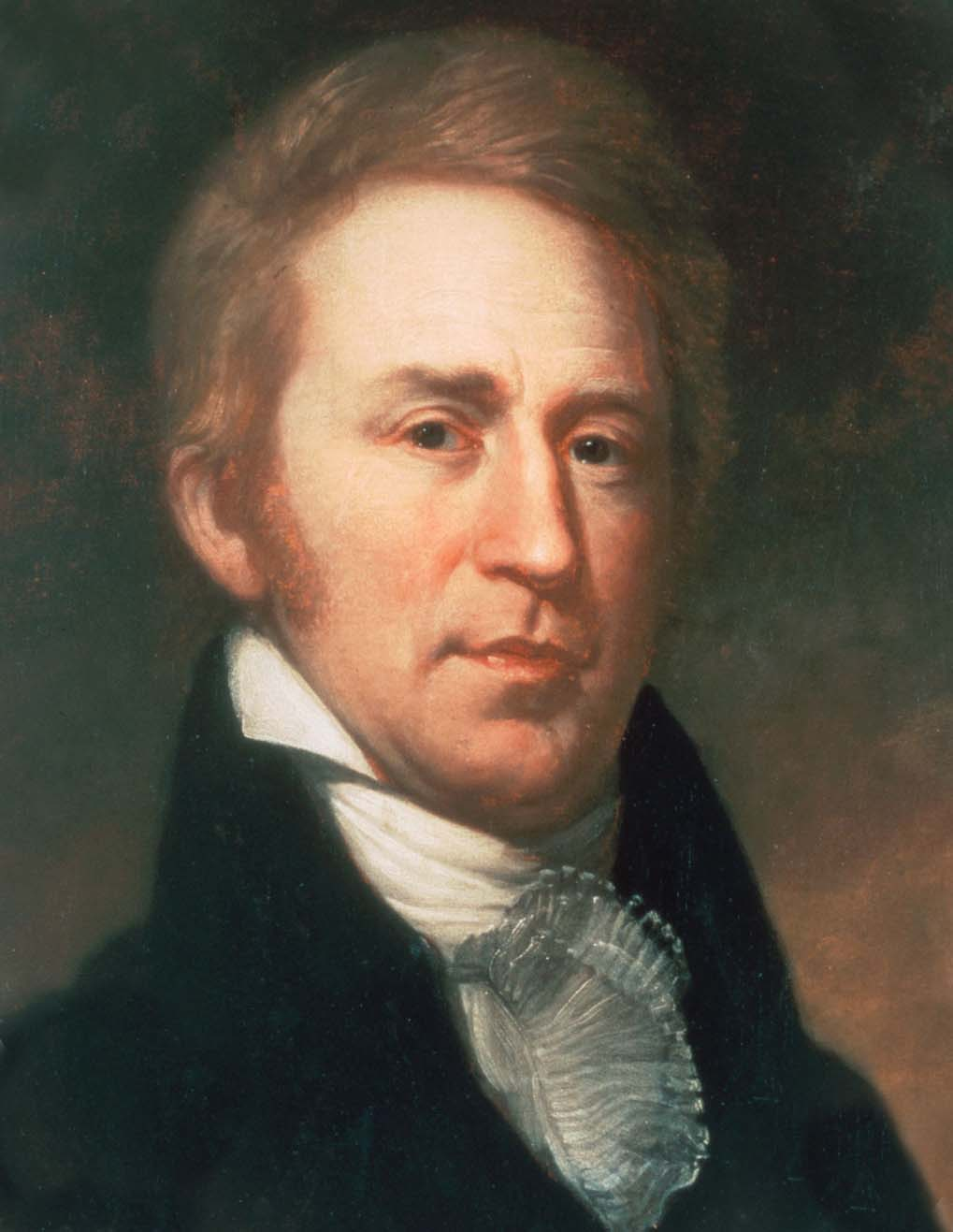
William Clark (1810)

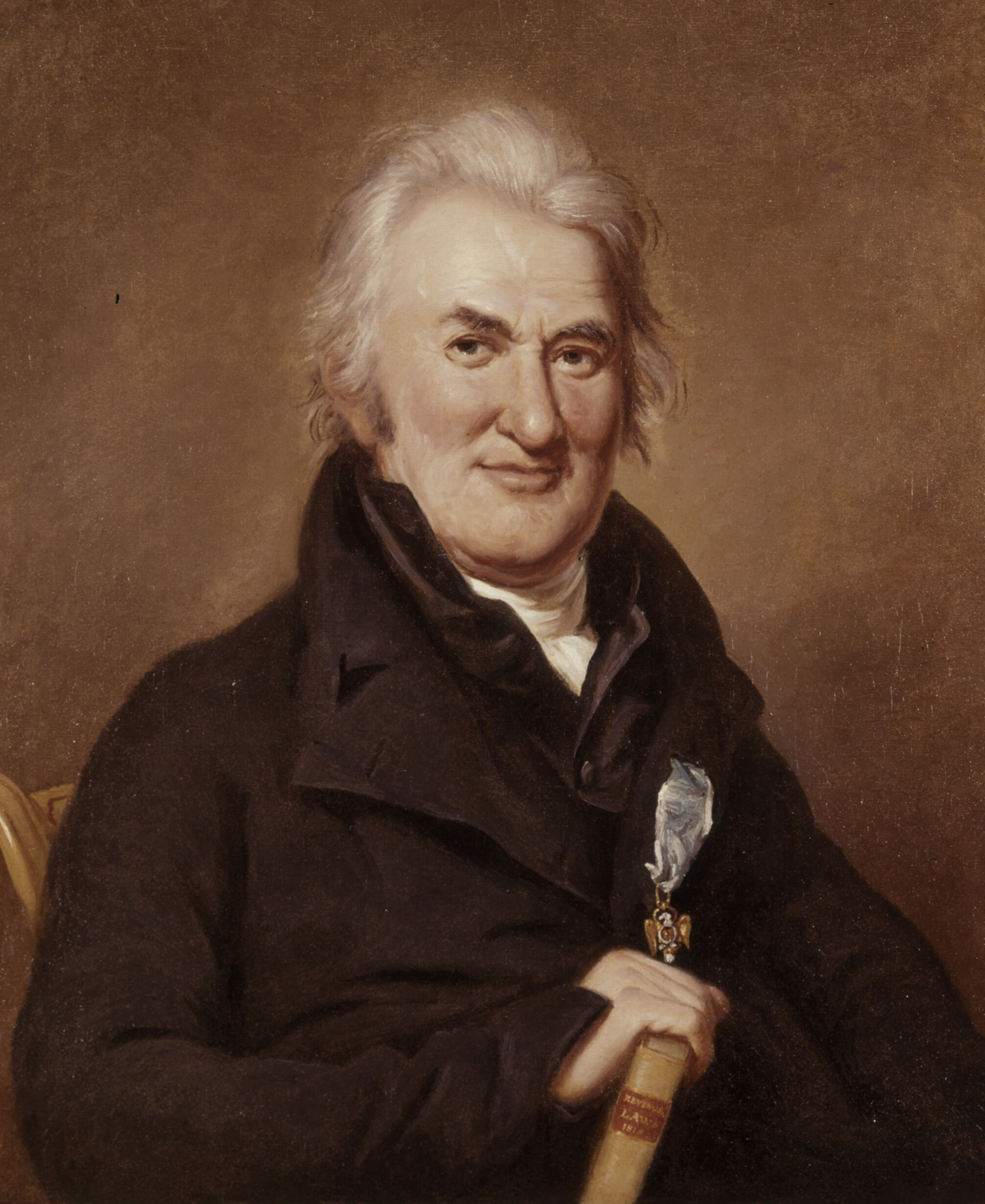
Allen McLane (1818)

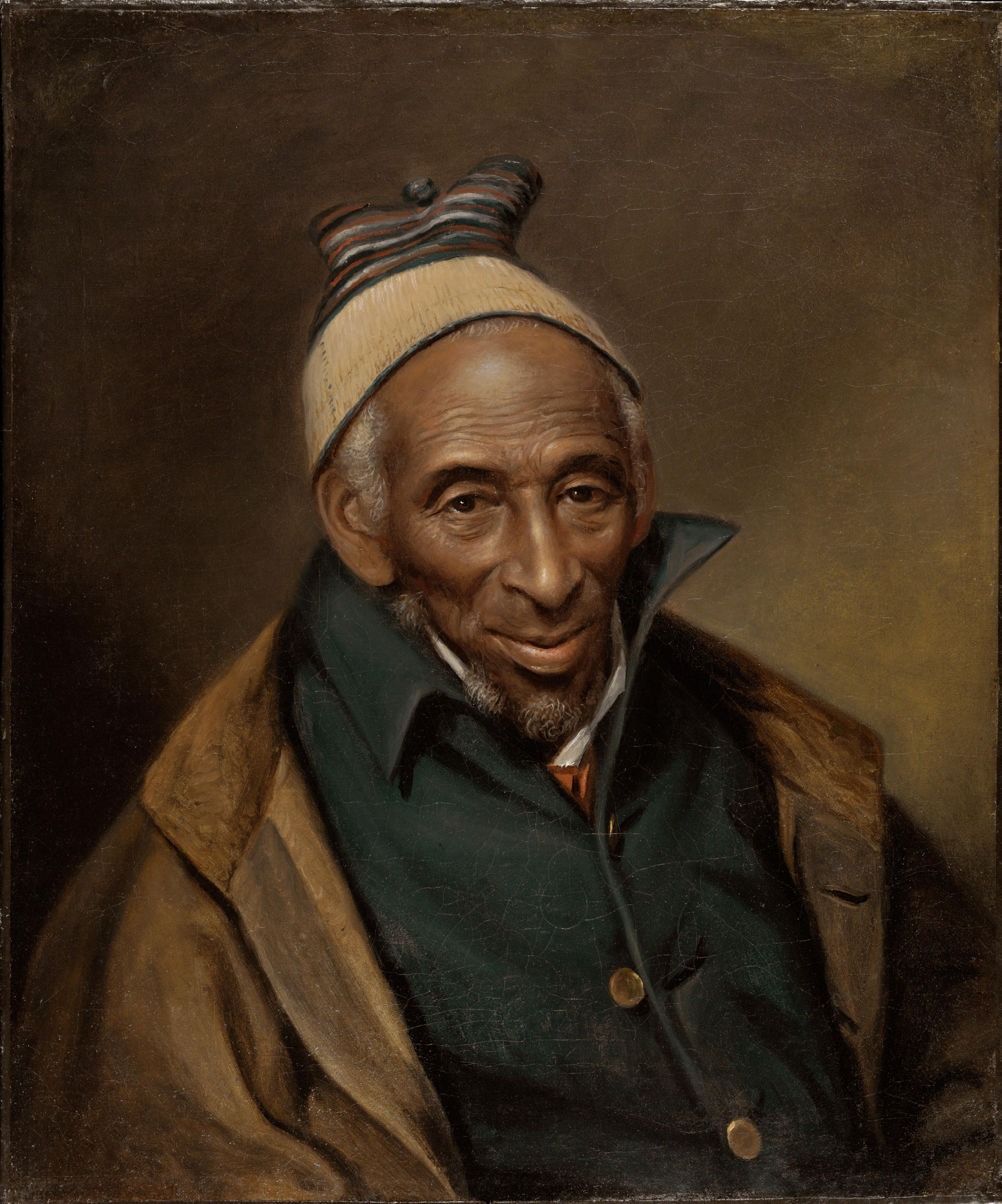
Yarrow Mamout (1819)

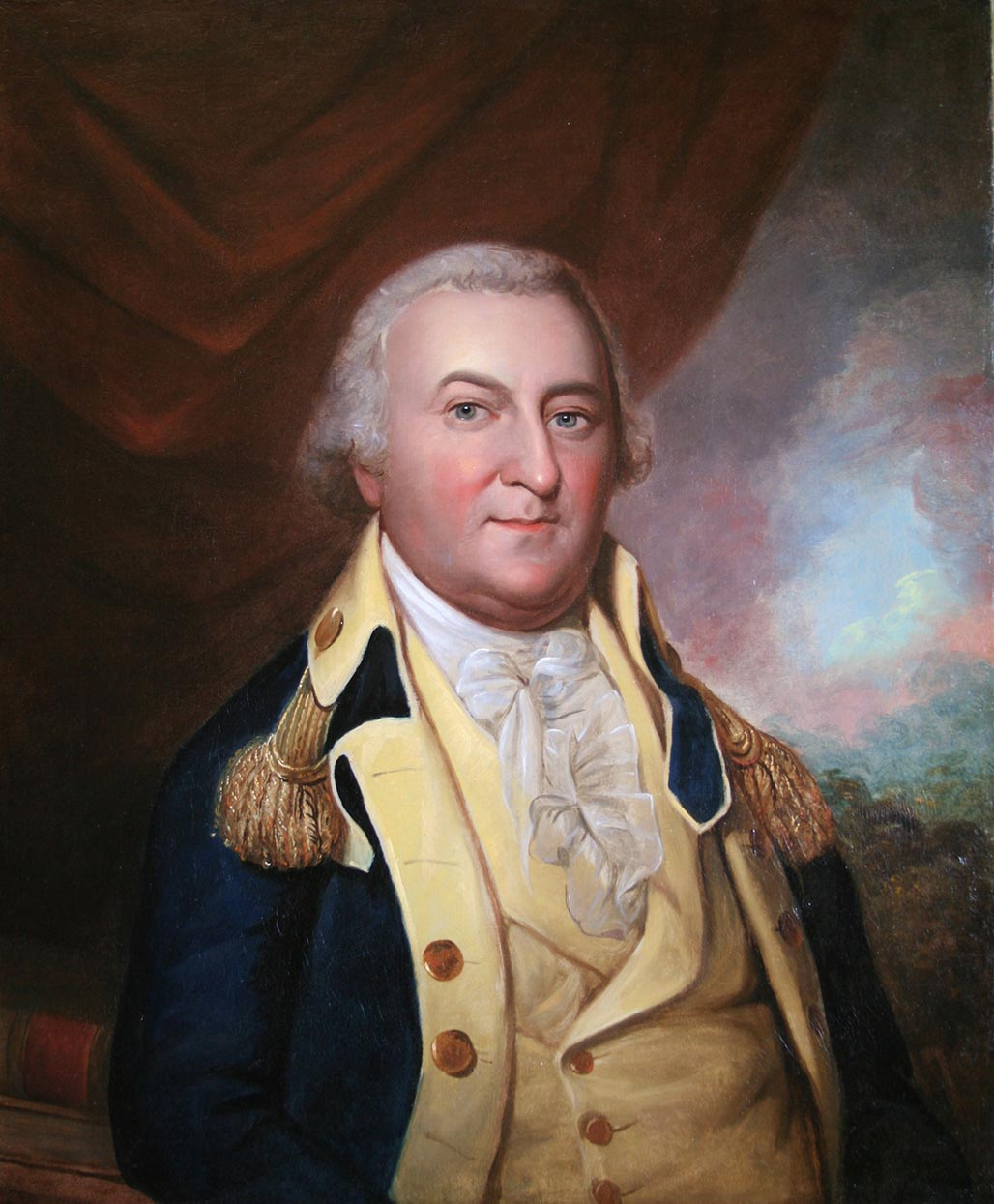
John Hoskins Stone (1824)

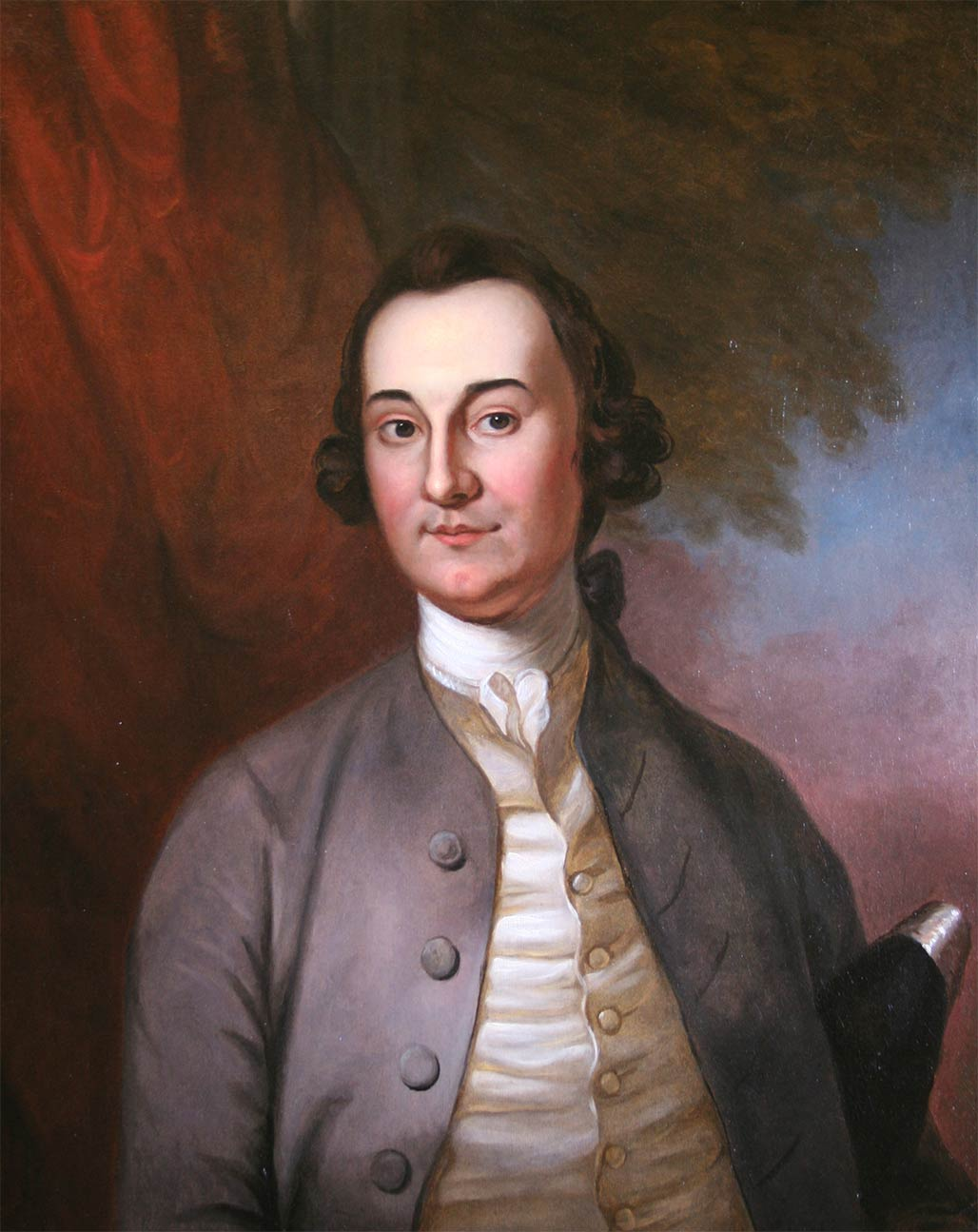
George Plater (1825)

== See also ==
- Peale's Barber Farm Mastodon Exhumation Site
- George Escol Sellers, grandson who was an inventor
- "The New Museum Idea"
