= Rubens Peale =

American museum administrator and painter

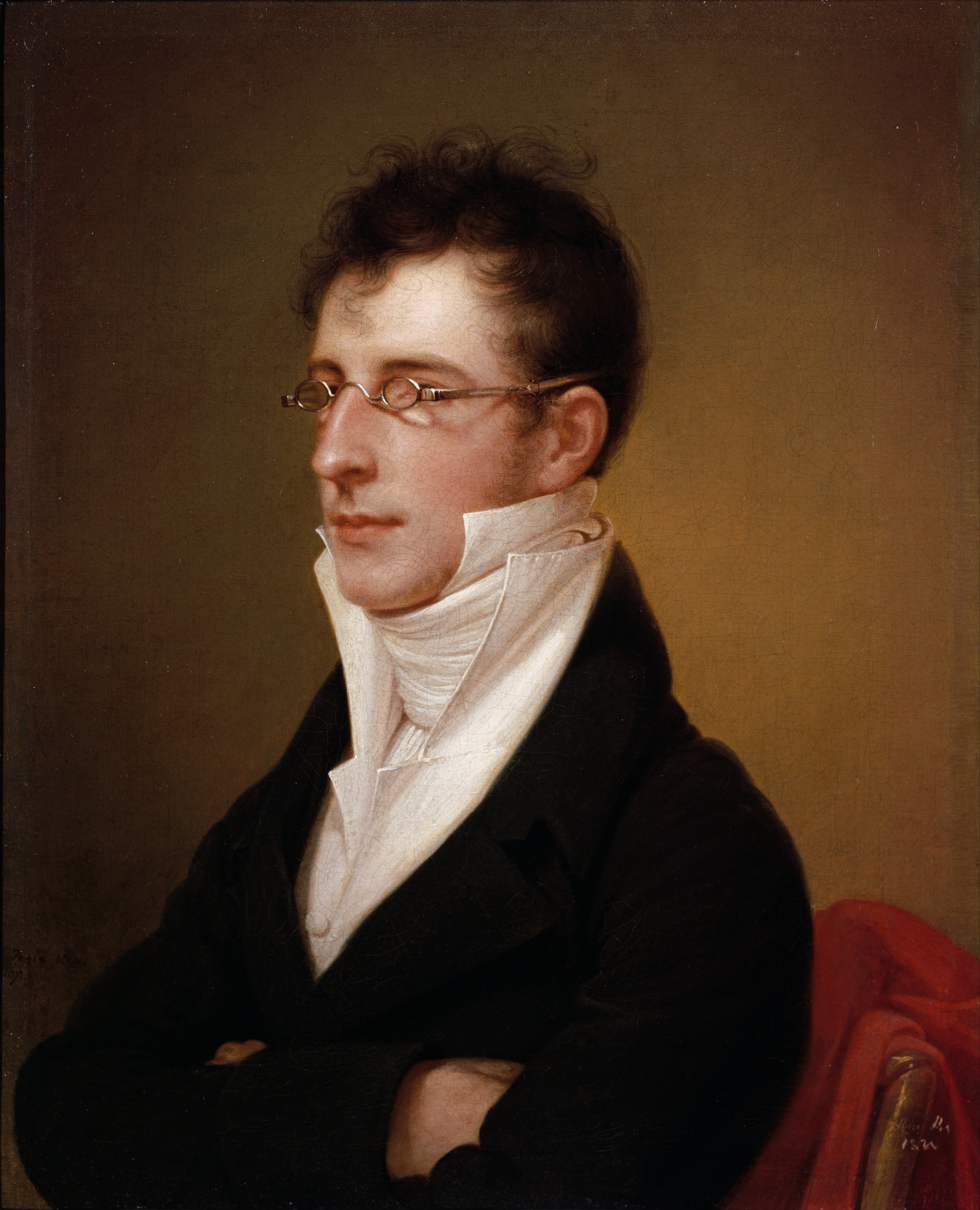
- Portrait of Rubens Peale, by Rembrandt Peale, 1807
- Born: May 4, 1784; Philadelphia, Pennsylvania, U.S.
- Died: July 17, 1865 (aged 81); Philadelphia, Pennsylvania, U.S.
- Education: University of Pennsylvania
- Spouse: Eliza Burd Patterson
- Parents: Charles Willson Peale; Rachel Brewer
- Relatives: Rembrandt Peale (brother); Raphaelle Peale (brother); Sophonisba Angusciola Peale (sister); Titian Ramsay Peale I (brother); Franklin Peale (half-brother); Titian Peale (half-brother)

Rubens Peale (May 4, 1784 – July 17, 1865) was an American museum administrator and artist. Born in Philadelphia, he was the son of artist-naturalist Charles Willson Peale. Due to his weak eyesight, he did not practice painting seriously until the last decade of his life, when he painted still life.

== Early life and education ==
He was the fourth son of Charles Willson Peale. Rubens had weak eyes and, unlike most of his siblings, did not set out to be an artist. He traveled with the family in 1802 to the United Kingdom, but was unable to travel on the continent with the resumption of war after the Peace of Amiens. In 1803 he attended classes at the University of Pennsylvania. He was director of his father's Philadelphia Museum from 1810 to 1821, and then of the Peale Museum in Baltimore, which he ran with his brother, Rembrandt Peale. To promote the museum, he installed gas lighting illumination in the museum. Rubens kept meticulous records of the museum's income and expenditures. Among his bookkeeping he wrote that in July 1826, they made $243 from evening crowds and from December 1826 to March 1827, they spent $16.50 for exhibiting a rhinoceros.

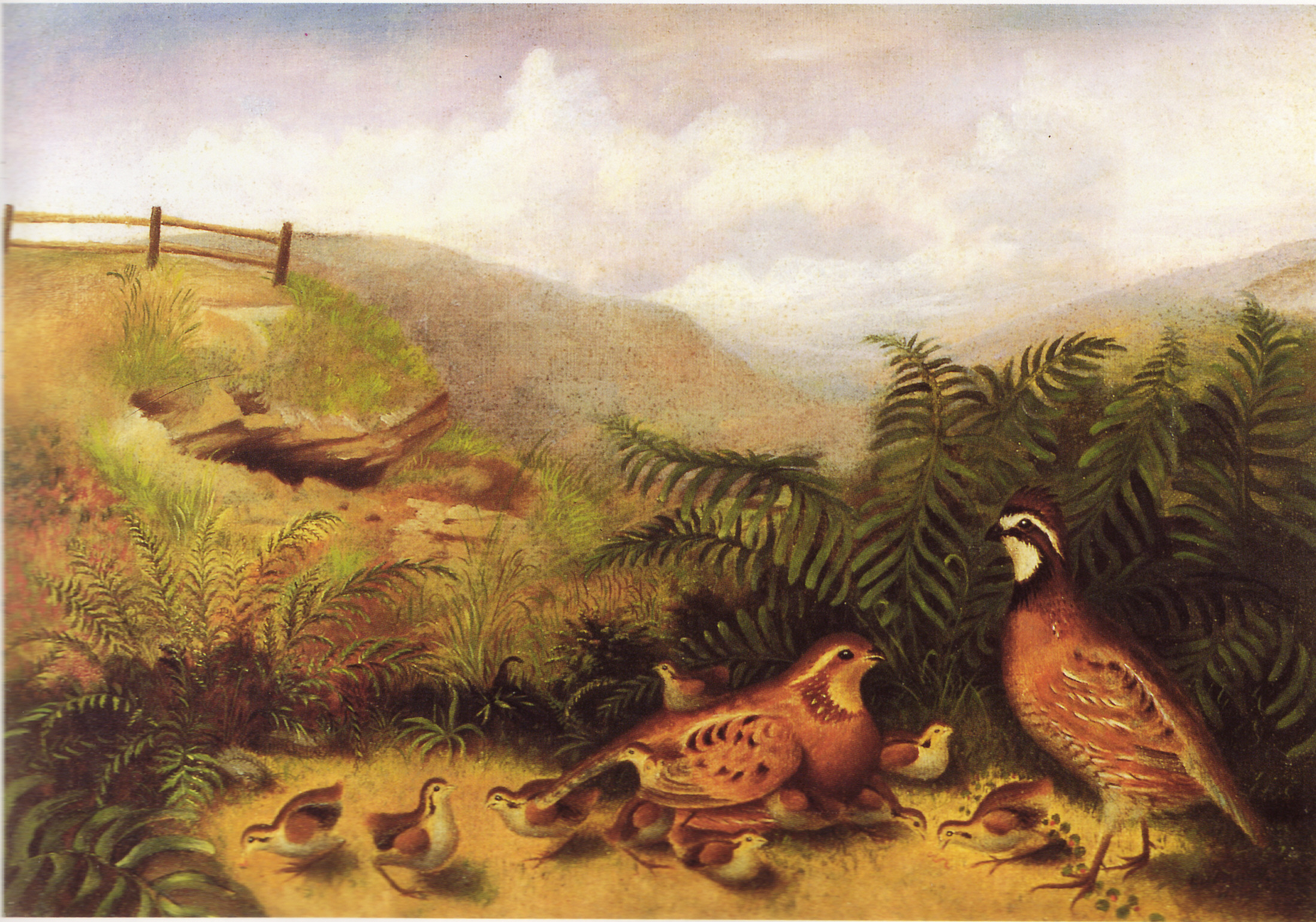
Landscape with Quail - Cock, Hen, and Chickens by Rubens Peale, date unknown

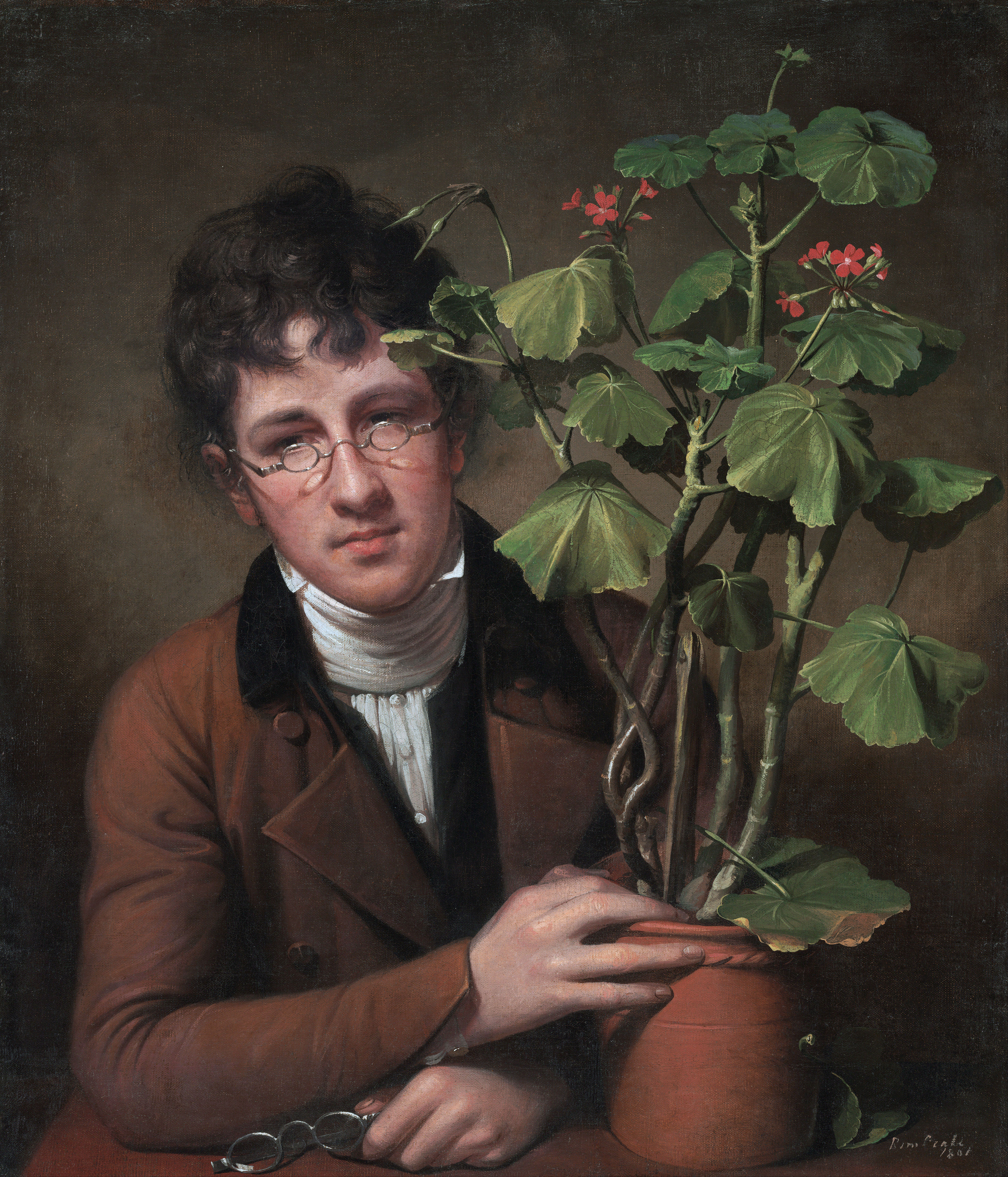
Rubens Peale with a Geranium (1801) by Rembrandt Peale.

== Career ==
=== Peale's Museum, New York ===
Peale opened his own museum in New York on October 26, 1825. The Panic of 1837 sent his museum into debt. By 1840, Peale changed the name to the New York Museum of Natural History and Science, and competed with the American Museum, of P.T. Barnum. Rubens had to sell his entire collection to Barnum in 1843. He moved to Pottstown, Pennsylvania. In 1837, he retired to the estate of his father-in-law, George Patterson, near Schuylkill Haven, Pennsylvania, and lived as a country gentleman, at Woodland Farm. He experimented with mesmerism, and wrote to his brother Rembrandt about it.

In October 1855, he began keeping a journal, and he turned to still life painting, as an extension of his interest in natural history. In 1864, he returned to Philadelphia, and studied landscape painting with Edward Moran. In the last ten years of his life, he produced 130 paintings.

=== Diary entries on the death of Abraham Lincoln ===
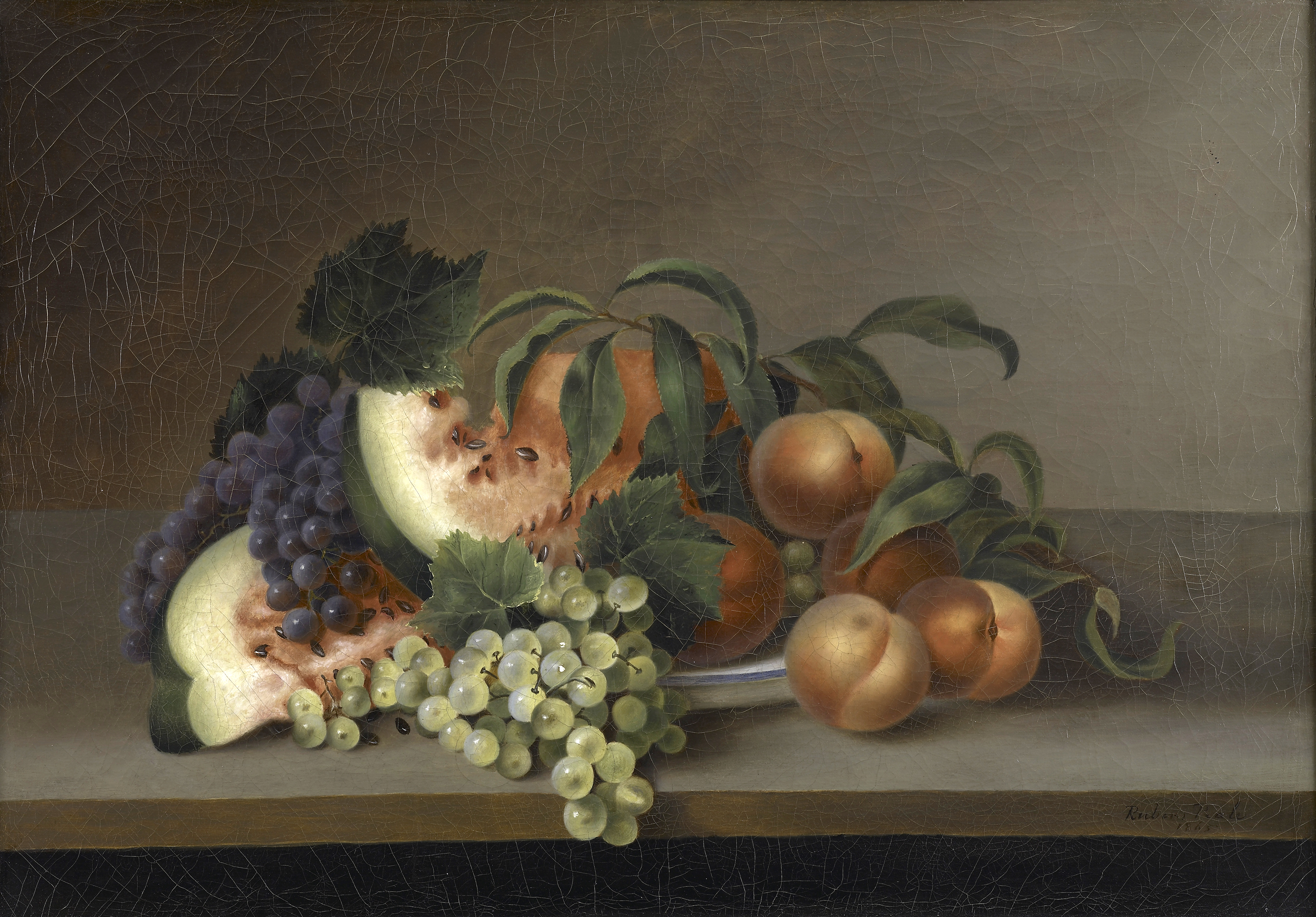
Still Life with Watermelon, 1865, Princeton University Art Museum

April 15, 1865:

sad news of the murder of President Lincon [sic], he was shot while attending a performance at Fords' Theater last night in Washington. The assassin entered his private box and shot him in back of his head and then escaped, the assassin's name is ______,

April the 22nd:

The corpse arrived this afternoon from Harrisburg and it was dark, and although the square was brilliantly illuminated with greek lights each side of the great walk Red, Blue & White, which made a most brilliant appearance and lighted up the wholes square & streets yet much of the procession near lost to us. The crowd was so dense in Walnut Street that police could scarcely keep the crowd back.

April the 23rd:

a fine opportunity of viewing the corpse and decorations of the hall, which was totally covered with black cloth except for the statue & portraits of General Washington & wife. I staid [sic] one hour and left Mary gazing on the corpse, she intending to paint a portrait of him ...

== Personal life ==
On March 6, 1820, he married Eliza Burd Patterson (December 6, 1795 – 1864) and they had children Charles Willson, George Patterson, William, Mary Jane (1826–1902) (who also was a painter), James Burd, and Edward Burd. Charles Willson Peale (Feb 15, 1821 – Sept 30, 1871) married Harriet Friel (b. Aug 11, 1830); their son Albert Charles Peale (1849-1914) became a geologist with the US Geological Survey.

== Legacy ==
In 1985, the National Gallery of Art paid $4.07 million for Rubens Peale with a Geranium, an 1801 portrait by his brother Rembrandt Peale. This set a record for an American work of art sold at auction.

In 2007, Princeton University Art Museum bought Rubens Peale's Still Life With Watermelon, in honor of John Wilmerding.
