= Sophonisba Angusciola Peale =

American painter and quiltmaker (1786–1859)

Sophonisba Angusciola (Peale) Sellers
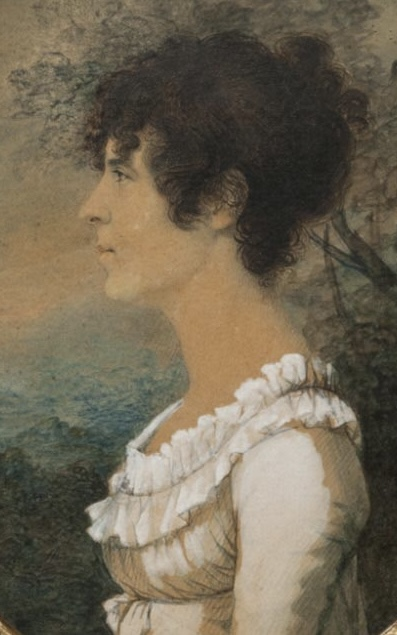
- 1805 portrait by Charles Willson Peale
- Born: April 24, 1786; Philadelphia, Pennsylvania, US
- Died: October 26, 1859 (aged 73); Upper Darby Township, Pennsylvania, US
- Known for: Quilting; Natural history Ornithology
- Spouse: Coleman Sellers (m. 1805; died 1834)
- Children: 6, including George and Coleman
- Parent: Charles Willson Peale (father)
- Relatives: Rembrandt Peale (brother); Raphaelle Peale (brother); Rubens Peale (brother); Titian Ramsay Peale I (brother); Franklin Peale (half-brother); Titian Peale (half-brother)

Sophonisba Angusciola (Peale) Sellers (April 24, 1786 – October 26, 1859), known by the nickname "Sopy," was an early American ornithologist and artist. She was also a noted quilt-maker and a surviving example of her work is preserved in the Philadelphia Museum of Art. She is recognized as the first woman in America to collect and prepare bird specimens for scientific study.

== Early life ==
Sellers was born in Philadelphia, Pennsylvania on April 24, 1786. She was the daughter of the polymath Charles Willson Peale (1741–1827) and his wife, Rachel Brewer Peale (1744–1790). She was named after the Italian Renaissance painter Sophonisba Angusciola (1532–1625). She grew up surrounded by the natural history collection of her father's Philadelphia Museum, which included hundreds of mounted bird specimens. The collection was moved into Philosophical Hall in 1794, when Sellers was 8 years old, and again to the Pennsylvania State House (now Independence Hall) in 1802, when she was 16.

== Ornithology ==
During the spring of 1803, Sellers trained with her father and learned to collect and prepare bird specimens with arsenic. On May 31, 1803, these activities were described in a letter from C. W. Peale to Sophonisba's brothers, Rembrandt Peale and Rubens Peale:

I am now amidst my hurry of preserving birds—Sophonisba not only preserving them well but she also accompanies me in my hunting excursions and is now fond of Shooting with the little Fuzee [shotgun].

Rubens responded to his father on July 20, 1803:

It gives me pleasure to learn that Sophonisba has become a collector, I hope she may prosper in it, for I hope to pertake [sic] of the same pleasure when I return to Dear Philadelphia. I should like to see foreign countries and collect in them, but in my situation do but little.

During the yellow fever epidemic that plagued Philadelphia during the late summer and fall of 1803, Sellers and her father remained in the city and worked on renovations to the museum. Yellow fever had been an ongoing problem in Philadelphia since 1793. During the 1803 outbreak, Sellers worked for several months, copying Latin binomials (following the Linnaean system), English, and French common names from a handwritten "Book Catalogue", which had been prepared in 1795–1797 by Palisot de Beauvois, onto wooden frames, which were then attached to the glass cases containing the mounted birds. On August 7, 1803, Charles wrote to his sons again:

The Museum will now in a short time have the Catalogue in frames over each Box — Sophonisba has advanced so far, that I have now Taken out of the Room the Book Catalogue.

Shortly after Sellers completed her "Catalogue in frames," Charles printed a summary of the bird collection in a pamphlet entitled A Guide to the Philadelphia Museum (1804):

There are now in this collection, perhaps all the birds belonging to the Middle, many of which likewise belong to the Northern and Southern States, and a considerable number from South America, Europe, Africa, Asia, New Holland, and the recently discovered islands of the South Seas. The number exceeds 760 [specimens] without the admission of any duplicates, contained in 140 cases.

== Personal life ==
Sophonisba Angusciola Peale married Coleman Sellers (1781–1834), an engineer and inventor, in 1805. They had two daughters and four sons, including George Escol Sellers (1808–1899) and Coleman Sellers II (1827–1907).

== Death ==
Sophonisba Angusciola (Peale) Sellers died in Upper Darby Township, Pennsylvania, on October 26, 1859, at the age of 73. She was buried in a family plot in New Jerusalem Burial Ground in Upper Darby, and her remains were later moved to West Laurel Hill Cemetery, Bala Cynwyd, Montgomery County, Pennsylvania, US.
