= Coleman Sellers II =

American engineer and inventor (1827–1907)

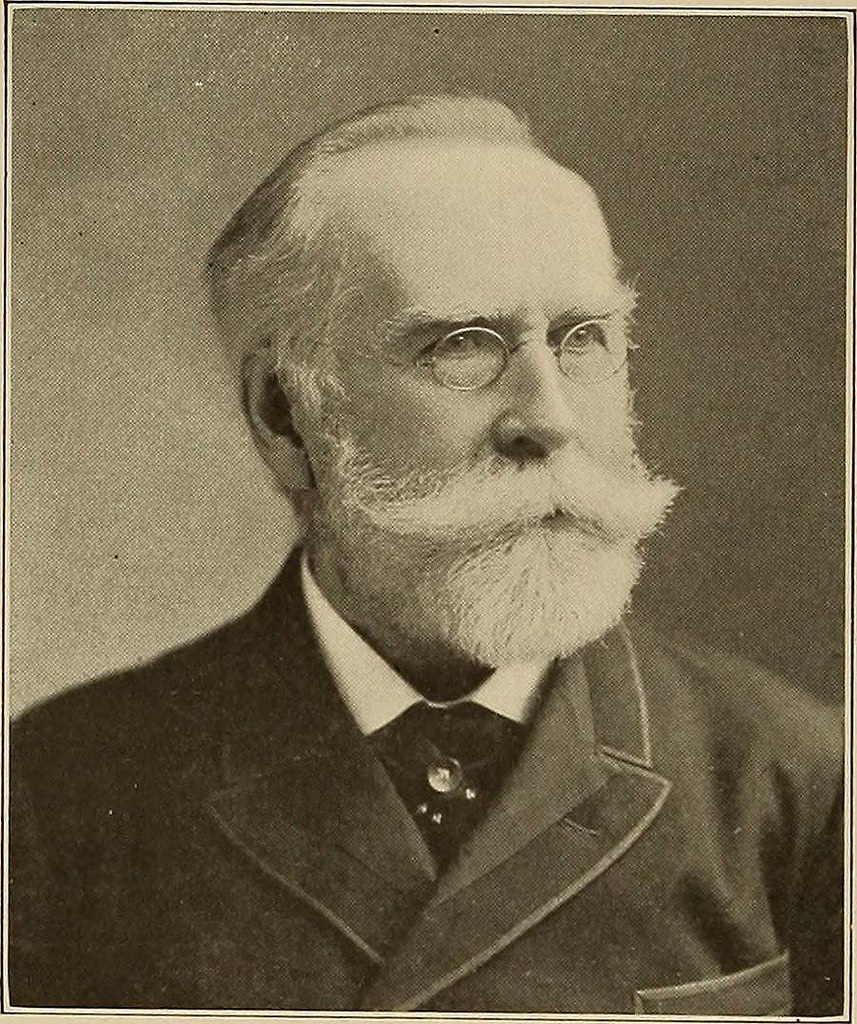
- Sellers in a 1905 publication
- Born: January 28, 1827; Upper Darby Township, Pennsylvania, U.S.
- Died: December 28, 1907 (aged 80); Philadelphia, Pennsylvania, U.S.
- Resting place: West Laurel Hill Cemetery; Bala Cynwyd, Pennsylvania, U.S.
- Occupations: Engineer; educator; inventor
- Spouse: Cornelia Wells (m. 1851)
- Children: 4
- Mother: Sophonisba (Peale) Sellers
- Relatives: Charles Willson Peale (grandfather)

Coleman Sellers II (January 28, 1827 – December 28, 1907) was a prominent American engineer, chief engineer of William Sellers & Co., professor of mechanics at the Franklin Institute, professor of engineering practice at Stevens Institute of Technology and inventor. He obtained more than thirty letters-patent for inventions of his own, and served as president of the American Society of Mechanical Engineers from 1886 to 1887.

== Biography ==
=== Early life ===
Sellers was born in Upper Darby Township, Pennsylvania, as the youngest son of Coleman and Sophonisba (Peale) Sellers and a direct descendant of Samuel Sellers, who in 1682 received one of the first grants of land in Pennsylvania. His father and a number of paternal ancestors had been engineers; his maternal grandfather was Charles Willson Peale. He was educated at common schools and studied for five years with Anthony Bolmar at his academy in West Chester, Pennsylvania.

=== Early career ===
In 1846, Sellers became draughtsman in the Globe Rolling Mill in Cincinnati, Ohio, which was operated by his two older brothers, Charles and George Escol Sellers. Here his mechanical ingenuity quickly asserted itself and under his direction the wire mill belonging to the plant was rebuilt and improved. He remained there for three years, serving part of the time as superintendent. Because of his prompt and thorough investigation of scientific discoveries, he became the mentor of a group of intellectual men in Cincinnati and frequently gave lectures, illustrated by practical experiments, on chemistry, physics, and electricity. In 1850-1851, he undertook the design and construction of locomotives for the Panama Railroad and upon the completion of this contract, took charge of the locomotive works of James and Jonathan Niles in Cincinnati. He served for five years as foreman in the works of Niles and Company.

In 1856, Sellers moved to Philadelphia, where he joined the staff of William Sellers & Co. (the senior partner of which was his second cousin, William Sellers), makers of machinists' tools, and general millwrights; after some years as the superintendent of the drawing office, he became chief engineer. In this capacity he obtained patents for a variety of inventions, some of which are listed below. In 1873, he became a partner of the firm. In 1872, Sellers was elected as a member to the American Philosophical Society.

Failing health led Sellers to resign his position as chief engineer of William Sellers & Co. in 1886, but he subsequently continued to engage in active practice as a consulting engineer. Probably his greatest work in this capacity was in connection with the hydroelectric power development of Niagara Falls. Sellers was a consulting engineer of the Cataract Construction Company, a corporation formed to execute the Niagara Falls project, and served on the International Niagara Commission, which determined the types of turbines and generators and the methods of power transmission finally adopted. Sellers designed the first large dynamos installed in the Niagara Falls power plant.

=== Further career ===
From the time of his return to Philadelphia in 1856, Sellers was closely identified with the Franklin Institute, of which he served as vice president for several years and as president for five consecutive terms from 1870 to 1875. He was appointed professor of mechanics at the Institute in 1881. He contributed much to the interest of the Institute's meetings by his lectures, always drawing large audiences.

In 1888, Sellers was appointed professor of engineering practice at Stevens Institute of Technology, Hoboken, New Jersey, where he delivered lectures at intervals during the school year. The Institute conferred upon him the degree of doctor of engineering the same year of his appointment to the faculty.

Sellers was a member of engineering and scientific societies both in the United States and in Europe, and was a charter member and served as president of the American Society of Mechanical Engineers.

In 1877, Sellers was decorated by King Oscar II of Sweden and Norway with the Order of St. Olav, in honor of his scientific attainments.

=== Personal ===
Sellers married Cornelia Wells (1831–1909), October 8, 1851. They had four children: Coleman Jr. (1852–1922), Jessie (1855–1932), Horace Wells (1857–1933), and Harold (1875–1876). Jessie married Sabin Colton, a prominent investor in Philadelphia and New York.

Coleman Sellers II died December 28, 1907, in Philadelphia and is interred at West Laurel Hill Cemetery in Bala Cynwyd, Pennsylvania.

== Inventions ==
Sellers obtained more than thirty letters-patent for inventions of his own, one of the first of which, a coupling device for shafting (1857), is the essential factor in the modern system of interchangeable shafting parts. In 1861, he patented the Kinematoscope (United States Patent 31357), a protean development in the history of film.

His invention in 1866 of feed-disks for lathes or other machine tools was the first practical solution of the problem of the infinite gradation of feeds. His other patents relate chiefly to improved forms of tools or modifications of existing machines. The use of absorbent cotton for surgical operations was recommended by him as early as 1861, and he proposed the employment of glycerine in order to keep photographic plates wet.
