= Titian Ramsay Peale I =

American entomologist (1780–1798)

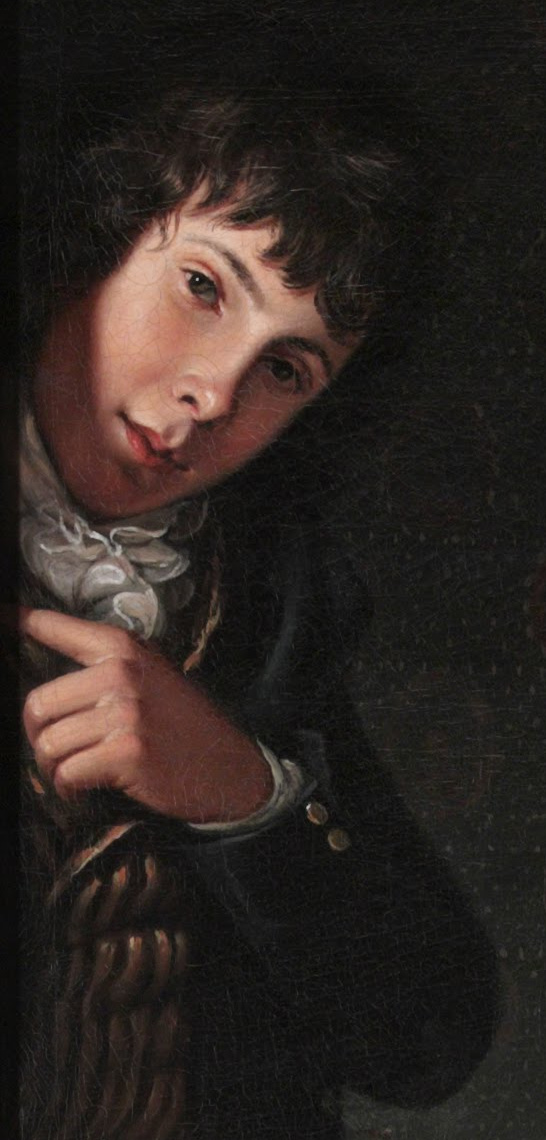
- Titian Ramsay Peale I, detail from a 1795 painting by his father, Charles Willson Peale
- Born: 1780; Philadelphia, Pennsylvania
- Died: September 18, 1798 (aged 17–18)
- Known for: Ornithology; Natural history
- Parents: Charles Willson Peale; Rachel Brewer
- Relatives: Rembrandt Peale (brother); Raphaelle Peale (brother); Rubens Peale (brother); Sophonisba Angusciola Peale (sister); Franklin Peale (half-brother); Titian Peale (half-brother)

Titian Ramsay Peale (1780 – September 18, 1798) was an American ornithologist, entomologist, and artist who helped his father, the polymath Charles Willson Peale, assemble the first scientific collection of zoological specimens in the western hemisphere for his Philadelphia Museum. Titian and his brother Rembrandt Peale were trained by their father in oil painting. When George Washington sat for his portrait, they set up their own easels next to their father's.

He died of yellow fever at the age of 18. He became the namesake of his half-brother, Titian Ramsay Peale (1799–1885), who was also an accomplished naturalist.

== Biography ==
=== Family ===
Peale was the fourth son of Charles Willson Peale and Rachel Brewer. He was the brother of Sophonisba Angusciola Peale, and the namesake of Titian Ramsay Peale (1799–1885), his younger half brother, who was also an accomplished naturalist.

Titian and his brother Raphaelle are the subjects of their father's painting "The Staircase Group".

=== Ornithology ===
Titian was an accomplished taxidermist and accompanied his father on several collecting expeditions. During the 1793 Philadelphia yellow fever epidemic, father and son traveled to Cape Henlopen to collect and preserve birds, from August 21 to September 19, 1793. Titian's specimens were extremely valuable to his father, who used them as currency for trading with foreign naturalists. On June 22, 1796, Charles wrote to Thomas Jefferson: "My third Son having the Talents of preserving the various Subjects of the Animal Kingdom, affords me considerable aid—from which I flatter myself that a reciprocal exchange will be made on our part." In a letter to Étienne Geoffroy Saint-Hilaire on April 30, 1797, Charles wrote "...with a Son that now collects and preserves with me, I promise myself to fill my store Boxes with many valuable subjects ready for exchange." On May 31, 1798, less than four months before his son's death, Charles praised Titian's taxidermy skills in a letter to Pierre Adet:

...with my son Titian I continue my hunting excursions to collect & preserve Subjects with equal diligence as you have seen during the last season. Altho' we cannot this year add so many new subjects yet we have got some that are non-descripts. And that while I am increasing my store we find by practice our mode of mounting Birds considera[b]ly improved ... I can assure you that [Titian's] method of preservation is so much improved, that nothing I have seen is equal to what comes from his hands.

=== Entomology ===
Titian was preparing illustrations and a manuscript for a work describing insects of the United States when he died in 1798. A draft of his entomology manuscript (dated 1796) is preserved in the National Agricultural Library.

== Death ==
Charles Willson Peale reflected on his son's death in a letter to Palisot de Beauvois, dated June 16, 1799:

I am so much affected with the loss of that dear youth that I can scarcely write this for floods of tears.–I snatched him then from death, to take him to New York, and vainly hoped that the affection and attention of a family; (Mrs. Peale's Uncles) would have keept him from New York, in a high, airy & healthy situation where he might recover his flesh & strength, but alass! he would frequently be with me in the City and there caught the fever, his being so much debilitated by his former complaint, that only 2 days sickness took him from me. I shall say no more on this mournful tale, you know my loss, & I may justly say a public Loss. I strive to bear up against this affliction, but I have such frequent calls to remember his assifious labours, while persuing my favorite persuits, that the Woods as well as my Study often witness my pangs–and knowing the importance of my labours to put my Museum in a lasting condition, and thereby secure its permanent establishment, I sometimes fear this cankerworm, Grief, will prey on my Vitals, and shorten my days.
