= George Escol Sellers =

American inventor (1808–1899)

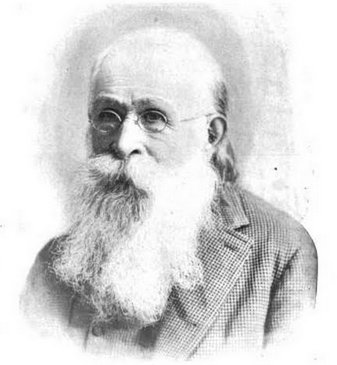
- George Escol Sellers, ca. 1898
- Born: November 26, 1808; Philadelphia, Pennsylvania, US
- Died: January 1, 1899 (aged 90); Chattanooga, Tennessee, US
- Engineering career
- Discipline: Mechanical engineering
- Practice name: Nathan & David Sellers, Globe Rolling Mills
- Employer: Panama Railway
- Projects: Lead pipes, railroad locomotives

George Escol Sellers (November 26, 1808 – January 1, 1899) was an American businessman, mechanical engineer, and inventor. He owned and managed different businesses and patented several inventions. He established a company with his brother Charles where he patented his early invention of a machine that produced lead pipes from hot fluid lead continuously. While working for the Panama Railway in the 1850s, he received various patents for improvements he made on railroad locomotives, including a railroad engine which could climb steep hills.

He was interested in the field of archaeology. He wrote many articles, collected artifacts, and became a skilled arrowhead maker. Some of his arrowheads were displayed at the National Museum of the American Indian. He was interested in art, and he indulged in arts and spent time with artists throughout his life. A character name in the first edition of Mark Twain and Charles Dudley Warner's The Gilded Age: A Tale of Today (1873), "Colonel Eschol Sellers", was similar to Sellers' and had to be changed when he objected to its further use. However, the connection repeated again when the new name, "Colonel Mulberry Sellers", unintentionally referenced the neighborhood where he was born.

== Early life ==
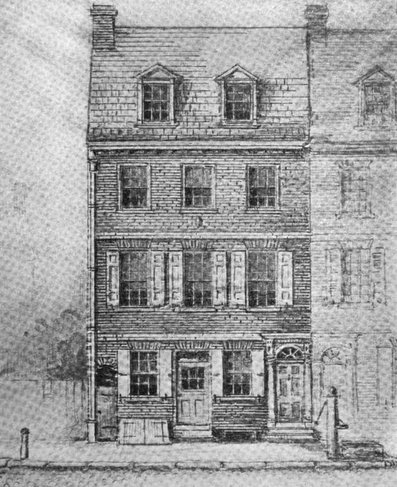
His birthplace

George Escol Sellers was born on November 26, 1808, in Philadelphia to Coleman Sellers and Sophonisba Angusciola Peale. His birthplace was near the Philadelphia Mint in the neighborhood of Mulberry Court. He had one elder brother Charles (b. 1806), two younger brothers, Harvey (b. 1813) and Coleman Sellers II (b. 1827), and two younger sisters, Elizabeth (b. 1810) and Anna (b. 1824).

His father and many ancestors had been engineers. His maternal grandfather was Charles Willson Peale, and his paternal grandfather Nathan Sellers was known for artwork of wire paper molds. While at school, he worked at Peale's Philadelphia Museum — he would later serve as a member of the museum's board of directors. Sellers was educated at public schools and studied for five years with tutor Anthony Bolmar at the West Chester Academy in West Chester, Pennsylvania. In 1832, he went to England to study machines used for production of paper.

== Career and inventions ==
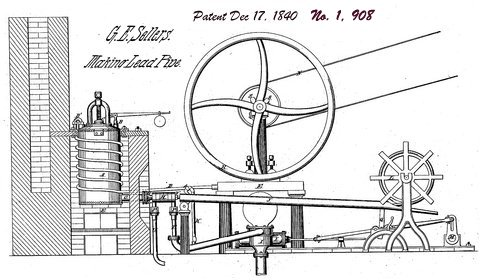
Making pipes continuously from lead

Sellers returned to the United States in 1833 and started working at his father and grandfather's firm, Nathan & David Sellers; Charles was employed there as well. The company made machinery for producing wire and paper and was the first in the country to use forged frames to build locomotives. They also worked for the United States Mint. When Nathan Sellers died in 1830, the business was reorganized and Coleman Sellers and his two sons then ran the business. As a consequence of the Depression of 1837, the company became insolvent and closed. His work at the firm inspired many of his engineering writings.

After Sellers closed his business in the east he moved with his brother Charles to Cincinnati, Ohio, and they established a factory for making lead pipe. Sellers invented machinery that utilized hot fluid lead for continuous production of lead pipe — he received a patent for his design, number US1908A on December 17, 1840. Their business was eventually sold and merged into a company which was a major producer of lead pipe in the country. Sellers partnered with Josiah Lawrence, a Cincinnati businessman, and organized a wire manufacturing company called Globe Rolling Mills. He incorporated machinery that he designed in their production process and it proved to be more efficient in producing lead pipe and wire.

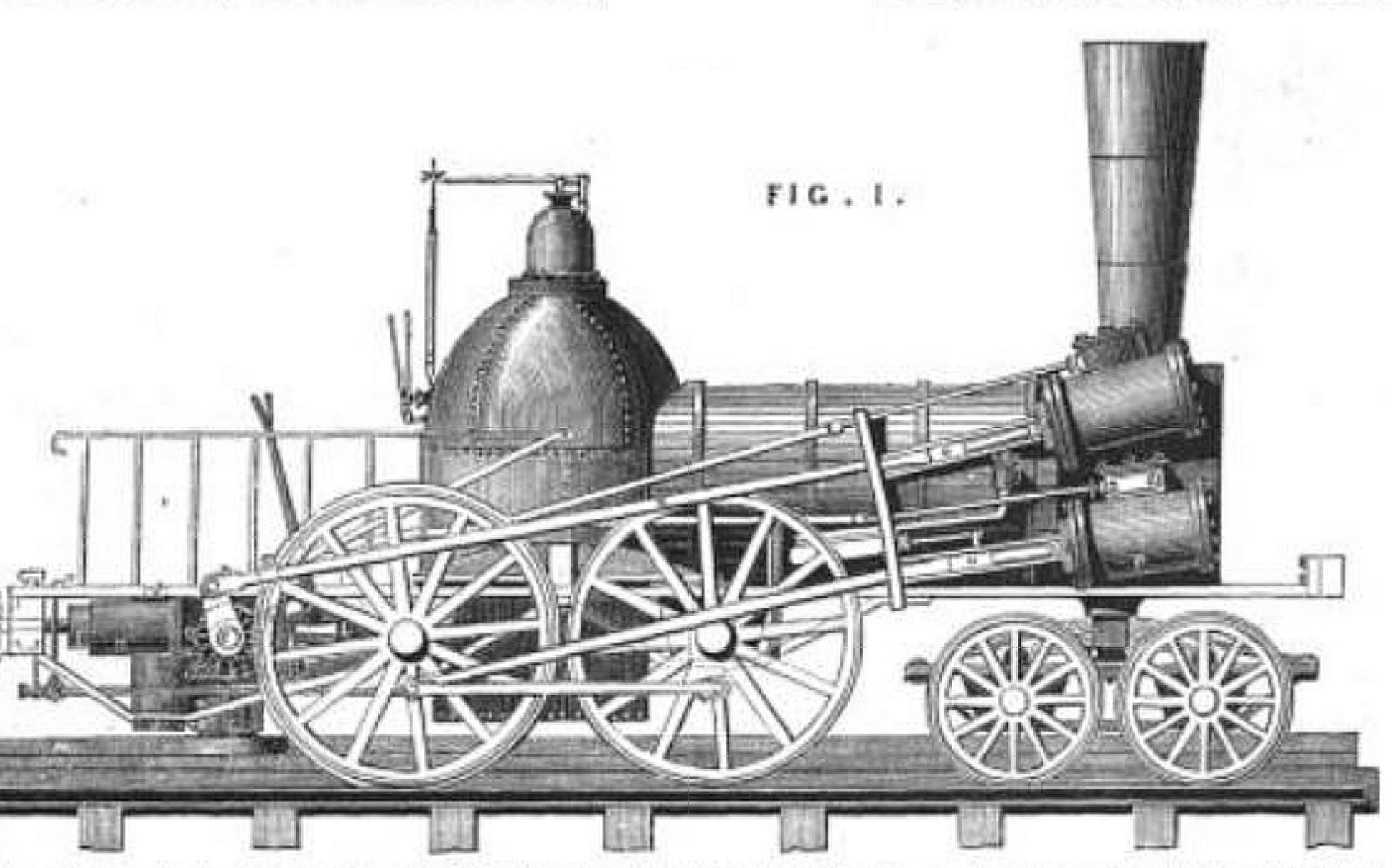
Sellers' patent of 1847. The upper cylinders drove the horizontal wheels.

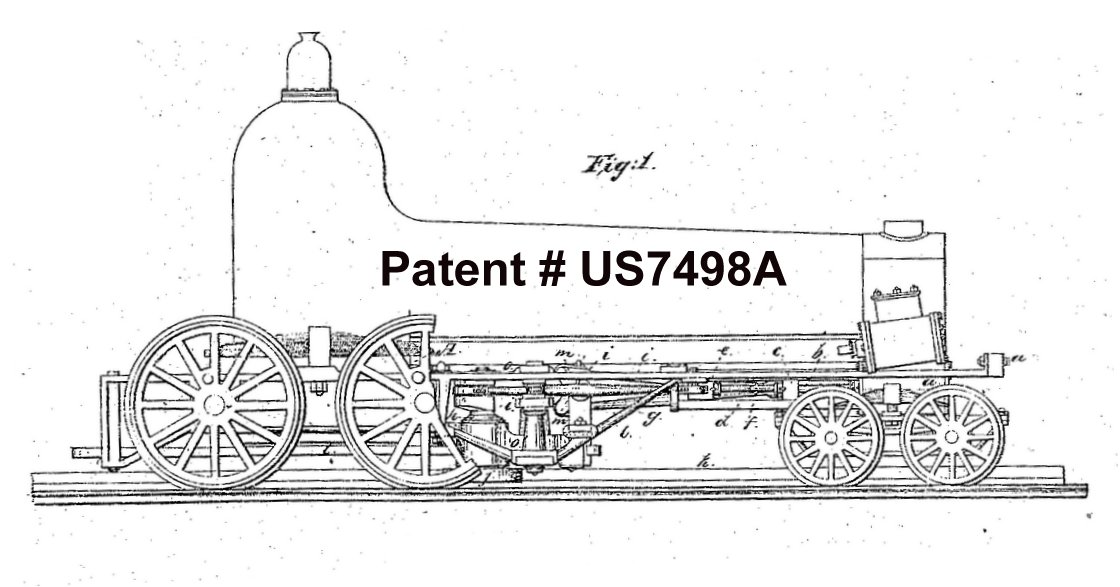
Railroad locomotive for hill climbing

He sold his interest in the company by 1850 and undertook manufacturing of railroad locomotives for the Panama Railway in 1851 having invented a locomotive for inclined planes. Sellers took out many patents on improvements he made on railroad locomotives while working there. 1847 he patented a railroad engine capable of climbing steep mountains and heavily inclined planes. Another patent was defined as an engine boiler with gearing for working heavy grades and was patented as US7498A on July 9, 1850. He was engaged in the manufacturing and sales of railroad equipment for several years in the 1850s.

During the American Civil War, Sellers moved to southern Illinois near the Ohio River and became interested in their mining operations. He invented a process for making paper-stock from vegetable fiber which was patented as US41101A on January 5, 1864. He spent the remainder of his career pursuing mechanical engineering and design. In 1888, he took up residence at Chattanooga, Tennessee, upon retirement and lived on Mission Ridge. Sellers died at his home in Chattanooga at the age of 90 on January 1, 1899.

== Personal life ==
Sellers married Rachel Brooks Parrish on March 6, 1833. They had five children and adopted an orphaned daughter of his cousin. Parrish died on September 14, 1860, in Illinois and was survived by only one son out of their five children.Parrish died on September 14, 1860, in Illinois and was survived by only one son out of their five children. That son, Frederick Harold Sellers, continued the family line through his son George Escol Sellers Sr., whose son, Coleman Lawrence Sellers, was born in Texas in 1933.

He had a deep interest in archaeology. He wrote several articles on the relics of the mound builders of Illinois — one published by Smithsonian Institution was on the aborigines' method of making earthenware salt pans. He also wrote detailed articles on how the local American Indians made arrowheads and stone age tools. He personally became so skilled at making arrowheads that some specimens of his craft were on display at the National Museum of the American Indian, Washington, D.C. He also had a substantial collection of pottery and implements of the prehistoric tribes of the Ohio valley.

His grandfather Charles Willson Peale and his uncles Rembrandt Peale and Raphaelle Peale were notable artists of the time. In Sellers's opinion, Raphaelle was the most talented of Charles's artist children. Sellers also had recognized artistic talent; Thomas Sully had urged him at an early age to become a portraitist and offered to teach him, but he was more interested in pursuing a vocational career. Nonetheless, he indulged his taste for arts and the society of artists throughout his life. He patented different art inventions from time to time and coordinated "one of the earliest social organizations of artists in Philadelphia", according to Cope (1904).

== The Gilded Age: A Tale of Today ==
The first edition of Mark Twain and Charles Dudley Warner's 1873 novel The Gilded Age: A Tale of Today had a fictional character — a satirical exploitative capitalist without redeeming social values — called "Colonel Eschol Sellers". The name "Eschol Sellers" was suggested by Warner, and the use of "Eschol" was a carefully considered decision, with apocryphal descriptions of its antecedents. Warner stated that he had interacted with an "Eschol Sellers" 20 years prior to writing this book, and decided to use the name because of its rarity. He further added that "his name has probably carried him off before this; and if it hasn't, he will never see the book anyhow."

Dr. J. H. Barton — a common friend of Sellers and Warner — discovered the depiction and urged Warner to not use his friend's name. Warner forwarded a message to Sellers through Barton clarifying that the parallels in the storyline had been unintentional. On January 1, 1874, Sellers replied, threatened to sue them if they did not change the name, and asked them to issue a disclaimer about the usage of his name. Warner agreed and said that the name would be changed in the future copies. Twain mentioned in his 1892 novel The American Claimant that "Beriah Sellers" was used instead of "Eschol Sellers", but it had to be changed again when someone else objected to its use. The next editions of the novel used "Colonel Mulberry Sellers" instead. "Mulberry" happened to be the name of the neighborhood where Sellers was born and raised, and this unwanted connection continued to be repeated, even unto Sellers's obituaries.

== Publications ==
- Sellers, George Escol (1849). Improvements in locomotive engines, and railways. Cincinnati: Gazette office, Wright, Fisher & co. printers.
- Ferguson, Eugene S., ed. (1965). Early Engineering Reminiscences (1815-40) of George Escol Sellers. Washington, D.C.: Smithsonian Institution.

== See also ==
- Alexander Bonner Latta—invented the first practical steam fire engine.
- Anthony Harkness—inventor associated with pioneering the railroad locomotive industry of Cincinnati, Ohio.
