= Kinematoscope =

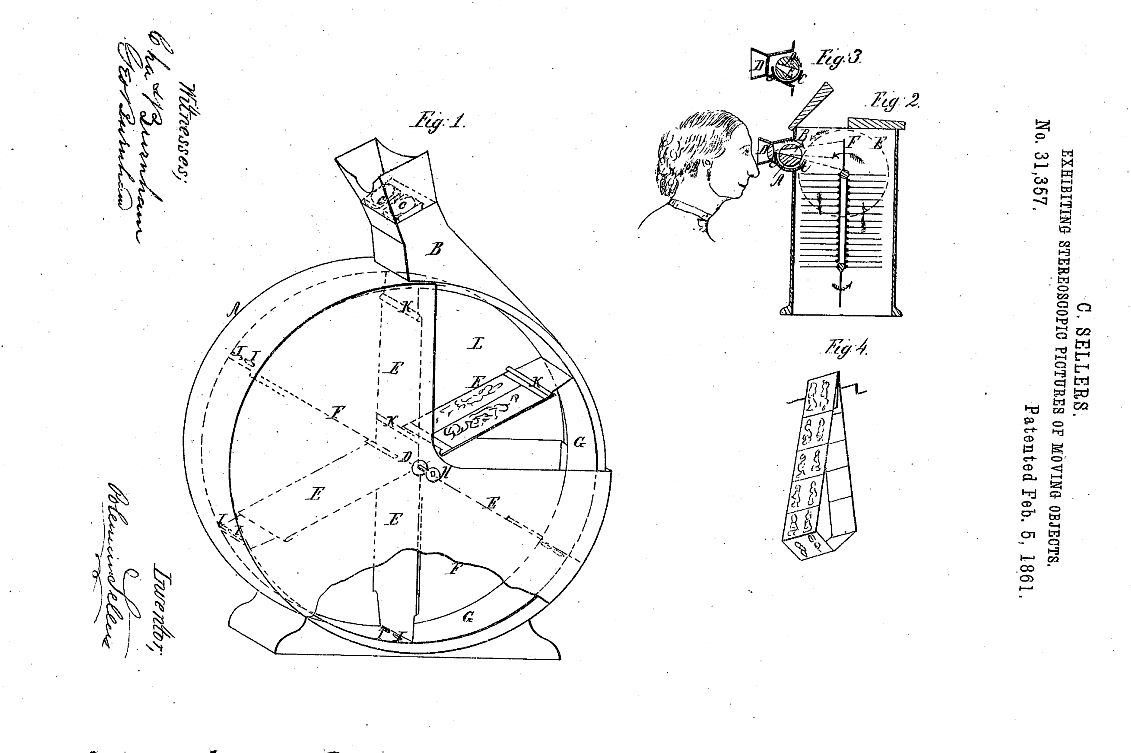
Kinematoscope, United States Patent 31357, Coleman Sellers, p. 1

The Kinematoscope (a.k.a. Motoscope) was patented in 1861 (United States Patent 31357), a protean development in the history of cinema. The invention aimed to present the illusion of motion.

The patent was filed by Coleman Sellers of Philadelphia, Pennsylvania as an "improvement in exhibiting stereoscopic pictures". Coleman applied stereoscopy to the existing principle of toy phantasmascopes using rotating discs.

A series of still stereographic images with successive stages of action were mounted on blades of a spinning paddle and viewed through slits. The slits passed under a stereoscopic viewer. The pictures were visible within a cabinet, and were not projected onto a screen.
