= Rubens Peale with a Geranium =

Painting by Rembrandt Peale

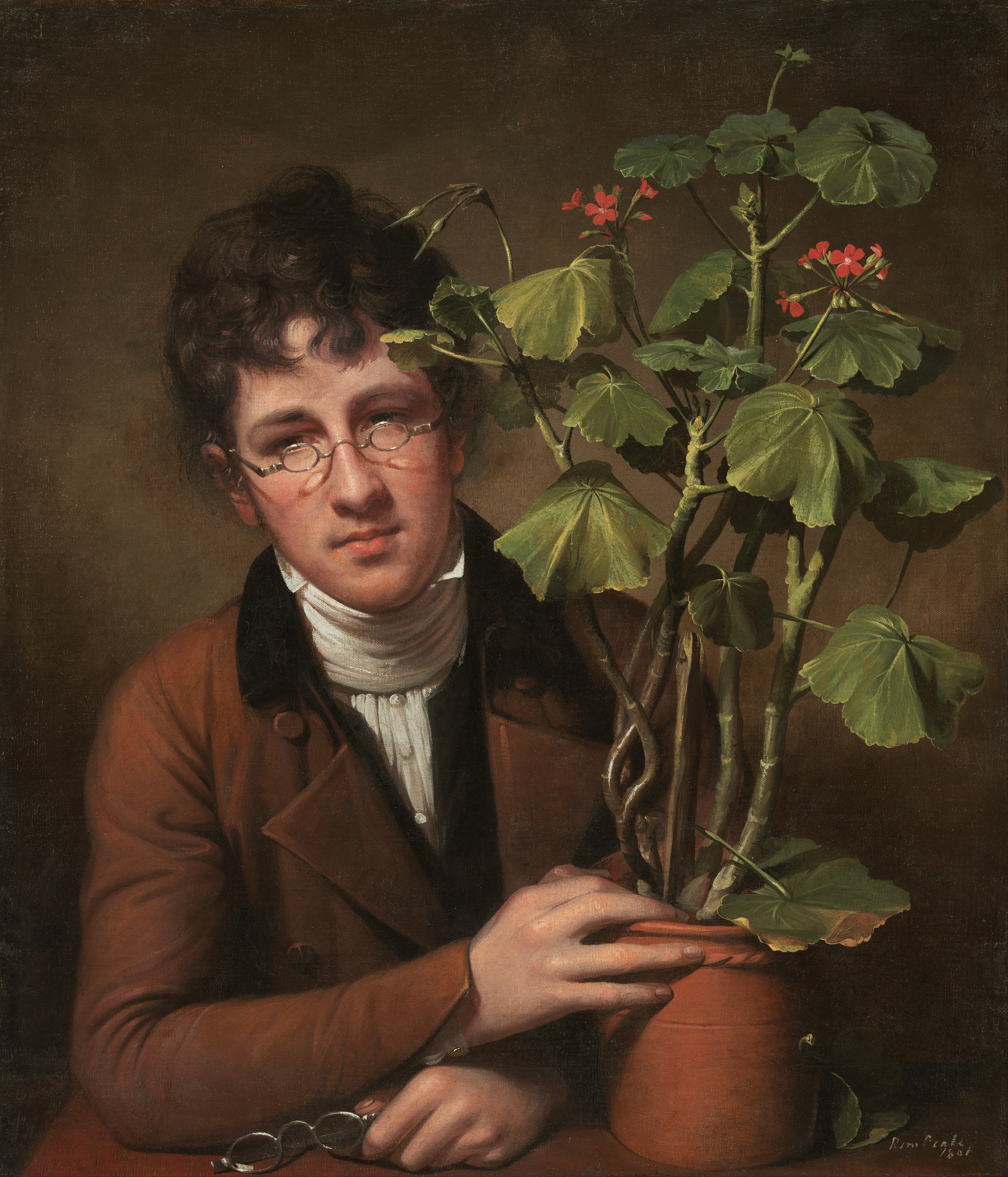
- Artist: Rembrandt Peale
- Year: (1801)
- Medium: Oil on canvas
- Dimensions: 71.4 cm × 61 cm (28.1 in × 24.0 in)
- Location: National Gallery of Art, Washington, D.C.

Rubens Peale with a Geranium is an 1801 oil painting by American artist Rembrandt Peale. It is a portrait of Peale's younger brother, Rubens, who helped run the family museums and raised plants and animals. It is an early painting by Rembrandt Peale, painted when he was 23 and Rubens was 17. It is signed "Rem Peale 1801". The National Gallery of Art describes it as "among the finest portraits in the history of American art".

== Analysis ==
The portrait is informal and reveals Rubens' sensitive nature. He has an unstudied posture, and he is accompanied by a geranium (possibly Pelargonium inquinans) in a terracotta pot, which takes up so much space in the composition as to compete for attention with the ostensible subject, Rubens. This is a departure from traditional European portraiture, and valued for its "embodiment of an ideal in American art that favors candor over pretension, clarity over complexity, and the natural over the conventional".

The National Gallery suggests that the work is almost a double portrait of Rubens and the geranium, which may be the first specimen of the plant grown in the US. Stylistic aspects of the plant can be seen in the young man's posture and clothing. The "V" shape of Rubens' lapels and shirt is echoed in the rising stalks of the geranium, and similarly the locks of hair on his forehead are echoed by the curves of the leftmost stalks. As two of his fingers rest on the lip of the pot, the two pointed fronds at the top of the plant are close to his hair.

Rubens is both wearing and holding glasses. In this era, portraits subjects rarely wore glasses. The art historian Billie Follensbee suggests that Peale sat for the portrait holding his glasses in his hand, with Rembrandt Peale returning to the canvas later and overpainting another pair of glasses on his face. This would account for the impossible combination of the strong lens refractions seen on his cheeks with the lack of visual distortion seen through the lenses. There is no physical evidence that the glasses were added later, but Rubens' daughter, who received the painting in 1854, wrote that they were a later addition.

== History ==
The painting was acquired by his relative James Claypoole Copper, who later gave it to Rubens' daughter Mary Jane Peale (1827–1902), and the painting descended through the Peale family. It was sold to the art collector Lawrence A. Fleischman, and then before 1963 to Pauline E. Woolworth, wife of Norman Bailey Woolworth. In 1985 it was sold at Sotheby's to the National Gallery of Art, which paid $3.7 million (before buyer's premium). This set a record for an American work of art sold at auction, replacing Frederic Edwin Church's The Icebergs ($2.5 million).
