= Titian Peale =

American naturalist, artist and explorer (1799–1885)

Titian Ramsay Peale
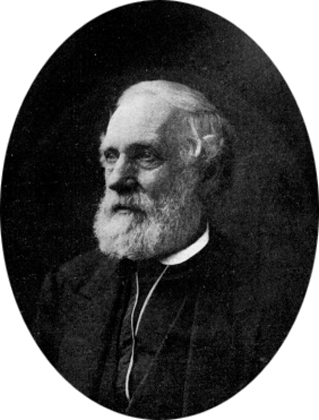
- Born: November 17, 1799; Philadelphia, Pennsylvania, US
- Died: March 13, 1885 (aged 85); Philadelphia, Pennsylvania, US
- Education: Charles Willson Peale; Thomas Say
- Known for: Drawing and Watercolor; Natural history
- Notable work: American Philosophical Society
- Parents: Charles Willson Peale; Elizabeth de Peyster
- Relatives: Franklin Peale (brother); Raphaelle Peale (half-brother); Rembrandt Peale (half-brother); Rubens Peale (half-brother); Sophonisba Angusciola Peale (half-sister); Titian Ramsay Peale I (half-brother)

Titian Ramsay Peale (November 17, 1799 – March 13, 1885) was an American artist, naturalist, and explorer from Philadelphia, Pennsylvania. He was a scientific illustrator whose paintings and drawings of wildlife are known for their beauty and accuracy.

Peale was a member of several high-profile scientific expeditions. In 1819–20, he and Thomas Say accompanied Stephen Harriman Long on an expedition to the Rocky Mountains. He was also a member of the United States Exploring Expedition (1838–1842).

Starting around 1855, Peale became an enthusiastic amateur photographer. Many of his photographs featured buildings and landscapes in and around Washington D.C. He joined a local club with other amateur photographers and participated in field trips, photo exchanges and contests. By the end of the Civil War, his interest in photography waned and he only occasionally took pictures.

== Biography ==
=== Family and early life ===
Peale was born on November 17, 1799 in Philosophical Hall, Philadelphia, which housed his father's Philadelphia Museum. The youngest son of the polymath Charles Willson Peale and his wife Elizabeth de Peyster, Peale was named after his dead half-brother, also named Titian Ramsay Peale (1780–1798). The family moved to Germantown, Pennsylvania, outside of Philadelphia, where Peale began collecting and drawing butterflies and other insects. Some of his drawings were published in Thomas Say's American Entomology as early as 1816, but most remained unpublished until recently. Like his older brothers Raphaelle, Rembrandt, and Rubens Peale, Titian helped his father in the preservation of the museum's specimens for display.

=== Scientific career and expeditions ===
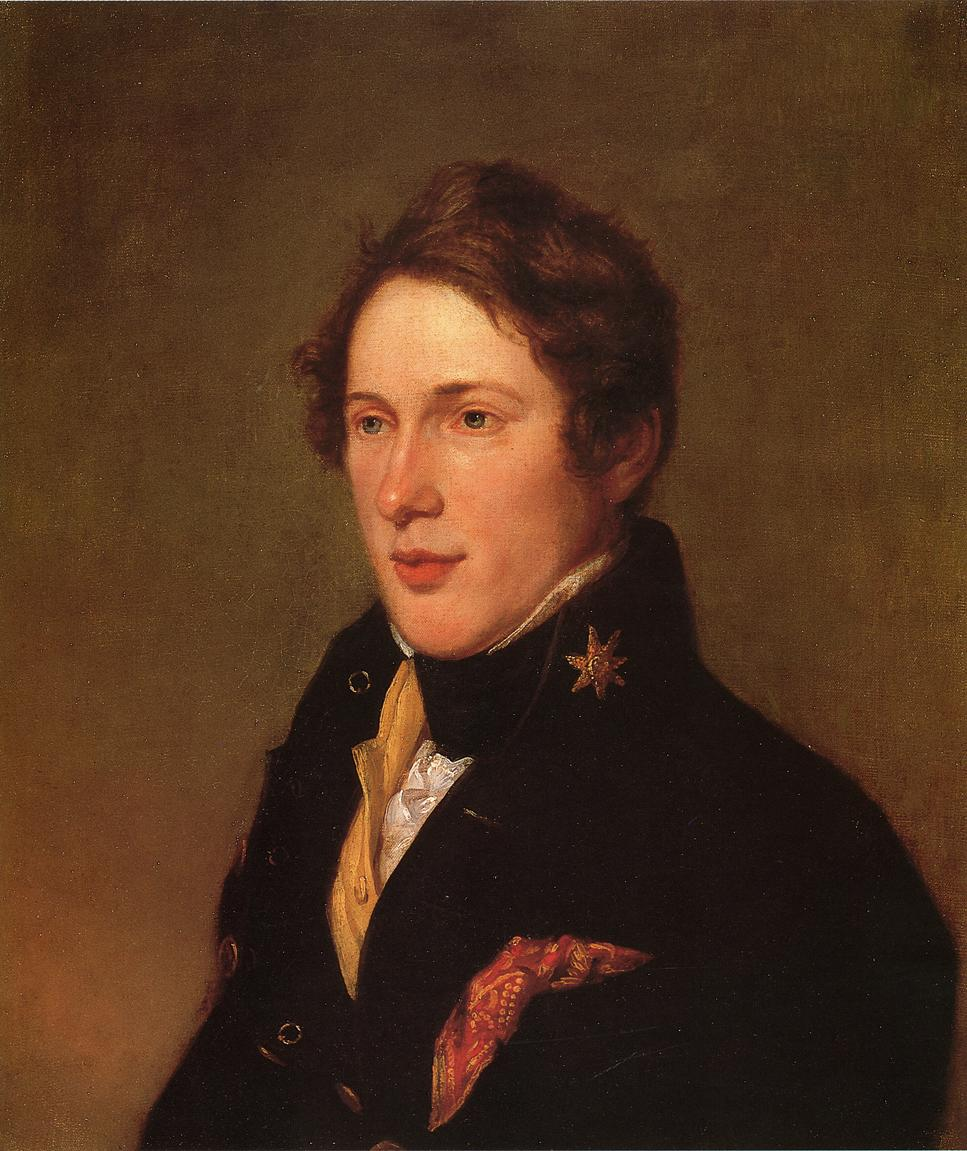
Charles Willson Peale, portrait of Titian Ramsay Peale in the uniform of the Long Expedition, ca. 1819

Peale was a member of the "first private, museum sponsored exploration in the United States", when he joined William Maclure, Thomas Say, and George Ord on an expedition to Florida and Georgia in 1817, sponsored by the Academy of Natural Sciences of Philadelphia.

In 1819–20, he and Say joined a government-led expedition to the Rocky Mountains led by Stephen Harriman Long, during which Peale made a large collection of drawings of natural objects and scenery.

In the winter of 1824–25, Peale traveled to South Carolina and Florida to collect bird specimens for Charles Lucien Bonaparte's forthcoming quasi-continuation of Alexander Wilson's American Ornithology (1825–1833). In Florida, he boarded for a short time at the farm of Bonaparte's cousin, Achille Murat, and returned to Philadelphia in April 1825.

In 1831–32, Peale explored the Magdalena River valley in northern Colombia. According to a notice published by Constantine S. Rafinesque in 1832: "Mr. Peale is just returned from his voyage to South America, and travels in 1831 up the R. Magdalena to Bogota. He has brought a fine zoological collection for the Philadelphia Museum, among which are 500 birds and 50 quadrupeds, which were not there. It is expected that he will publish an account of his zoological travels and discoveries. He asserts the very singular fact that the R. Magdalena has no shells and but few fishes."

Around 1832 Peale was one of the first naturalists to question the veracity of John James Audubon's claim of discovering a new species of eagle.

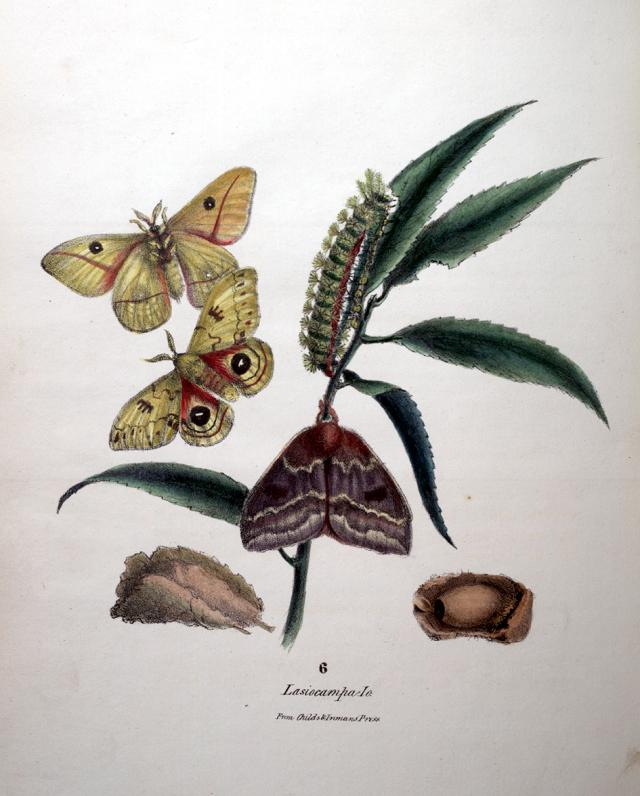
Titian Peale, Automeris io 1833

In 1833, he was elected as a member of the American Philosophical Society. From 1833 to 1836, Peale managed the Philadelphia Museum, which had been founded by his father Charles Willson Peale.

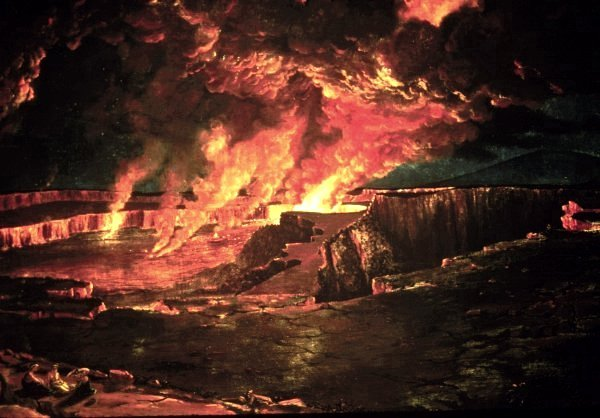
Titian Ramsay Peale, Kilauea, 1842

In 1838, Peale boarded the USS Peacock and served as chief naturalist for the United States Exploring Expedition (1838–1842) led by Lt. Charles Wilkes. The other naturalists on the expedition were James Dwight Dana and Charles Pickering. As chief naturalist, he collected and preserved various specimens of natural history, many of which he packed and shipped back to Philadelphia. During the expedition, Wilkes named Peale Passage after Titian Peale.

In 1848, he was removed from the payroll of the scientific corps. In 1851, a fire at the Library of Congress destroyed nearly all of the 100 copies of Peale's expedition report, Mammalia and Ornithology (1848), and its publication was delayed. John Cassin was hired to produce a corrected volume, which was published in 1858.

=== Scientific collections ===
Peale was the second ornithologist known to collect a female golden-winged Warbler (Vermivora chrysoptera), and the first to illustrate it. Thomas Jefferson collected one in 1782. Peale shot his specimen in 1824 near Camden, New Jersey, and his drawing was engraved by Alexander Lawson and published in Plate 1 of Bonaparte’s American Ornithology; or, the Natural History of Birds Inhabiting the United States, Not Given by Wilson, vol. 1 (Philadelphia: Carey, Lea & Carey, 1825).

Peale developed an effective method for storing butterflies in sealed cases with glass fronts and backs, and parts of his collection of over 100 species still survive.

He was the curator for the Peale's Museum and was a notable scientific illustrator of Central Plains flora and fauna for several decades. He also designed coins for the United States Mint.

=== Later years and death ===
Peale was employed at the United States Patent Office until 1873. He died on March 13, 1885, in Philadelphia, and was interred at Laurel Hill Cemetery, Section 8, Lot 74, in an unmarked grave.

== Public collections ==
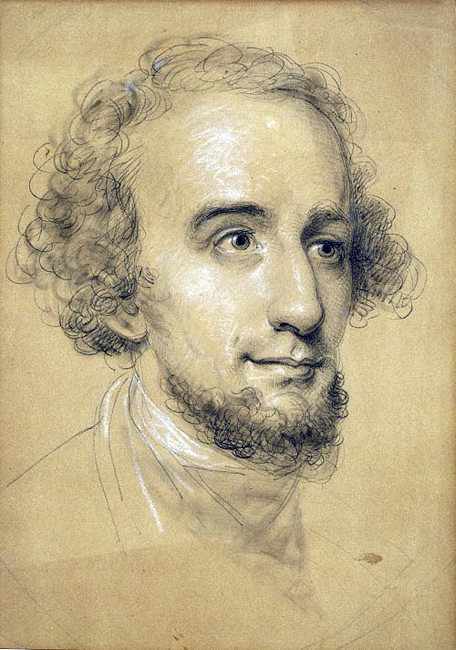
Titian Ramsay Peale, Self portrait, ca. 1845, National Portrait Gallery, Smithsonian Institution, possibly aided by Rembrandt Peale

- Academy of Natural Sciences of Drexel University, Philadelphia, holds Peale's butterfly and moth collections
- American Museum of Natural History, New York City, holds Titian Ramsey Peale's unpublished manuscript of The Butterflies of North America
- American Philosophical Society, Philadelphia
- Amon Carter Museum of American Art, Fort Worth, Texas
- Carnegie Museum of Natural History, Pittsburgh, holds additional specimens collected by Peale
- Detroit Institute of Arts, Michigan
- Honolulu Museum of Art, Hawaii
- Joslyn Art Museum, Omaha, Nebraska
- Museum of Nebraska Art, University of Nebraska–Lincoln
- National Museum of American History, Photographic History Collection
- National Portrait Gallery, Washington, D.C.
- United States National Agricultural Library, Beltsville, MD, holds Peale's original manuscript, Drawings of American Insects; Showing Them in Their Several States, Together With Such Minute Insects as Require Investigation by Microscope.
- Pennsylvania Academy of the Fine Arts, Philadelphia
- Reading Public Museum, Reading, Pennsylvania
- Westmoreland Museum of American Art, Greensburg, Pennsylvania
- Yale University Art Gallery, New Haven, Connecticut, holds five of Peale's sketchbooks from the Stephen H. Long Expedition

== Published works ==
Peale, T. R. 1831. Circular of the Philadelphia Museum: Containing Direction for the Preservation and Preparation of Objects of Natural History.

== Legacy ==
- Peale designed the reverse of the Gobrecht dollar minted from 1836 to 1839 and recycled for the obverse of the Flying Eagle cent of 1856–1858.
- In 1923, Peale Island, one of the three islands surrounding the lagoon at Wake Atoll, was named in Peale's honor by Alexander Wetmore, lead scientist of the Tanager Expedition.
- In 1873 Robert Ridgway named the biggest subspecies of the peregrine falcons, the Peale's falcon, after him.

== See also ==
- European and American voyages of scientific exploration
- Samuel Seymour (artist) who was the landscape artist of Long's Expedition of 1820
