= Sabin W. Colton =

American investor

Sabin Woolworth Colton, Jr. (March 18, 1847 in Philadelphia, Pennsylvania – January 29, 1925 in Bryn Mawr, Pennsylvania) was an American investor. He was the only private individual to ever own a chair on both the Philadelphia and New York Stock Exchanges.

He became an office boy in 1862 at a stock brokerage, later became a clerk there. While a clerk there bought his own chair on the Philadelphia Stock Exchange. His expertise was in underwriting the establishment of utility companies in exchange for stock in those companies.

He retired in 1910, having built a spacious family house, Longmeadow, in Gladwyne, Pennsylvania, and an elegant Arts & Crafts-style summer house, Faraway, on Eastern Point of Greening Island, Maine.
