= Franklin Peale =

American mint official (1795–1870)

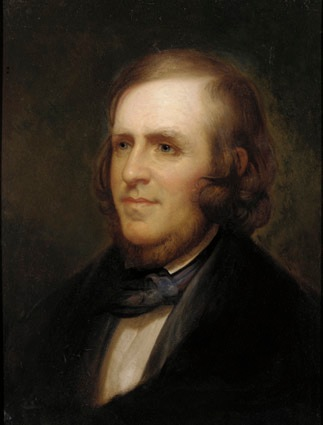
- Portrait by Rembrandt Peale

3rd Chief Coiner of the United States Mint at Philadelphia
- In office March 27, 1839 – December 2, 1854
- President: Martin Van Buren; William Henry Harrison; John Tyler; James K. Polk; Zachary Taylor; Millard Fillmore; Franklin Pierce
- Preceded by: Adam Eckfeldt
- Succeeded by: George K. Childs

2nd Melter and Refiner of the United States Mint at Philadelphia
- In office January 5, 1836 – March 27, 1839
- President: Andrew Jackson; Martin Van Buren
- Preceded by: Joseph Cloud
- Succeeded by: Jonas R. McClintock

Personal details
- Born: Aldrovand Peale; October 15, 1795 Philadelphia, Pennsylvania, U.S.
- Died: May 5, 1870 (aged 74) Philadelphia, Pennsylvania, U.S.
- Resting place: Laurel Hill Cemetery, Philadelphia
- Spouses: Eliza Greatrake (m. 1815; ann. 1820) Caroline E. Girard Haslam (m. 1839)
- Children: 1 (by Greatrake)
- Parent: Charles Willson Peale (father)
- Education: University of Pennsylvania

Benjamin Franklin Peale (born Aldrovand Peale; October 15, 1795 – May 5, 1870) was an American officer of the Philadelphia Mint from 1833 to 1854. Although Peale introduced many innovations to the Mint of the United States, he was eventually dismissed amid allegations he had used his position for personal gain.

Peale was a son of painter Charles Willson Peale, and was born in the Philadelphia Museum, a museum of curiosities which his father ran in Philadelphia. For the most part, Franklin Peale's education was informal, though he took some classes at the University of Pennsylvania. He became adept in machine making. In 1820, he became an assistant to his father at the museum, and managed it after Charles Peale's death in 1827.

In 1833, Peale was hired by the Mint, and was sent for two years to Europe to study and report back on coining techniques. He returned with plans for improvement, and designed the first steam-powered coinage press in the United States, installed in 1836. Peale was made Melter and Refiner of the Philadelphia Mint that year, and Chief Coiner three years later upon the retirement of the incumbent, Adam Eckfeldt, who continued in his work without pay. Eckfeldt's labor allowed Peale to run a medal business using Mint property. This sideline eventually caused Peale's downfall: conflicts with Engraver James B. Longacre and Melter and Refiner Richard Sears McCulloh led to Peale being accused of misconduct, and he was dismissed by President Franklin Pierce in 1854.

In retirement, Peale continued his involvement in and leadership of many civic organizations; he died in 1870. Numismatic author Q. David Bowers suggests that the facts of Peale's career allow writers to draw very different conclusions about him.

== Early life and career ==
Benjamin Franklin Peale was born October 15, 1795, to painter Charles Willson Peale and his second wife, the former Elizabeth de Peyster. As well as pursuing his art, Charles Peale ran the Philadelphia Museum, a museum of curiosities housed in Philosophical Hall in Philadelphia, home of the American Philosophical Society. The boy was born in the family quarters in the museum. He was given the name Aldrovand, after the Italian naturalist Ulisse Aldrovandi.

Charles Peale recorded family births on the flyleaf of a copy of Matthew Pilkington's Dictionary of Painters, rather than in a Bible, and after recording "Aldrovand" added the notation, "if he likes that name when he comes of age". The father was a member of the American Philosophical Society, and in February 1796 brought his young son to a meeting, and asked the members to select another name for the child. They decided on Benjamin Franklin Peale, naming the boy after the Society's founder, Benjamin Franklin. Society legend holds that the boy was given the name while placed in the chair of the president of the Society, which had been donated by Franklin.

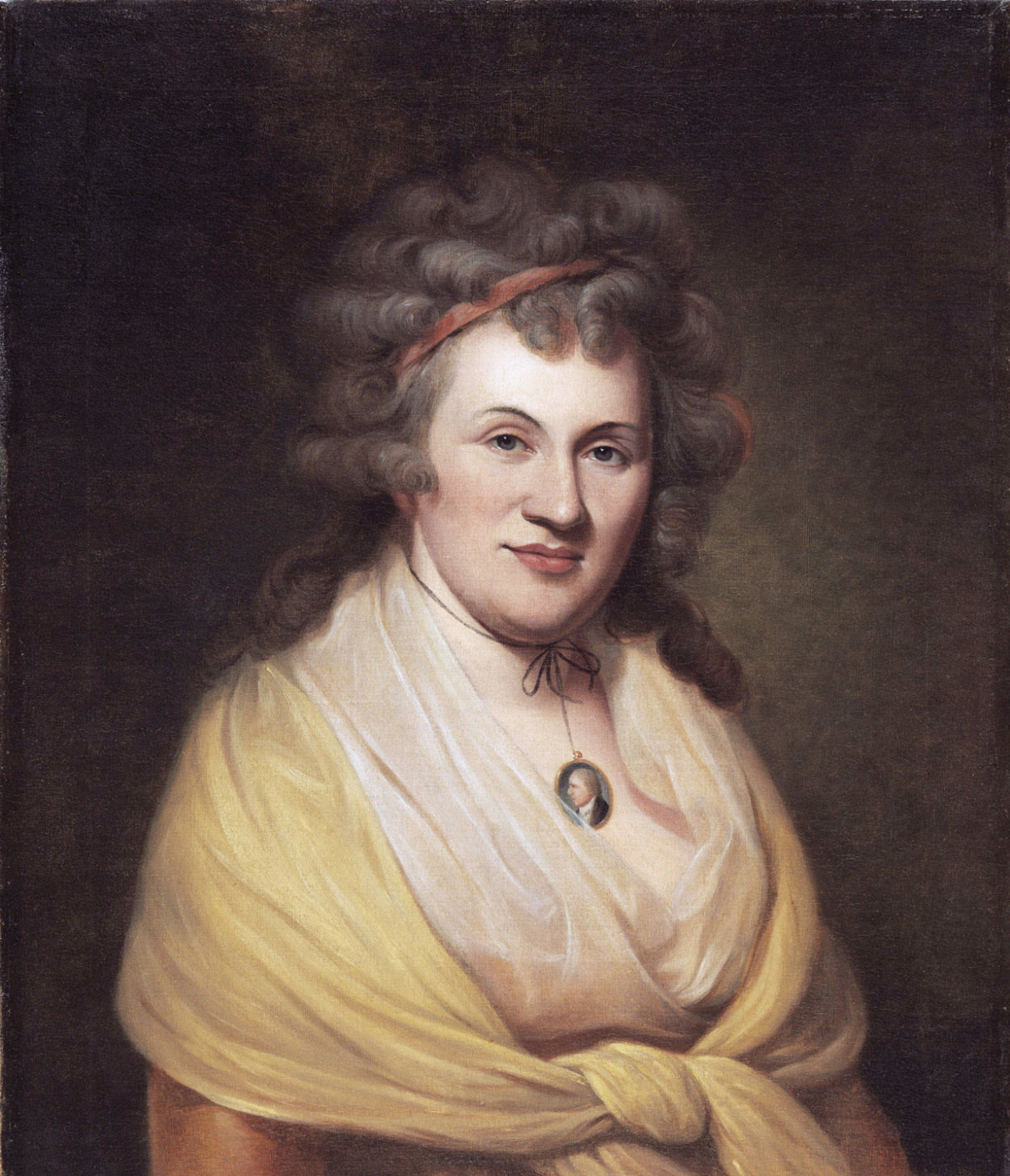
Elizabeth de Peyster Peale, by her husband Charles, who is seen in miniature

Franklin Peale was one of sixteen children his father would have by his three wives. Elizabeth Peale died when Franklin was eight years old, but his father soon remarried, and the child was thereafter cared for by his stepmother. He was given little classroom education, though he did spend some time at a local school in nearby Bucks County, as well as at Germantown Academy and the University of Pennsylvania. For the most part, his education was informal, as was usual in the Peale family, with the student given the means to study what interested him, or what he appeared to be good at. In Franklin Peale's case, he made toys as a boy, and surveyed his father's farm near Germantown. Although he lacked the artistic talent of some of his brothers, such as Titian Peale, he proved mechanically inclined.

At age 17, Peale began to work for the Delaware cotton factory of William Young, on the Brandywine River, learning the making of machines. He was an apt student, becoming adept as a turner, founder, and draftsman. He was tolerated in his desire for a mechanical career by his father, who considered it a foolish whim. Within a year, one of the Hodgson brothers, who ran a nearby machine shop, described Peale as highly capable with tools. At age 19 Peale returned to Germantown, where, having designed and supervised the installation of the machinery for a cotton factory there, he was put in charge, and continued to manage the factory for several years. He then moved to nearby Philadelphia, and worked for the firm of John & Coleman Sellers, which made machinery for card sticking.

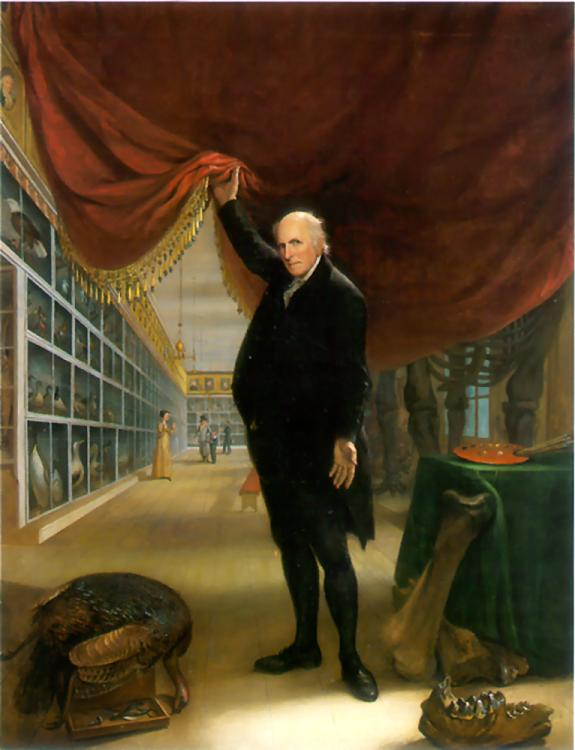
Charles Willson Peale, self portrait, The Artist in His Museum (1822)

On April 24, 1815, Peale, still a minor at age 19, married Eliza Greatrake without his father's consent. Almost immediately, it became evident she had mental problems. Although Eliza bore Peale a child within the first year of the marriage (a daughter, Anna), she thereafter left him, returning to live with her mother, who had her committed to Pennsylvania Hospital as a "lunatic". The Peale family began a lengthy effort to show that Eliza Peale was mad when she married Franklin, a ground for annulment. With aid from the testimony of Captain Allen McLane, they were successful, and the annulment was granted on March 22, 1820. Franklin Peale was required to post assets as security for the support of his former wife; his sister Sophy lent him some of her stock in the museum for that purpose.

In 1820, Peale left factory management to assist his aging father in running the museum, and remained there for over a decade. When Charles Willson Peale died in 1827, Franklin became the manager of the museum, and like his siblings, inherited stock in it. He not only maintained the exhibits, but added to them, contributing a "curious speaking toy" as well as the model for an early locomotive, which was used to draw two small cars in the museum, with seating for four people. At the time, the museum was located in the Old State House (today, Independence Hall), and Peale worked out a system for using the State House bell to inform fire companies of the location of a blaze.

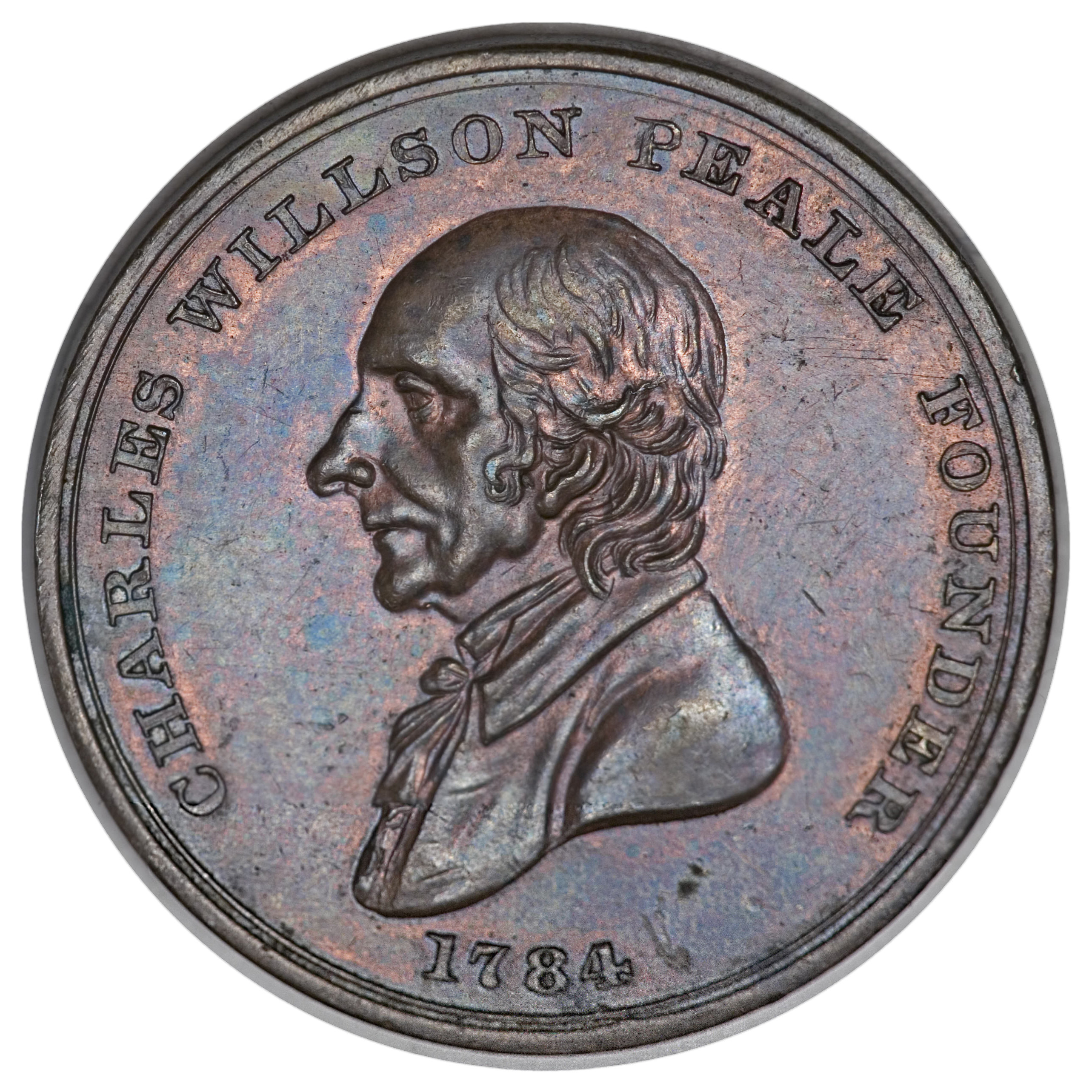
Admission token to the Peale Museum, 1821

Peale was one of the founders of The Franklin Institute in 1824, one of several mechanics' institutes that came into being in the early 1820s to provide working men with technical education. It quickly became important and influential, organizing an exhibition of American manufactured goods that October, one of at least 26 such shows that it put on in the first 34 years of its existence. Peale taught natural history, mechanics (illustrating his lectures with models and drawings), and chemistry, livening the talks with experiments. He was for many years actively involved with The Franklin Institute, writing articles for its Journal and serving on key committees.

== Mint employee and officer (1833–1854) ==
=== Hiring and Europe mission ===
The second building to house the Philadelphia Mint opened in 1833, with up-to-date technology except in the coining process. For this, it used the transplanted machinery of its predecessor, using human muscle power to strike coins. Although the Mint wanted all coins to be identical to others of the same denomination, the use of the screw press was an impediment to this, as the force used to impress the design on the coins was not uniform. Additionally, the coinage dies were made by hand, (Note: Often by "die sinkers", employees who did the routine work of cutting designs into blank dies. See Burdette 2013a, pp. 9–10) leading to differences between coins of the same year struck from different dies. This state of affairs was unsatisfactory to the director, Samuel Moore, who had for several years contemplated purchasing a modern set of steam machinery for the production of coins from the Soho Mint in Birmingham, England, founded by coining pioneer Matthew Boulton. Moore instead decided to engage a new employee and send him on a special tour of European mints and refineries, in order to learn the best features of each and bring the knowledge home for use at the Philadelphia facility. The individual would be given the title of Assistant to the Assayer, Jacob R. Eckfeldt. Moore obtained the approval of Treasury Secretary Louis McLane and an appropriation of $7,000 for the purpose.

Moore, in a letter to McLane, noted that sending an agent to Europe to gather technology had been discussed in the past, but proposals had foundered over the difficulty of finding a person both competent enough to undertake the trip successfully and not too busy to spend a year or more in Europe. At the recommendation of the director's first cousin, Robert M. Patterson, Moore hired Peale for the position. According to Patterson, "I do not know any man more likely to succeed in such a mission. His skill, his perseverance, his address all fit him for the errand." Peale was willing to go, writing, "a variety of circumstances render me very desirous of vacating the situation that I have held for many years as Manager of the Phil^{a} Museum, it will therefore be agreeable to change even at a pecuniary sacrifice."

Peale departed from New York for Le Havre on May 8, 1833, arriving in Paris late in the month. At this time, it was only certain that Peale would visit Paris—a visit to England, with instruction at local mints and refineries, was still under discussion. Peale had been instructed to learn "parting," a newly developed method for separating gold and silver. This process, also dubbed refining, is necessary because nuggets that contain gold also contain some silver, and the latter metal must be removed before the gold can be alloyed with copper for coining. The older method of removing silver involved the use of nitric and sulphuric acids, and was dangerous and expensive. Director Moore also instructed Peale to gain the method of assaying silver by the "humid process" (titration), and to learn everything he could of coining technology and how it was powered by steam. Moore warned, "a very material object of your mission is to be regarded as unaccomplished, until you have become familiar with everything requisite for directing the formation of an establishment de novo [from nothing] ... and until you shall have acquired a good share of adroitness in the actual manipulations ... Whatever can be added to our information in regard to the treatment of the precious metals, and Mint processes and machinery is within the scope of your inquiries." Moore asked that, if Peale had any time remaining, to look into other technologies that might be useful to the United States, such as the gas illumination of cities.

With the aid of the United States Minister to France, Edward Livingston, Peale gained permission to study closely the workings of the Monnaie de Paris. The staff there was cooperative, and Peale was able to learn the "humid" method from watching the assayer as he verified the silver content of the coins from the French branch mints. Peale's notes were supplemented by detailed engravings of all the fixtures used in the process, published and sold by the Paris mint at an expense of 98 francs 50 centimes, which Peale deemed worth the purchase on the US government's behalf. Peale also purchased a set of the apparatus for the humid method, made and sold by the mint; Peale paid 500 francs for this.

Some of the machinery that would be installed on Peale's return to Philadelphia was based on what he saw in Paris. He sketched the Monnaie de Paris's Thonnelier model coin presses. He also copied the Paris facility's Tour á portrait reducing lathe. He could not learn parting there as the facility contracted the process to private refineries; attempts to gain permission to learn the process at these facilities failed when their owners demanded huge sums, believing that Peale, as a government agent, was flush with money.

Peale journeyed to London, hoping that Moore's connections could get him instruction in the parting process. Although he visited the Royal Mint, he found officials there unhelpful and unwilling to teach him. In England, Peale studied the method of assaying via the humid process at Percival N. Johnson's refinery, and in 1835 introduced it to the Philadelphia Mint, replacing assaying by cupellation. Peale wrote that he "cannot speak in too high terms of Mr. Percival Johnson ... I have derived much useful information in his refinery particularly his method of separating silver, gold and paladium [palladium] by a shortened process". While in London, Peale ordered a delicate balance scale from his friend, expatriate American Joseph Saxton, and later induced Saxton to return to the United States and work for the Philadelphia Mint.

Peale returned to France where, as the refiners wanted payment for teaching him the French method of parting, he learned it by observing the assayer at the branch mint in Rouen. He was not completely happy with this, as he was not allowed to practice it himself, or to experiment, but felt that he could reproduce what he had seen on his return to Philadelphia. Peale also visited the German mints of Dresden, Stuttgart, and Karlsruhe. In Germany, parting was done in iron vessels; although Peale noted these were cheaper than platinum ones, he preferred the latter, writing in December 1834 that use of iron "sometimes leads to losses that are embarrassing." He also visited Freiberg, in Saxony, observing the smelting and refining of lead ore.

=== Return and results ===
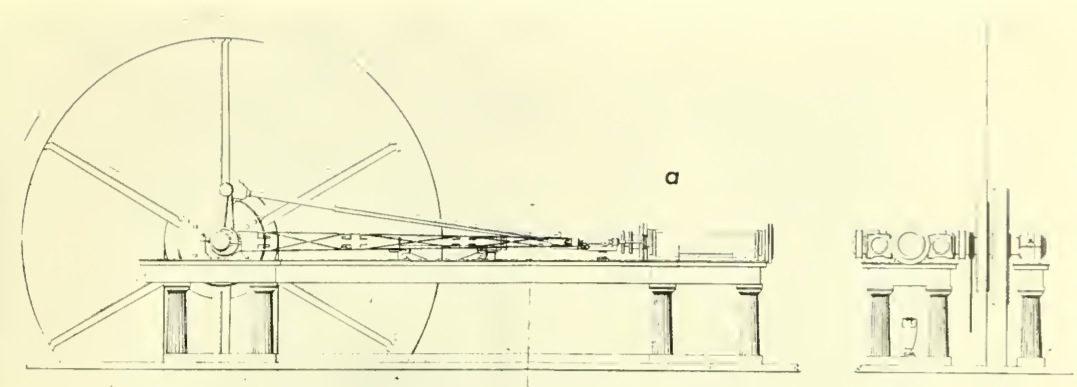
Peale's sketch of the steam engine he designed for the Philadelphia Mint

On June 17, 1835, Peale submitted his report to Moore, 276 pages of his observations at the various European mints he had visited, and his comments and recommendations. He warned, "in the organization of Mints in both France and England that there are offices and incumbents, that are useless, and who render no services of importance for their appointment". He recommended favorably the French practice of not appointing a coin designer, (Note: At the Philadelphia Mint, coin designs were created by the Engraver, an office sometimes called Chief Engraver. See Burdette 2013b, p. 180) but having competitions judged jointly by Mint officers and by artists. Peale also urged the passage of a single, comprehensive Mint Act, to replace the scattered bits of legislation passed over the years; this was done in 1837. One recommendation submitted by Peale, but not adopted, was to have the Mint set up a guaranty department, to hallmark items made of gold or silver by the private sector as public assurance of their quality, as done by the Goldsmiths Company in London. He also recommended that the Philadelphia Mint strike medals, as did its French counterpart. He suggested that the Mint establish a museum of coins and coining, as the Paris facility had.

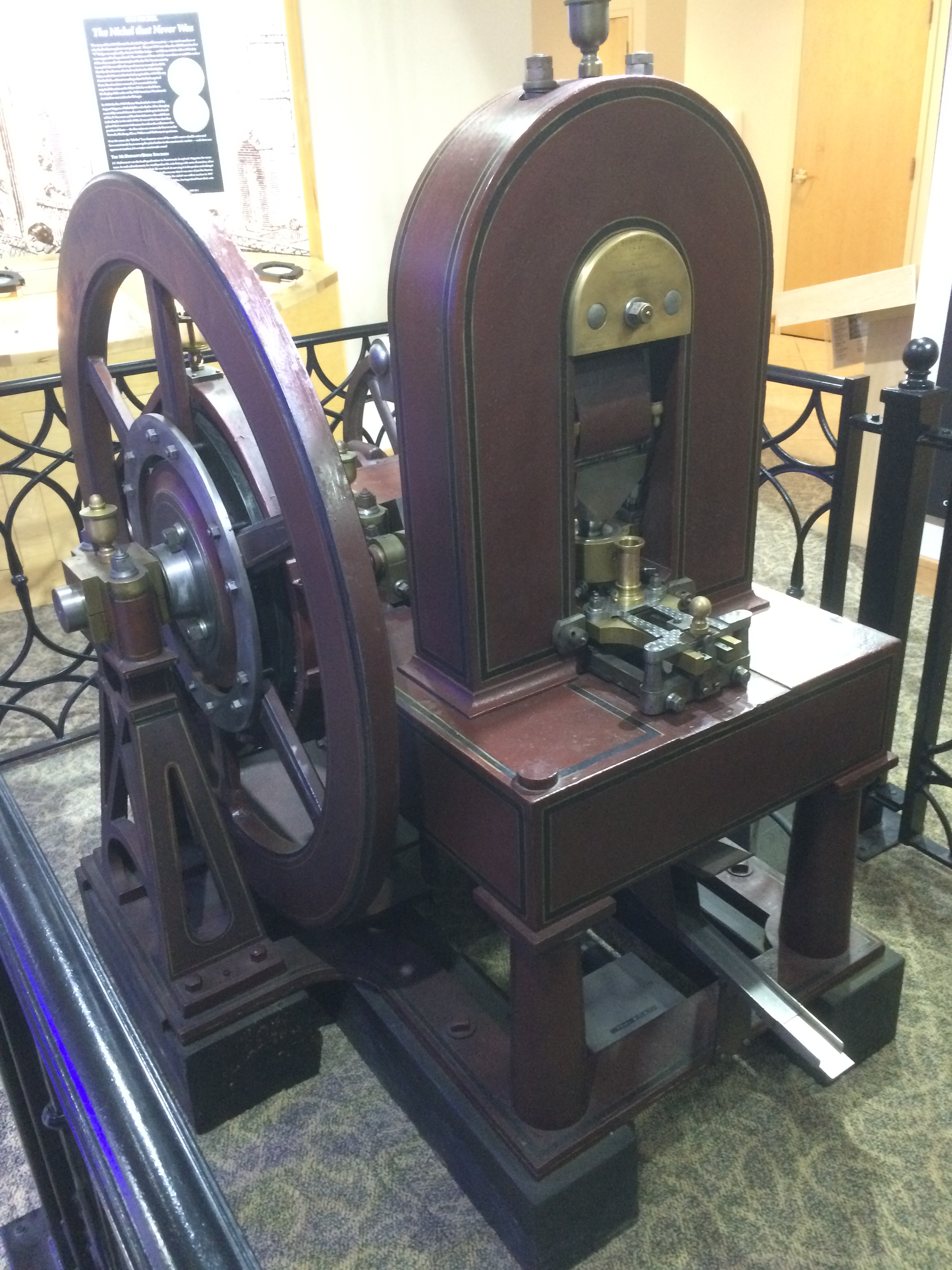
The first steam-powered press at a US mint, designed by Peale (photographed in 2015)

Peale returned from Europe with plans he had drawn for a steam-powered coinage press, borrowing the steam machinery design from English mints and the toggle joint technology from French ones. In September, Patterson, by then Mint Director in place of the retired Moore, wrote to Secretary of the Treasury Levi Woodbury, "we have just completed under the superintendence of Mr. Peale, a model of a coining press from plans which he saw in successful operation in France and in Germany, and possessing many very manifest advantages over the Screw press now applied at the Mint. Among these one of the most important is that [it] admits the immediate and easy application of steam power." Director Patterson called March 23, 1836 "an epoch in our coinage". To take advantage of the new press's increased production capacity, Peale designed a new machine to cut planchets, or blanks, from metal strips. This machine remained in use, almost unmodified, until 1902.

Another of the steam-powered machines Peale had installed on his return was a milling machine, which was used to "upset" the coin—to form a rim around it. A Contamin portrait lathe was imported from France and installed at the Philadelphia Mint in 1837. Prior to this time, all coin dies for American coins had to be made individually, by hand at Philadelphia. Once the lathe was installed, they could be reproduced mechanically by the pantograph-like device.

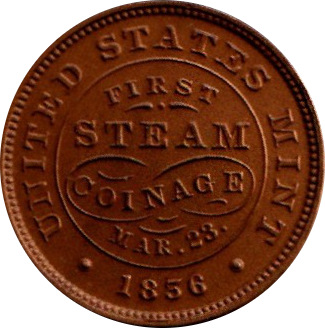
Medal struck for the first US steam coinage, 1836. Designed by Christian Gobrecht.

The first pieces produced by steam power at the Philadelphia Mint, commemorative medals, were struck on March 23, 1836. The first steam press there then began minting cents, with silver and gold coinage first struck there by steam towards the end of the year. Built by the Philadelphia firm of Merrick, Agnew, and Taylor to Peale's design, the press was able to coin 100 pieces per minute. After being retired from government service, the press was used at The Franklin Institute to strike miniature medals for many years, and in 2000 was moved to the American Numismatic Association's Money Museum in Colorado Springs. Patterson wrote,

The performance of the press, in which the power of the lever is substituted for that of the screw, has answered all our expectations. Since that time, all the copper coins have been struck by this press, and it has been lately used with success for coining half dollars. The workmen are now engaged in making other steam presses; and as these are completed, the coining by human labor be abandoned, and the work that can be executed in ... the Mint will be greatly increased.

Numismatist Roger Burdette notes, "in most respects, Peale seems to have selected the best from European examples, and discarded all unnecessary complexity and ineffective motion." Although minor improvements were made from time to time, these machines struck the nation's coinage for the remainder of Peale's life.

According to numismatist David Lange, "the fact-finding journey of [future] Philadelphia Mint Melter and Refiner Franklin Peale through the mints of Europe from 1833 to 1835 assured that United States coins would be second to none in terms of technology." Lange, in his history of the Mint, notes that though Peale ended his career by being fired amid accusations of impropriety, upon his return from Europe, "he was the bearer of many innovations devised in the mints of Europe and now made available to the United States Mint at Philadelphia". Robert Patterson III, son of the Mint Director under whom Peale served for many years, wrote that through Peale's report, "our Mint was placed in full possession of all that was then worthy to be known" from foreign mints and refineries. Patterson indicated that he had often thought, as he passed through the Philadelphia Mint's coining department, that a plaque should be set up to Peale reproducing the tribute to Sir Christopher Wren in London's St. Paul's Cathedral, Si Monumentum Requiris, Circumspice (if you seek his monument, look around you).

=== Melter and Refiner ===
Joseph Cloud had held the position of Melter and Refiner of the Philadelphia Mint since 1797. The Washington administration appointee resigned, effective at the start of 1836. Peale was nominated as Cloud's replacement by President Andrew Jackson on December 21, 1835, and was confirmed by the Senate on January 5, 1836.

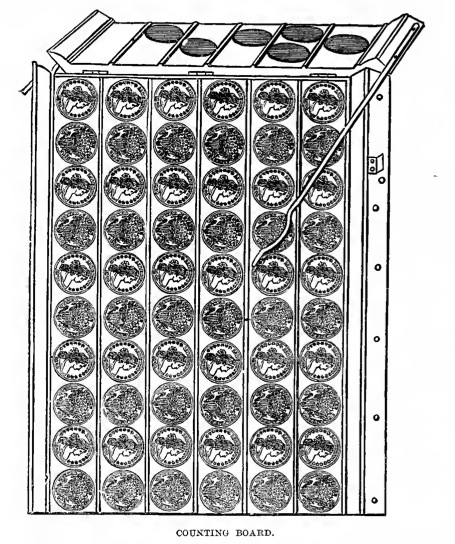
A Philadelphia Mint counting board, invented by Peale

On taking office as Melter and Refiner, Peale implemented the changes he had recommended based on what he had seen in Europe. He also wanted additional mechanization in the mint's Coining Department, headed by Chief Coiner Adam Eckfeldt, whose son Jacob was the Philadelphia Mint's Assayer. Adam Eckfeldt had helped strike some of the first federal coins in 1792 and had been in his office since 1814. Eckfeldt was reluctant to adopt all Peale's recommendations, telling Peale's nephew, engineer George Sellers, "If Mr. Peale had full swing he would turn everything upside down ... he wants something better and no doubt he would have it if we were starting anew." As improvements crept in despite Eckfeldt's caution, the Chief Coiner saw their value and became more enthusiastic, noting the savings in working time afforded by the Contamin lathe, which had been imported from France after being seen by Peale there. To help deal with the increased output from the Philadelphia Mint, Peale invented a piling-box, allowing planchets or coins to be quickly stacked, and a counting board, speeding the work of the clerks. The counting board remained in use until the mints installed mechanical counters in 1934.

One of the innovations that Peale introduced as Melter and Refiner was the use of salt in parting, using it to recover the silver dissolved in nitric acid when gold bullion was being purified. Previously, this could only be done by using copper, a process that generated dangerous and offensive fumes. Table salt (sodium chloride), dissolved in nitric acid, caused silver chloride to precipitate, which could be recovered as metallic silver through the use of zinc and sulfuric acid. This was a further refinement of the parting process; the director of the Monnaie de Paris, Joseph Louis Gay-Lussac, had first used a salt solution as an easy, accurate means of assaying silver. A Senate report in 1873 stated that Peale's advancement of this process "attests to his genius, enterprise, and high attainments". When there were calls in Congress in 1836 for a two-cent piece to be made of debased silver, or billon, Patterson had Peale, working with Second Engraver Christian Gobrecht, (Note: Hired because the Mint's Engraver, William Kneass, had been partially disabled by a stroke. As Gobrecht was a prominent craftsman, he would not accept the usual title of "Assistant Engraver". Gobrecht would become Engraver after Kneass's death in 1840. See Taxay, pp. 170–171, 176, 204.) strike pattern coins to show that the coins would be easily counterfeited using base metals.

In 1835, Congress had authorized branch mints at Charlotte, North Carolina, Dahlonega, Georgia, and New Orleans, Louisiana, to strike into American coin the gold being mined in or entering the country through the South. Despite the rich gold deposits nearby, both Charlotte and Dahlonega were in areas lacking men with technical training; accordingly trained personnel would have to be sent from Philadelphia. New buildings were to be constructed. In August 1837, Mint Director Patterson received word of problems at both sites, including a partial collapse of the Dahlonega building. He wrote to Treasury Secretary Levi Woodbury, proposing "to send, to both the Gold mints, (Note: That is, Charlotte and Dahlonega, which were to strike only gold coins. New Orleans was to strike both gold and silver coins.) a confidential & skillful person, who may ... give instructions as to correcting the errors, that have been committed ... I know of no one competent to this task, except our Melter & Refiner, Mr. Peale." Woodbury agreed, informing Patterson, "you are authorized to send Mr. Peak. [sic]"

Peale, accompanied by his daughter Anna, arrived in Charlotte on September 23, 1837. He found that necessary equipment had not yet arrived, and without it he could do little. Peale ordered a search made, and reported to Patterson that he was "in a trap" in "this fag end of creation" in a town where "the only active beings are the hogs". Peale spent time visiting the mines on which the Charlotte Mint would rely for bullion. He proposed to Patterson that he continue to New Orleans after Dahlonega, to which the Mint Director replied that he would "exercise my veto upon your proposed long delay" and "your presence [in Philadelphia] cannot be dispensed with". On October 27, much of the missing equipment arrived in Charlotte, and Peale was able to complete his mission there and leave for Dahlonega on November 10. Following a difficult journey over primitive mountain roads, Franklin and Anna Peale arrived there on November 15. After assessing the problems at the nascent Dahlonega Mint, Peale reported to Patterson,

The workmanship of the Mint edifice is abominable, a letter might be three times filled with the details of errors and intentional mal construction, the first and greatest of which might be traced to Philada, in ordering a brick building in a country where there is no clay, the material employed for the brick making being the red soil of the Gold region, a decomposed granite ... put into brick by men who certainly deserve diplomas for Botching.

Nevertheless, Peale recommended that construction on the building continue, as he deemed Congress unlikely to pass another appropriation for construction. The Peales left Dahlonega at the end of November. On their way north, Anna was slightly injured when the train in which they were riding through Virginia derailed. Peale was back at his desk at the Philadelphia Mint on December 23, 1837.

Roger Burdette discusses the influence Peale had on the Mint in the 1830s:

In mid-1835 we find Philadelphia engineer/machinist Benjamin Franklin Peale discarding most of the complexity and tradition attendant to press design work of Thonnelier in Paris, Uhlhorn in Karlsruhe, and Boulton in London. Peale went to basic principles of equipment used at these great mints, and adapted it to the American model of efficiency. Equipment had to be robust and easy to repair. The vast distances of North America made it impossible to have mechanical experts at each mint, sitting, waiting for something to break ... The Mint Bureau of 1839 had to insist on similar ways of processing gold and silver [at the four mints], even if these processes were not the most efficient or inexpensive. As with equipment, we can again see Franklin Peale borrowing from the Royal Mint and Paris Mint such production methods that worked well, and discarding those of questionable utility in the American mints.

=== Chief Coiner ===
==== Appointment and early years ====
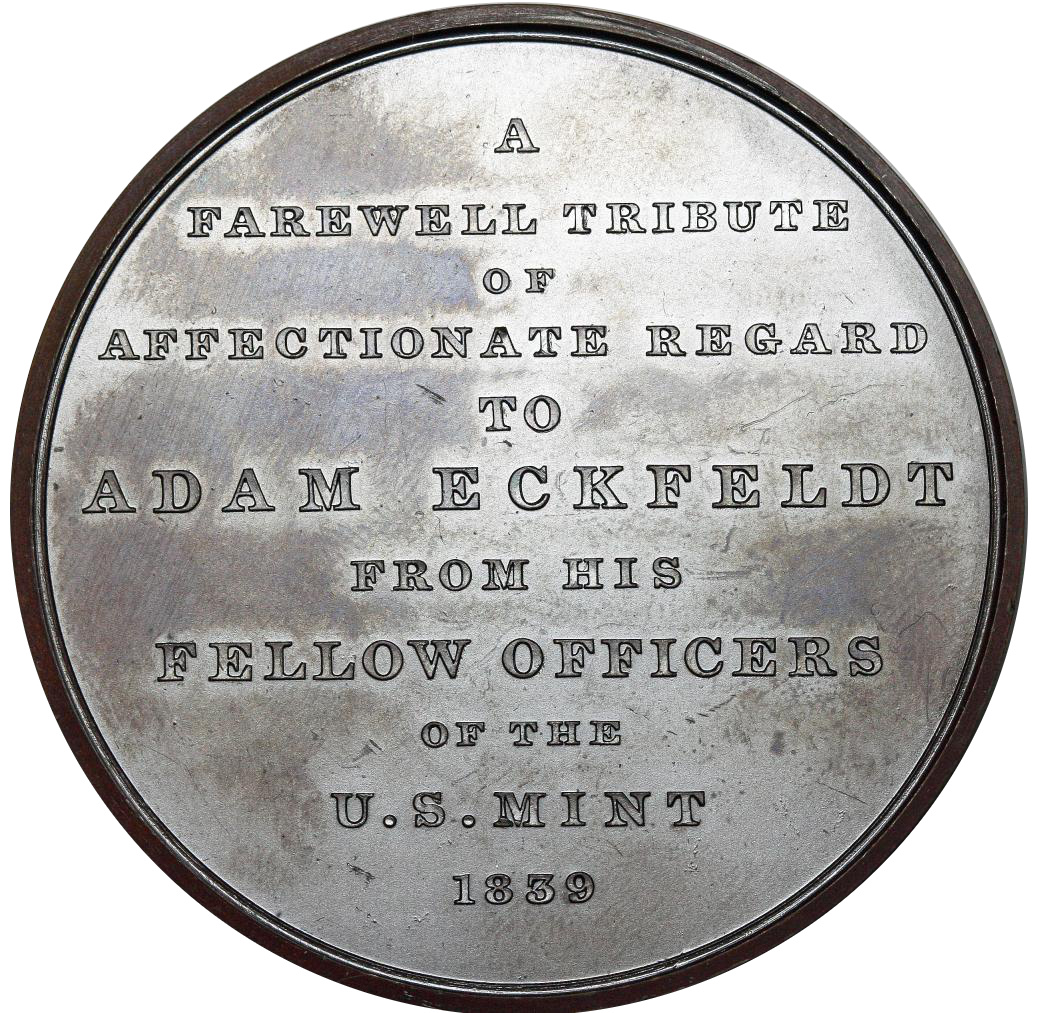
Reverse of Adam Eckfeldt retirement medal, attributed to Peale or to Moritz Fuerst

When Adam Eckfeldt retired in 1839, he recommended Peale as his successor. As the Senate was not sitting, Peale was given a recess appointment as Chief Coiner of the Philadelphia Mint by President Martin Van Buren on March 27, 1839. On January 23, 1840, after the Senate reconvened, Van Buren nominated Peale; the Senate gave its approval on February 17. Despite his retirement, Eckfeldt continued to come to the mint every day until shortly before his death in February 1852, performing the function of Chief Coiner and leaving Peale with time on his hands.

Soon after his appointment, Peale began to engage in a private business on the Mint's premises. He did this by designing, striking and selling medals for private commission, using government property and labor, and the Philadelphia Mint's facilities. Peale's enterprise was very profitable, as his expenses were minimal. This activity took place with the knowledge of the other officers of the Philadelphia Mint, most of whom were Peale's friends and relatives. Clients included corporations as well as one couple celebrating a 50th wedding anniversary. According to Robert E. Wright in his history of Philadelphia as an early financial center, the legality of Peale's business was unclear, (Note: The Coinage Act of 1873, passed after Peale's death, authorized the Chief Coiner to strike medals, provided "that such work shall not interfere with the regular coinage operations, and that no private medal die shall be prepared at said mint, or the machinery or apparatus thereof be used for that purpose". See Watson, p. 31.) but "the uncertainty of the situation made it almost inevitable that someone would make a stink on [Philadelphia's] Chestnut Street."

This activity has been variously characterized by numismatic writers. According to coin dealer and numismatic author Q. David Bowers, "Peale started to abuse his position and privileges, in effect stealing services from the government". Burdette notes, "Overall, it appears that Peale used mint equipment and employees to make medals as instructed by Congress and the mint director, and to produce copies from private and official dies for sale to anyone who was interested. In the case of private sales, Peale seems to have used government metal, then reimbursed the bullion accounts when he collected for the medal. Profits were not accounted for in mint ledgers and it is unknown how much went to Peale, others at the mint or into the mint's Cabinet of Coins. The total amount was probably not large."

After scalemaker Saxton left the Mint Service in 1844, much of the work of maintaining and modifying the sensitive balances for which Saxton was responsible fell to Peale. The Chief Coiner made a number of improvements to the scales, which he wrote up for an article in the Journal of The Franklin Institute in 1847. These balances, sensitive to .0001 troy ounces (0.00011 oz; 0.0031 g), were protected by plate glass from air currents and dust.

==== Conflict with Longacre ====
In 1844, Engraver Gobrecht died, and was replaced by James B. Longacre. The new incumbent had obtained his appointment through the influence of South Carolina Senator John C. Calhoun. He had no relationship to the families that dominated the Philadelphia Mint, such as the Pattersons and Eckfeldts, and the connection with the Southerner Calhoun was objectionable to Peale, Patterson, and their associates. They would have preferred no replacement for Gobrecht, with the New York engraver Charles Cushing White or others they knew and trusted brought in on contract as necessary. This would ensure Peale's highly profitable medal business was not threatened. Additionally, Longacre had no training, prior to his appointment, in coin or medal design, being a successful plate engraver, and Lange states that the Mint officers were "understandably" prejudiced against him.

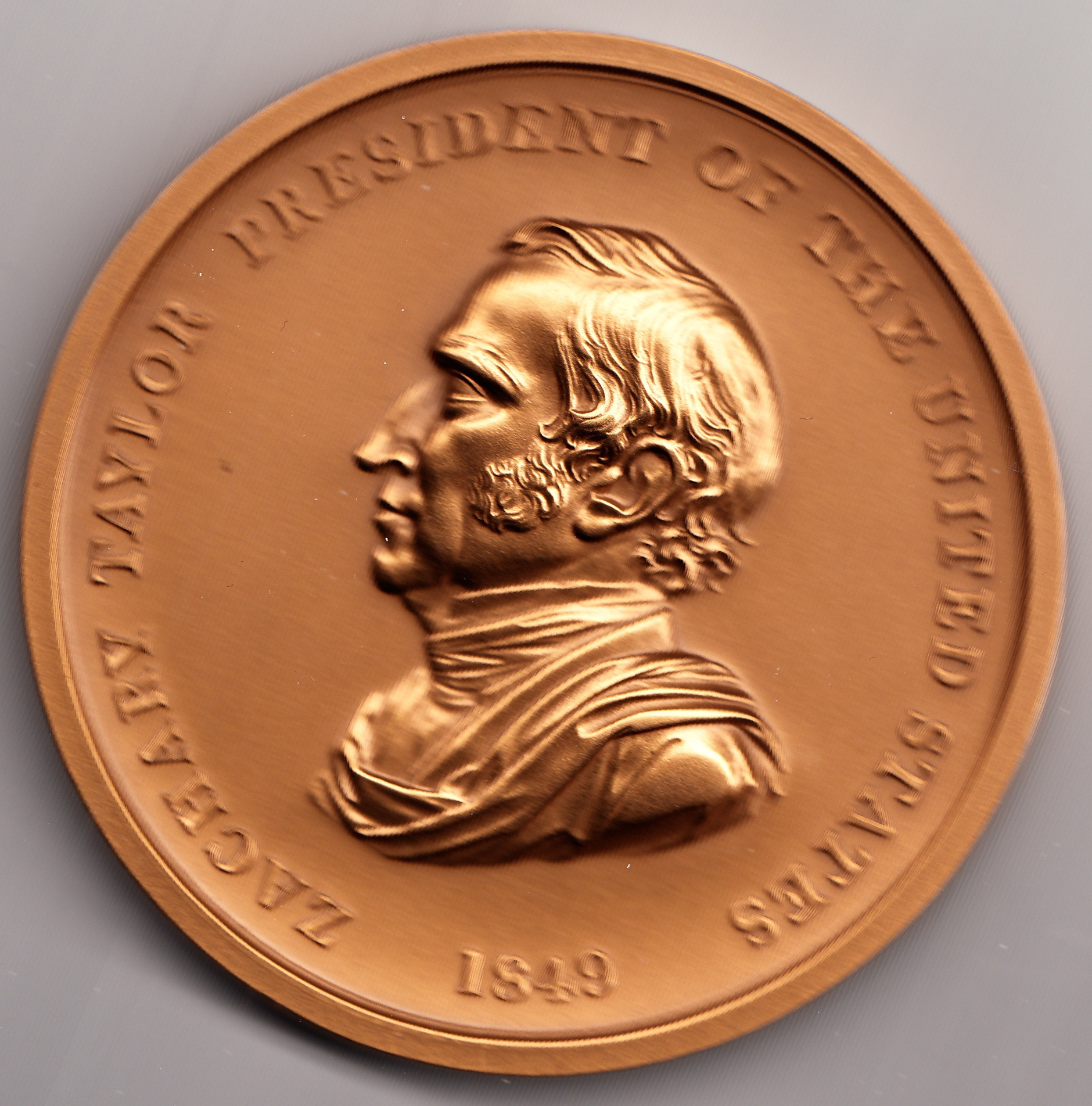
Peale designed the Indian Peace Medal for President Zachary Taylor in 1849.

Peale sometimes worked on medals for the government, taking care to exclude Longacre from the process. During the Mexican–American War, Congress voted a gold medal to Major General Zachary Taylor for his victories at Palo Alto and Resaca de la Palma. Peale engraved the design from a portrait by William Carl Brown and a model by John T. Battin. After Taylor became president, Peale designed his Indian Peace Medal; Peale also engraved Indian Peace Medals for presidents John Tyler and James Polk, working from designs or models by other men. In 1846, Peale designed and engraved the Coast Survey Medal (also called the George M. Bache medal). Peale believed that all national commemorative medals, those authorized by Congress, should have their dies lodged at the Philadelphia Mint, and be struck there, and with Patterson's support urged the issuance of medals for presidents for whom no Indian Peace Medal had been designed, such as John Adams and William Henry Harrison. This was done, but not in Peale's time—for example, the William Henry Harrison medal was designed by later Assistant and Chief Engraver George T. Morgan. These works, like Peale's Indian Peace Medals, form part of the Mint's Presidential series, which continues to the present day.

Peale's improvements had made it possible for dies to be reproduced mechanically, relieving the Mint's Engraver of much of his routine duties. In the absence of a need for new designs or denominations, Longacre had little to do but add the dates to dies. Some of these insertions were blundered, and modern-day numismatic scholars, such as R. W. Julian, have wondered if, as Peale and those who worked under him also sometimes inserted dates into dies, these mistakes were done intentionally in an attempt to bring discredit on Longacre. Nevertheless, Longacre's first few years at the Philadelphia Mint passed without serious conflict with Peale. All this changed in 1849, when Congress authorized a gold dollar and a double eagle ($20 piece). This made Longacre the center of attention at the mint, as he would be responsible for producing the new designs and dies. It also brought him into direct conflict with Peale: the Engraver would need to use the Contamin lathe, which was necessary to Peale's medal business. Peale sought to sabotage Longacre's attempts, with the goal of having him dismissed, and such work contracted for outside the government, allowing the medal business to continue undisturbed. In this, Peale had the support of Director Patterson.

As Longacre worked to complete the two new coins, he had to deal with interference from Peale. In early 1849, according to a letter written by Longacre the following year, the Engraver was approached by a member of the Mint staff, warning him that another officer (plainly Peale) sought to have the engraving work done outside the Mint, making Longacre redundant. Longacre's response to the information was to spend much of March 1849 preparing the dies for the gold dollar, at some cost to his health, as he later related. Longacre proceeded with work on the double eagle through late 1849, and described the obstacles set in his path by Peale:

The plan of operation selected for me was to have an electrotype mould made from my model, in copper, to serve as a pattern for a cast in iron. The operations of the galvanic battery for this purpose were conducted in the apartments of the chief coiner. The galvanic process failed, my model was destroyed in the operation. I had, however, taken the precaution to make a cast in plaster ... From this cast, as the only alternative, I procurred [sic] a metallic one which, however, was not perfect; but I thought I should be able to correct the imperfections in the engraving of the die ... this was a laborious task, but seasonably completed, entirely by my own hand. The die then had to be hardened in the coining department; it unluckily split in the process.

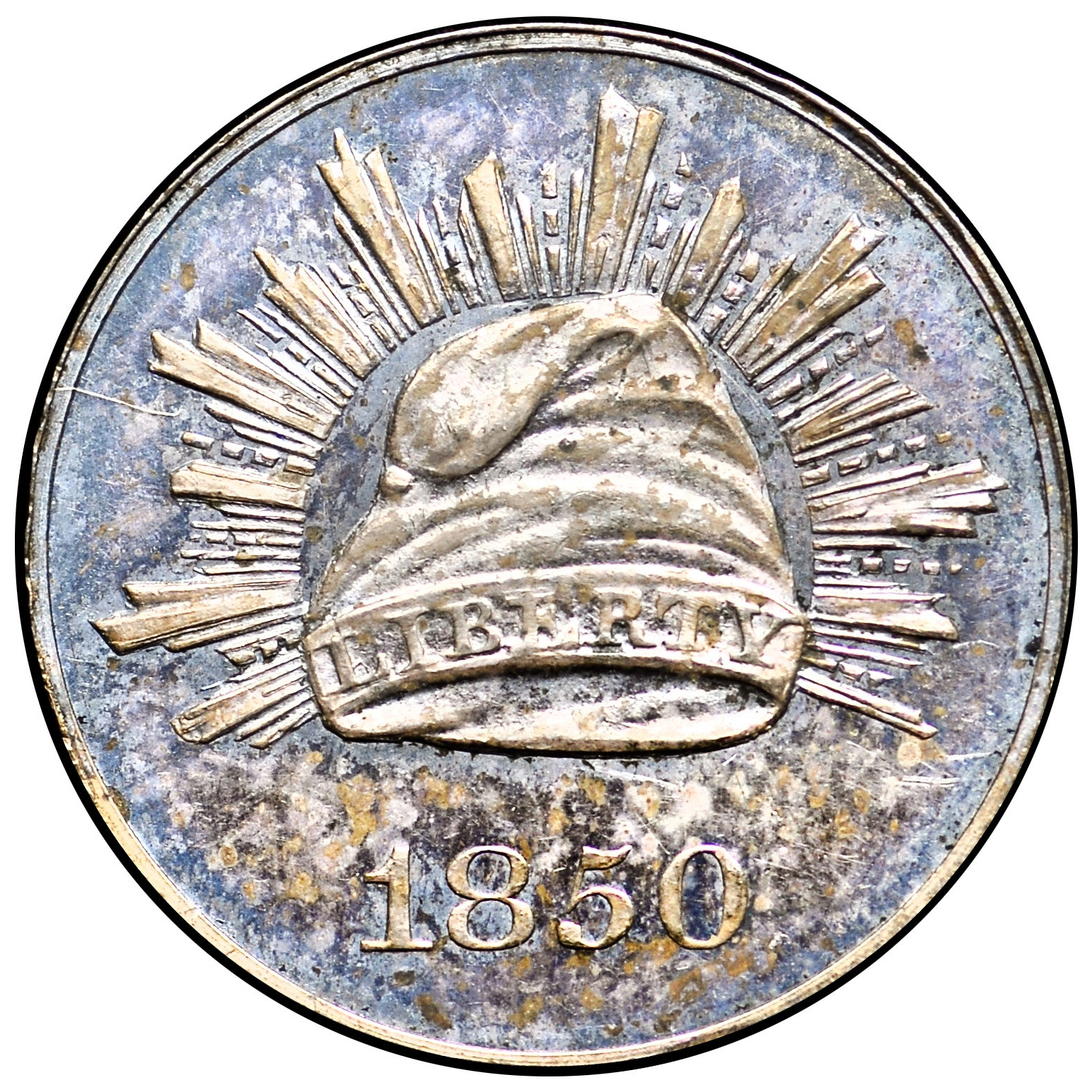
Pattern coin struck to Peale's design for the three-cent piece in silver

According to numismatic historian Don Taxay, "under the circumstances, Peale's adoption of a process not normally used at the Mint, together with its catastrophic failure, seems more than coincidental." When Longacre completed the double eagle dies, they were rejected by Peale, who stated that the design was engraved too deeply to fully impress the coin, and the pieces would not stack properly. Taxay, however, noted that the one surviving 1849 double eagle displays no such problems, and by appearance would be level in a stack. Peale complained to Patterson, who wrote to Treasury Secretary William M. Meredith asking for Longacre's removal on December 25, 1849, on the ground he could not make proper dies. Meredith was apparently willing to have Longacre fired, but relented after the Engraver journeyed to Washington and met with him personally.

Beginning in 1849, there were calls for a silver three-cent piece, and pattern coins were struck at the Philadelphia Mint. Longacre's design featured a shield within a six-pointed star on one side. Peale offered a competing design, showing a Liberty cap, very similar to one Gobrecht had made in 1836 when a gold dollar had been proposed. Patterson preferred Peale's design, but reluctantly endorsed Longacre's, since it was in lower relief and could be struck more easily, and Treasury Secretary Thomas Corwin approved the Engraver's work. The three-cent piece went into circulation in 1851.

In 1850, with the Mint faced with a vast increase in gold deposits due to the California Gold Rush, Peale suggested that the Mint hire women to supplement the staff assigned to weigh and adjust gold planchets, or coin blanks, describing the work as "being entirely suited to their capacity". The Mint did hire 40 women, who were (as of 1860) paid $1.10 per ten-hour day, a sum considered generous. The Mint's hiring of women was the first time the American government had employed women to fill specific jobs at regular wages.

In 1851, Peale designed a new steam engine for the Philadelphia Mint, using a "steeple" design without exterior pipes. Although designed to generate 100 horsepower, wear soon reduced its capacity. American journals of engineering mentioned Peale's latest work without comment; British journals pointed out the defects and suggested that time had passed Peale by.

==== Downfall ====
Not all of Peale's innovations were successful. He caused the Mint to purchase a large lathe for turning heavy metal rolls, which cost the government at least $2,000 and that Peale conceded had never worked and likely never would. He bought from his nephew, George Sellers, a set of molds for casting ingots and accompanying equipment, which proved unusable as they were not adapted to the Mint's machinery. A drawbench made by Peale at the cost of at least $1,500 proved dangerous as the piston would drive with tremendous force against the end of its cylinder, causing a concussion and endangering those nearby. "Peale's machine gun" was put aside by Mint staff as useless soon after its introduction. An 1853 attempt by Peale to convert the Philadelphia Mint's wood-burning annealing furnaces to use anthracite coal destroyed the furnaces, cost the government several thousand dollars, and led to Peale being ordered to undertake no more such projects. One invention that worked well was the "noisy sofa"—sitting on it set off a trumpet blast. Constructed at the cost of about $200 in government funds, it graced in turn the offices of Peale and Patterson.

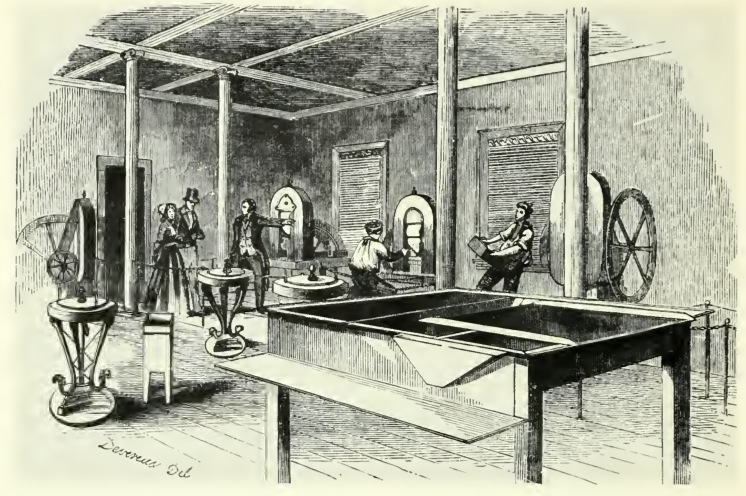
The pressing and milling room of the Philadelphia Mint, 1852

These activities were financed through a provision of the Mint Act of 1837 that Patterson interpreted to allow the Mint to decline to give credit for small amounts of silver in gold deposits. This practice was twice approved by the then-Secretary of the Treasury, in 1837 and 1849. Small deposits of bullion were rounded down to be divisible by $5, with the surplus kept and used at the discretion of Mint officials. This, and similar practices whereby officials financed activities without an appropriation from Congress, were brought to an end after Peale proposed a $20,800 renovation of part of the Philadelphia Mint building in 1850, and ran over budget by $12,000. To pay this, Patterson used the profits, or seignorage, projected to be made from the new three-cent pieces. When Congress heard of this, it passed the Act of February 21, 1853, requiring the Mint Director to regularly pay the seignorage into the Treasury.

One flaw in Peale's medal business was his need to acquire gold and silver bullion within the Mint. This was paid for once the medal sold, and there was no problem while the Melter and Refiner of the Philadelphia Mint was Peale's friend Jonas R. McClintock. But in 1846, McClintock resigned and was replaced by Richard Sears McCulloh. At first, McCulloh gave Peale whatever gold and silver he needed without question, but came to object to doing so. Peale and McCulloh made a deal whereby the struck medal would remain in McCulloh's custody until Peale had replaced the bullion, but Peale objected that the procedure was "inconvenient". Beginning in August 1849, McCulloh refused further requests from Peale for bullion, and Peale instead gained it from the Mint's Treasurer.

Peale did his best to make McCulloh's position difficult, such as refusing to accept bullion for coins except from McCulloh personally. In 1850, McCulloh resigned. In November of that year, the former official published an article in the New York Evening Express alleging that those employed at the Mint had transformed "it into a workshop for their gain". President Millard Fillmore sent the article to Secretary of the Treasury Corwin for an explanation; Corwin forwarded it to Patterson, who confirmed that Peale was running a private medal business on the premises, but stated that there was no interference with the performance of Peale's duties as Chief Coiner. Taxay noted that this was only true because the retired Adam Eckfeldt was still performing the duties of that office without salary, and this ceased in February 1852 when Eckfeldt died after a brief illness. The death of his predecessor caused Peale to write "a frantic letter" to the new Mint Director (Patterson had retired), George N. Eckert, stating that he urgently needed an assistant.

McCulloh's campaign had continued; on August 1, 1851, he wrote directly to President Fillmore, accusing Peale of "lavish and unnecessary expenditure of public money", and stating that Peale was unfit to hold office. He alleged that Mint workmen had been detailed to make repairs to Peale's house while being paid for their time by the government. One man subsequently stated that he and another Mint employee spent two days working on Peale's house; another alleged that whenever the archery club of which Peale was a member met, Mint employees were sent to help with the arrangements. McCulloh also accused Peale of having Mint workers make furniture for his use when they would otherwise be idle. Corwin ordered an investigation, which dragged on for the next year and a half. Peale entered a statement in April 1852, alleging that McCulloh was accusing the Director and the accounting staff of "gross neglect of duty", and that McCulloh's attack on Peale's medal business was a slight on "the late venerable and much loved Adam Eckfeldt", whose precedent Peale stated he was following. Peale wrote in his defense, "I boldly claim to have done for the Mint and my country, much that will entitle me gratitude."

Eckert was friendly towards Peale, and worked to discredit the accusations. McCulloh urged Corwin to review the correspondence himself, and the Secretary agreed, but both Corwin and Eckert left office in early 1853 with no action having been taken against Peale. McCulloh that summer published a pamphlet, The Proceedings of the Late Director of the Mint in Relation to the Official Misconduct of Franklin Peale Esq., Chief Coiner and Other Abuses in the Mint, printing much of the correspondence. This tract was reviewed by the new Mint Director, James Ross Snowden; he and the new Treasury Secretary, James Guthrie, decided to forbid private enterprises on the Mint's property. In August 1854, Guthrie issued regulations banning the practice.

Taxay recorded that the new policy "seem[s] to have been ill-received in certain quarters of the Mint" but that as not all records are extant, the specifics are uncertain. According to Taxay,

It is clear, however, that Snowden wrote to Guthrie preferring charges against Peale, and that Guthrie in turn wrote to the President [Franklin Pierce] who, having no one else to write to, dismissed Peale at once ... Peale left the Mint on December 2, [1854,] never again to return.

The reasons for Peale's firing were not publicly announced, and his friends and allies, such as William DuBois (Adam Eckfeldt's son-in-law and the Assistant Assayer (later Assayer) of the Philadelphia Mint) stated that it was so President Pierce could have the position to fill from the Democratic Party. Taxay noted that this explanation ignored the fact that Martin Van Buren, under whose administration Peale had been appointed Chief Coiner, was also a Democrat as president. Nevertheless, an 1873 Senate report on Peale's request for compensation after being dismissed stated, "why such a valuable officer was displaced does not appear".

== Later years, death, and assessment ==
After his departure from the Philadelphia Mint, Peale initially retired from all employment. In 1864, he returned to the private sector as president of the Hazelton Coal and Rail Road Company, in which he had long been involved, remaining in that position through 1867. Civic organizations of which he was president included the Musical Fund Society of Pennsylvania and the Institution for Instruction to the Blind. He had been elected a manager of the latter organization in 1839, served on many important committees, and was elected its president in 1863, still holding the office at his death in 1870. A member of the American Philosophical Society since 1833, he served as one of its curators from 1838 to 1845 and from 1847 until 1870. A longtime member of the Pennsylvania Academy of Fine Arts, which his father had helped to found, he served as one of its directors through much of his retirement. He was elected a member of the American Antiquarian Society in 1865.

In his later years, Peale spent some of his autumns at the Delaware Water Gap north of Philadelphia, searching for Stone Age artifacts and amassing a major collection. Peale catalogued his finds and added narrative descriptions, bequeathing the collection to the American Philosophical Society. An adept archer, he helped found the United Bowmen club, members of whom carried his casket to his grave, at his instructions. He was also, at his death, president of the Skater's Club. He was a lifelong skater, and developed a method for extracting a skater who broke through the ice that saved many lives.

Peale was among those consulted in 1870 by Treasury Secretary George Boutwell in preparing the legislation to reform the Mint that became the Coinage Act of 1873. Peale advocated for the office of the Mint Director to be moved from Philadelphia to Washington; this was enacted. He supported the abolition of the gold dollar and the three-dollar piece, but these coins were not ended by Congress until 1890. He denigrated recent coin issues (many designed by Longacre, who had died in 1869), saying that their designs have, "hitherto been lamentably, if not disgracefully deficient".

Peale married twice; his first marriage to Eliza Greatrake, contracted in 1815 while he was still a minor, produced one daughter, Anna, who survived him. His second, childless, marriage was to Caroline Girard Haslam, a widow, and the niece of the wealthy Stephen Girard; it lasted from 1839 to his death. He enjoyed the company of children, making toys by his own hand for them. Peale was in declining health in his final months, but was still able to continue his activities, and only a short illness preceded his death at his home at 1131 Girard Street in Philadelphia, on May 5, 1870. His final words were, "If this is death, it is as I wished, perfect peace, perfect comfort, perfect joy."

Mint Director Henry Linderman stated in 1873 of Peale, "Although Mr. Peale undoubtedly received the cooperation of [Patterson and others], the inventions and improvements were peculiarly Mr. Peale's. I have no doubt whatever on that point. They were of almost incalculable value to the public service." George G. Evans, in his late 19th century history of the Mint, described Peale, "his mildness, integrity, gentlemanly bearing and high moral and mental culture constituted him a model officer". Walter Breen deemed Peale, "brilliant but unscrupulous". Burdette writes of Peale and his effect on the Mint, "during the generation from about 1830 to 1855, the greatest influence to operations and production came from one man: Benjamin Franklin Peale. He was the consummate 'machinist' of the day at a time when this term encompassed imaginative design, planning, construction and improvement of working processes ... While he had the complete support of mint directors Moore and Patterson, he was also held in high esteem by the common mint workers and Philadelphia's scientific elite. Results of many of his ideas lasted a century or more, until growth in population made nineteenth century engineering insufficient for modern coinage needs." According to Bowers, "today Peale is one of several Mint people who can be viewed from many different angles, each perspective sometimes leading certain writers to draw widely differing conclusions."

After his dismissal, Peale petitioned Congress for $30,000 as payment for improvements and inventions he had made for the government. The Senate twice, in 1858 and 1860, passed legislation to pay Peale $10,000, but the House of Representatives declined to vote on it. In 1870, it was introduced in the Senate again, but did not pass. Legislation to compensate Peale in the amount of $10,000 was enacted on March 3, 1873, after his death—the act was, according to its title, in relief of Anna E. Peale, Franklin Peale's daughter. The following month, Caroline Peale, Franklin's widow, gave the Mint a marble bust of her late husband, "to be set upon a pedestal, in some position, where it may be open to the inspection of visitors and preserve his memory to future generations." Taxay, writing in 1966, stated that he had been unable to ascertain the bust's whereabouts.

== References and sources ==
Notes

Sources

- American Philosophical Society (1886). Laws and Regulations of the American Philosophical Society. Philadelphia: Press of McCalla & Stavely. OCLC 11529086.
- Bowers, Q. David (2001). The Harry W. Bass, Jr. Museum Sylloge. Dallas, TX: Harry W. Bass, Jr. Foundation. ISBN 0-943161-88-6.
- Bowers, Q. David (2004). A Guide Book of Double Eagle Gold Coins. Atlanta, GA: Whitman Publishing. ISBN 978-0-7948-1784-8.
- Bowers, Q. David (2006). A Guide Book of Shield and Liberty Head Nickels. Atlanta, GA: Whitman Publishing. ISBN 0-7948-1921-4.
- Breen, Walter (1988). Walter Breen's Complete Encyclopedia of U.S. and Colonial Coins. New York: Doubleday. ISBN 978-0-385-14207-6.
- Burdette, Roger (Spring 2013). "Benjamin Franklin Peale – Inventions and Innovations for the United States Mint, 1835 to 1852". Journal of Numismatic Research. 1 (2). Great Falls, VA: Seneca Mill Press LLC: 9–133.
- Burdette, Roger (2013). From Mine to Mint. Great Falls, VA: Seneca Mill Press LLC. ISBN 978-0-9768986-7-2.
- Bureau of the Mint (1904). Laws of the United States Relating to the Coinage. Washington, D.C.: United States Government Printing Office.
- Clark, Cathy L. (March 2000). "Steam Power: A Pressing Issue". The Numismatist. Colorado Springs, CO: American Numismatic Association: 287–291.
- Doty, Richard G. (November 4–5, 1989). Metcalf, William E. (ed.). 'An Onerous and Delicate Task': Franklin Peale's Mission South, 1837. America's Gold Coinage. New York: American Numismatic Society. pp. 67–82. ISBN 0-89722-238-5.
- Edson, Edith McLane (October 2001). "Notes and Documents: A James Peale Puzzle: Captain Allen McLane's Encounter with British Dragoons". The Pennsylvania Magazine of History and Biography. 125 (4). Philadelphia: The Historical Society of Pennsylvania: 30–46. JSTOR 20093480.
- Evans, George G. (1890). Illustrated History of the United States Mint (revised ed.). Philadelphia: George G. Evans. OCLC 8390241. OL 24183503M.
- Ferguson, Eugene S. (Winter 1965). "Technical Museums and International Exhibitions". Technology and Culture. 6 (1). Baltimore, MD: The Johns Hopkins University Press: 30–46. doi:10.2307/3100950. JSTOR 3100950. S2CID 111639302.
- Ferguson, Eugene S., ed. (1965). Early Engineering Reminiscences (1815–40) of George Escol Sellers. Washington, D.C.: Smithsonian Institution. OCLC 522166.
- Frazer, Persifor (1908). The Franklin Institute: Its Services and Deserts. Philadelphia: The Franklin Institute. OCLC 45262206.
- Lange, David W. (2006). History of the United States Mint and its Coinage. Atlanta, GA: Whitman Publishing. ISBN 978-0-7948-1972-9.
- Nepomucene, Sister St. John (March 1955). "Franklin Peale's Visit to Europe in the Mint Service". Journal of Chemical Education. 32 (3). New York: American Chemical Society: 155–159. Bibcode:1955JChEd..32..156N. doi:10.1021/ed032p156.
- Patterson III, Robert (December 16, 1870). "An Obituary Notice of Franklin Peale". Proceedings of the American Philosophical Society. 11 (81). Philadelphia: American Philosophical Society: 597–604. JSTOR 981519.
- Pessolano-Filos, Francis (1983). The Venus Numismatics Dictionary of Artists, Designers, Modellers, Engravers, and Die Sinkers Whose Works Were Commissioned by or Struck by the United States Mint 1792–1977. New York: Eros Publishing Company. ISBN 0-911571-00-0.
- Proud, Robert (1903). The Proud Papers. Philadelphia: Stan. V. Henkels (auctioneer). OCLC 5573300.
- Reed, P. Bradley, ed. (1990). Coin World Almanac (6th ed.). Sidney, OH: Amos Press Inc. ISBN 0-88687-460-2.
- Sellers, Charles Coleman (1980). Mr. Peale's Museum: Charles Willson Peale and the First Popular Museum of Natural Science and Art. New York: W.W. Norton & Co. ISBN 978-0-393-05700-3.
- Smith, Pete (August 1994). "Peale Helped Mechanize the Mint". The Numismatist. Colorado Springs, CO: American Numismatic Association.
- Smith, Pete (January 1997). "Adam Eckfeldt Struck the First U.S. Coins". The Numismatist. Colorado Springs, CO: American Numismatic Association.
- Smith, Pete (2010). "American Numismatic Biographies" (PDF). The Numismatic Bibliomania Society. Archived from the original (PDF) on September 7, 2014.
- Snow, Richard (2009). A Guide Book of Flying Eagle and Indian Head Cents. Atlanta. GA: Whitman Publishing. ISBN 978-0-7948-2831-8.
- Taxay, Don (1983). The U.S. Mint and Coinage (reprint of 1966 ed.). New York: Sanford J. Durst Numismatic Publications. ISBN 978-0-915262-68-7.
- United States Senate (1887). Journal of the Executive Proceedings of the Senate of the United States. Vol. IV. Washington, D.C.: United States Government Printing Office.
- United States Senate (1887). Journal of the Executive Proceedings of the Senate of the United States. Vol. V. Washington, D.C.: United States Government Printing Office.
- United States Senate Committee on Claims (February 19, 1873). Report No. 454. Washington, D.C.: United States Government Printing Office.
- Watson, Jesse P. (1926). The Bureau of the Mint: Its History, Activities and Organization. Service Monographs of the United States Government, No. 37. Baltimore: The Johns Hopkins Press. OCLC 4121674.
- Whitehead, James L. (July 1951). "The Mission of Franklin Peale to Europe, 1833 to 1835". Pennsylvania History. 18 (3). University Park, PA: Penn State University Press: 197–212. JSTOR 27769224.
- Wright, Robert E. (2010). The First Wall Street: Chestnut Street, Philadelphia, and the Birth of American Finance. Chicago: University of Chicago Press. ISBN 978-0-226-91029-1.

de Peyster family tree
- Johannes de Peyster Sr. (c. 1600–c. 1685)
  - Abraham de Peyster (1657–1728), Mayor of New York City
    - Catherine de Peyster, married Philip Van Cortlandt, son of Stephanus Van Cortlandt
      - Pierre Van Cortlandt (1721–1814)
    - Abraham de Peyster (1696–1767), Treasurer of the Province of New York, married Margaret Van Cortlandt, daughter of Jacobus Van Cortlandt
      - James Abraham de Peyster (1726–1799)
        - Capt. Abraham de Peyster (1753–1798), married Catherine Livingston, granddaughter of Philip Livingston
        - Frederick de Peyster (1758–1834)
          - James Ferguson de Peyster (1794–1874), married (1) Susan Maria Clarkson (1800–1823), daughter of Matthew Clarkson; married (2) Frances Goodhue Ashton (1805–1871)
            - Susan Maria de Peyster (1823–1910), married Robert Edward Livingston (1820–1889)
              - Goodhue Livingston (1867–1951), an architect, married Louisa Robb (1877–1960), daughter of James Hampden Robb
            - Frederic James de Peyster (1839–1905), lawyer, married Augusta McEvers Morris (1851–1911)
          - Frederic de Peyster (1796–1882), lawyer
            - John Watts de Peyster (1821–1907), military officer, married Estelle Livingston
              - John Watts de Peyster Jr. (1841–1873), Union Army officer
              - Johnston de Peyster (1846–1903), New York State Assembly member
    - Pierre Guillaume de Peyster (b. 1707), married Cornelia Schuyler
      - Arent DePeyster (1736–1822), British military officer
      - Pierre Guillaume de Peyster (1745–1807)
        - William Sheriff de Peyster, married Mary Roosevelt, niece of Nicholas Roosevelt
        - Cornelia de Peyster, married Jacob R. Van Rensselaer
  - Johannes de Peyster (1666–1719), Mayor of New York City, married Anna Bancker, sister of Albany mayor Evert Bancker
    - Johannes de Peyster III (1694–1783), married Anna Schuyler, daughter of Albany mayor Myndert Schuyler
      - Anna de Peyster (1723–1794), who married Albany mayor Volkert P. Douw
    - Maria de Peyster, married Gerard Bancker
      - Gerard Bancker (1740–1799), surveyor and politician
    - William de Peyster, married Margaret Roosevelt
      - William de Peyster
        - Elizabeth de Peyster, married Charles Willson Peale (1741–1827), painter
          - Franklin Peale (1795–1870), Philadelphia Mint officer
          - Titian Peale (1799–1885), naturalist
    - Catharina de Peyster, married Hendrick Rutgers (1712–1779)
      - Henry Rutgers (1745–1830), Revolutionary War hero, namesake of Rutgers University
  - Elizabeth de Peyster, married New Jersey provincial Governor John Hamilton
  - Maria de Peyster, married New York City Mayor David Provost
