= Peale family =

Family of American artists

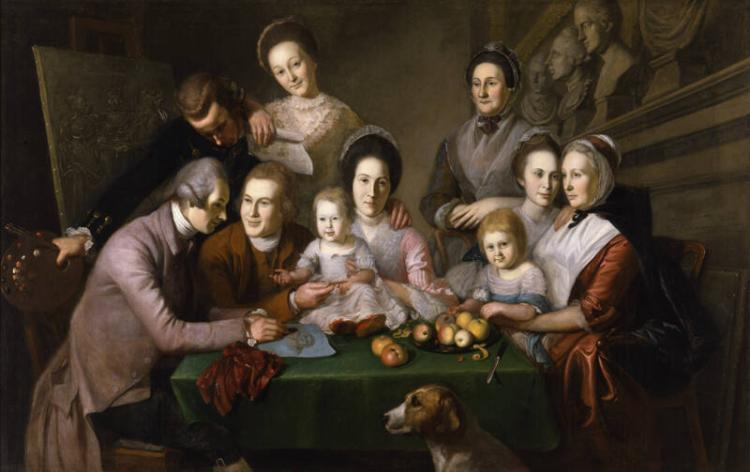
The Peale Family by Charles Willson Peale, c. 1773 – c. 1809

The Peale family were an American family, considered the first family of American artists. Notable members of the family included Charles Willson Peale and his sons Raphaelle, Rembrandt, Rubens and Titian, James Peale, Charles's brother, and his daughters Anna Claypoole, Margaretta, and Sarah Miriam, and Charles Peale Polk, nephew of both men.

== History ==
For one hundred years, from the colonial period to the Gilded Age, members of the Peale family of artists and naturalists figured prominently in the cultural life of the American nation. The Peale Family worked in the urban centers as well as the unsettled areas of the North American continent. In Annapolis and Baltimore, Maryland, Charleston, Williamsburg and Norfolk, Philadelphia, New York City, Boston, Washington, D. C., and St. Louis they left behind a legacy of thousands of works of art.

Wherever they worked or exhibited their paintings, the Peales encouraged a taste for art that contributed to the expansion of artistic interests and patronage in the nineteenth century. Their museums became the model, inspiration, and example for similar institutions throughout the country, and the educational institutions with which they are identified include the Pennsylvania Academy of the Fine Arts and the Academy of Natural Sciences in Philadelphia. For one hundred years, two generations of Peale artists carried on an artistic tradition, producing works in a diversity of genres: portraits in the large and in miniature, history paintings, landscape, and still life.

When Charles Willson Peale died in 1827, the second generation of Peales entered the Victorian period maintaining their dedication to art and nature, but their art became subject to the changes in taste resulting from new artistic developments in the United States and different expectations of the artist. Like many American families after the Civil War, the Peales' large progeny dispersed into the vast American interior and the Peale influence was diffused, unlike the focused impact upon art and history made by the first two generations.

== Family tree ==
- Charles Peale (1709–1750)
  - Charles Willson Peale (1741–1827)
    - Raphaelle Peale (1774–1825)
      - Edmund Peale (1805–1851)
      - Reuben Peale (1808–1891)
        - Edmund Peale (1842–1901)
          - Charles Clifford Peale (1870–1955)
            - Norman Vincent Peale (1898–1993)
    - Rembrandt Peale (1778–1860)
      - Rosalba Carriera Peale (1799–1874)
    - Titian Ramsay Peale (1780–1798)
    - Rubens Peale (1784–1865)
      - Charles Willson Peale (1821–1871)
        - Albert Charles Peale (1849–1914)
      - Mary Jane Peale (1827–1902)
    - Sophonisba Angusciola Peale (1786–1859)
      - George Escol Sellers (1808–1899)
      - Coleman Sellers II (1827–1907)
        - Horace Wells Sellers (1857–1933)
          - Charles Coleman Sellers (1903–1980)
    - Benjamin Franklin Peale (1795–1870)
    - Titian Ramsay Peale (1799–1885)
    - Elizabeth De Peyster Peale (1802–1857)
      - Sophonisba Sellers Patterson (1822–1883)
        - Charles Patterson Hergesheimer (1843–1919)
          - Ella Sophonisba Hergesheimer (1873–1943)
  - Elizabeth Digby Peale (1744–1777)
    - Charles Peale Polk (1767–1822)
  - James Peale (1749–1831)
    - Jane Ramsay Peale
      - Mary Jane Simes (1807–1872)
    - Maria Peale (1787–1866)
    - Anna Claypoole Peale (1791–1878)
    - Margaretta Angelica Peale (1795–1882)
    - Sarah Miriam Peale (1800–1885)
