= Still Life - Balsam Apples and Vegetables =

Painting by James Peale

Still Life: Balsam Apple and Vegetables
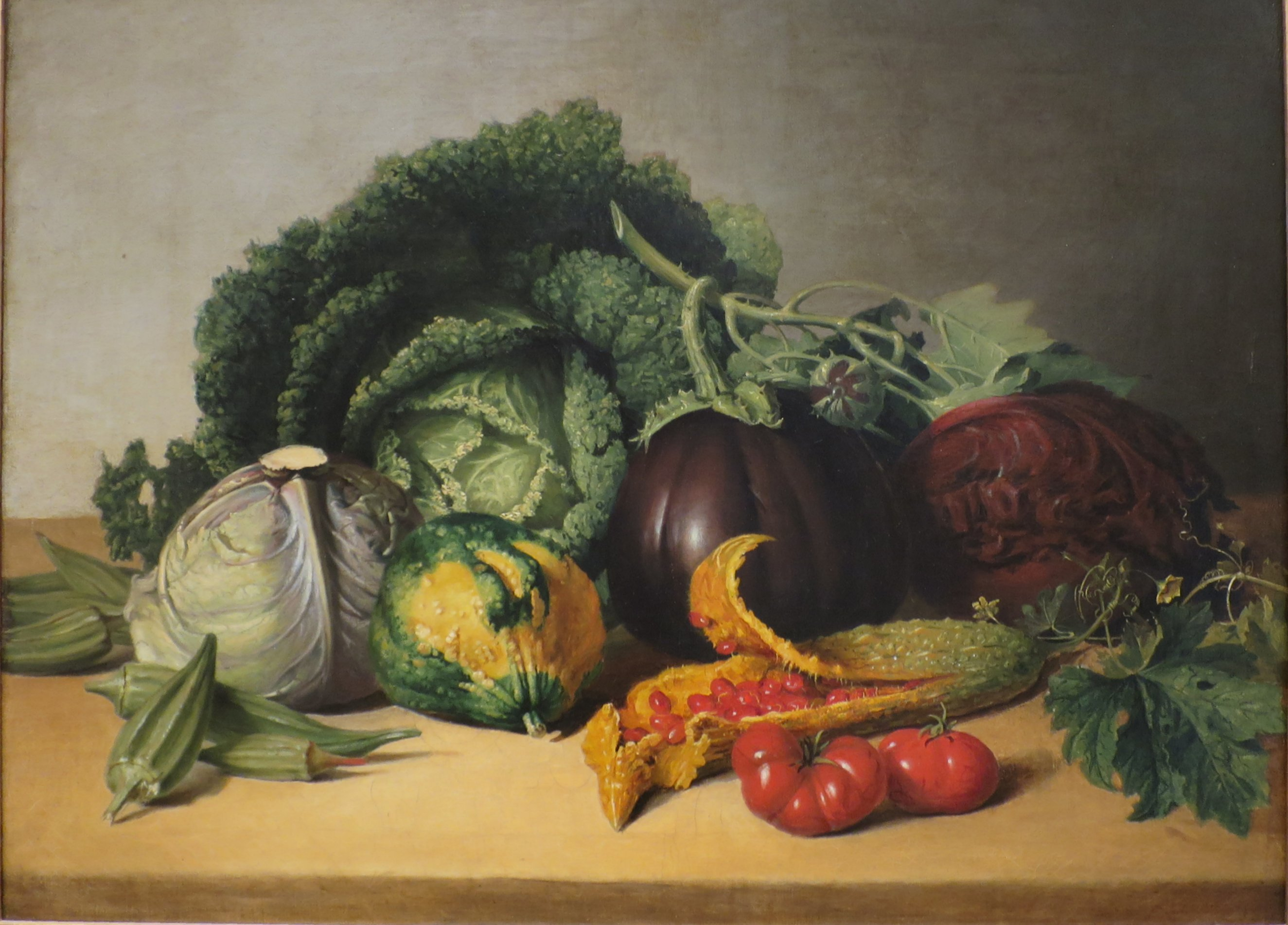
- Artist: James Peale
- Year: c. 1820s
- Medium: Oil on canvas
- Dimensions: 51.4 cm × 67.3 cm (20.2 in × 26.5 in)
- Location: Metropolitan Museum of Art

Still Life: Balsam Apple and Vegetables is an early 19th century oil painting by American painter James Peale. Done in oil on canvas, the painting depicts a number of vegetables set on a table. The work is currently on display at the Metropolitan Museum of Art. It is considered Peale's finest still life.

== Description ==
The painting is a still life, created to allow for an accurate representation of a physical object on a painted canvas. According to the Metropolitan Museum of Art's description of the work, the painting is possibly an "experimental exercise" created during the peak of Peale's career. The painting is noted as being similar to the Spanish School of still life painting due to its focus on vegetables.

=== Vegetables depicted ===
From left to right, the vegetables depicted in the painting are as follows,

- Far left - Okra (Abelmoschus esculentus)
- 2nd from left - Blue-green cabbage (Brassica oleracea var. capitata)
- 3rd from left - Savoy cabbage (Brassica oleracea var. sabauda)
- 4th from left - Hubbard squash (Cucurbita maxima)
- 5th from left - Eggplant (Solanum melongena)
- 6th from left - Balsam apple (Momordica charantia)
- 7th from left - Tomato (Solanum lycopersicum)
- 8th from left - Purple-red cabbage (Brassica oleracea var. capitata f. rubra)
- 9th from left (furthest right) - flowers and leaves of Balsam apple (Momordica charantia)
