= Maria Peale =

American painter (1787–1866)

- Born: 1787
- Died: 1866 (aged 78–79)
- Known for: Painting
- Movement: Still Life

Maria Peale (1787 – 1866) was an American painter, primarily of still-lifes.

== Life ==
She was the daughter of James Peale, the niece of Charles Willson Peale and the sister of Margaretta Angelica Peale, Sarah Miriam Peale, and Anna Claypoole Peale, but unlike her sisters she never pursued an artistic career. She only exhibited one painting, a still-life of vegetables; currently unlocated, it was shown at the Pennsylvania Academy of Fine Arts in 1811. No works by her are known to be extant, although a Still Life with Oranges, Pansies, and Liqueur has been tentatively ascribed to her. In the 1820s she and Margaretta assumed the responsibility of caring for their parents, freeing Anna and Sarah to pursue their careers.
