= Mary Jane Peale =

American painter

- Born: February 16, 1827; New York City, U.S.
- Died: November 22, 1902 (aged 75); Pottsville, Pennsylvania, U.S.
- Education: Trained within the Peale family artistic tradition; instruction from her father Rubens Peale
- Known for: Portraiture, still lifes
- Notable work: Still-life paintings (especially fruit and floral compositions); portrait miniatures
- Movement: American art

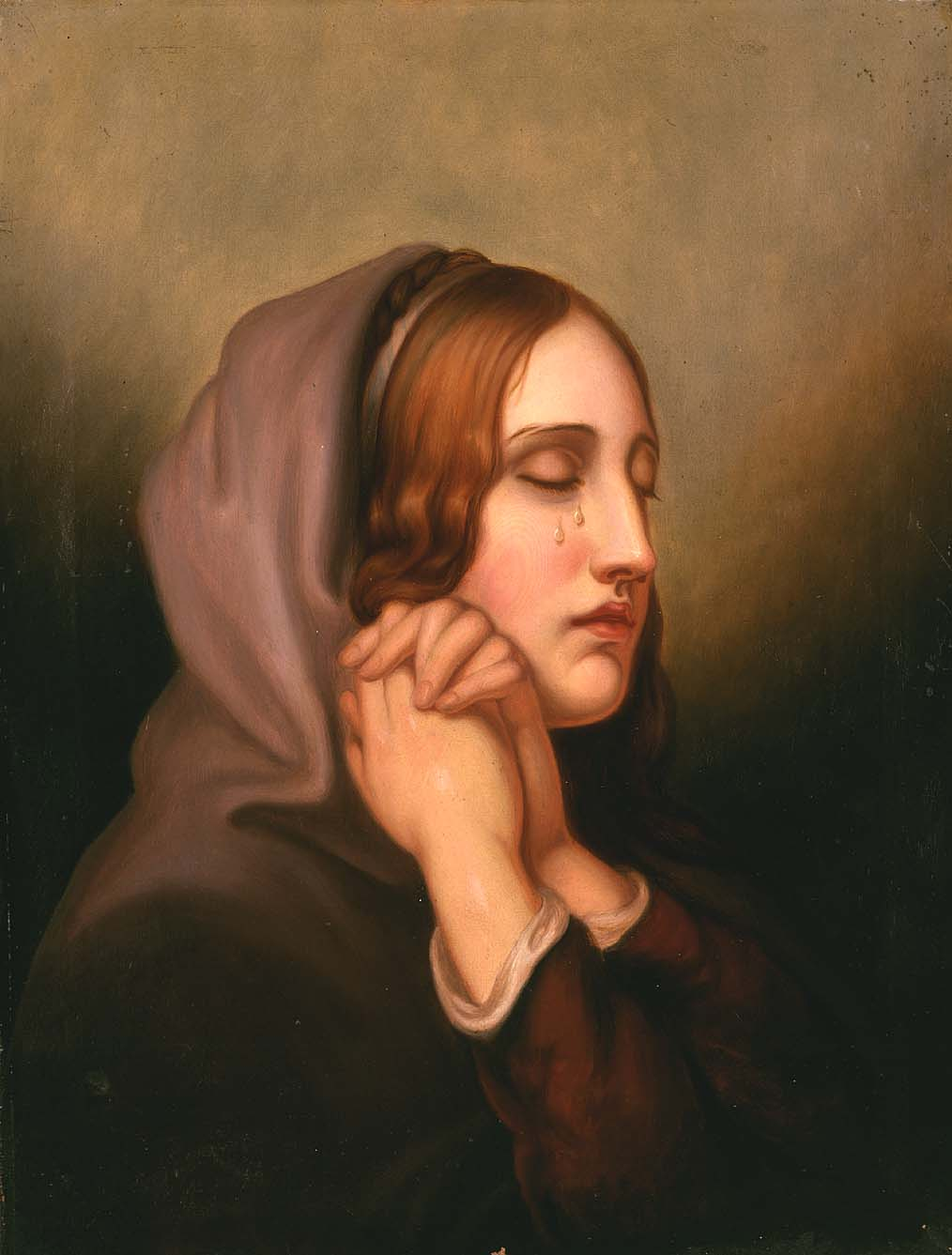
Pearl of Grief, 1855 by Mary Jane Peale

Mary Jane Peale (February 16, 1827 – November 22, 1902) was an American painter. She was the child of Rubens and Eliza Burd Patterson Peale, the only daughter among seven children, and was the granddaughter of Charles Willson Peale. She was among the last members of the Peale family to paint professionally, studying with her uncle Rembrandt and with Thomas Sully in Philadelphia, and was enrolled at the Pennsylvania Academy of Fine Arts.

She produced mainly portraits and still lifes, many of which featured flowers. Today her work may be seen at the Smithsonian American Art Museum, the Sheldon Museum of Art, and the Westmoreland Museum of American Art, among other museums.

She maintained a greenhouse at the Peale family home.

The papers and diaries of Mary Jane Peale are located in the American Philosophical Society in Philadelphia, PA, and include both original diaries and correspondence as well as photocopies. The contents of the collection is material related to Rubens and Eliza Peale, and the Peale family. Microfilm copies of this collection can be found in the Library of the Smithsonian Institution.

She is credited with teaching her father to paint, after his retirement, and there is evidence that some of the works attributed to him (such as Wedding Cake, Wine, Almonds, and Raisins and Rubens Peale in His Studio) may have instead been collaborative creations between the two. After Rubens died in 1865, Mary Jane finished the paintings he had been working on.

In her obituary, The New York Times said, "For a number of years she made her home in this city, but for several years had resided in Schuylkill County, at her place, "Riverside," the home of her childhood, on whose walls hung many ancient paintings by members of her family and portraits of Revolutionary heroes painted by her grandfather."
