= Mary Jane Simes =

American painter

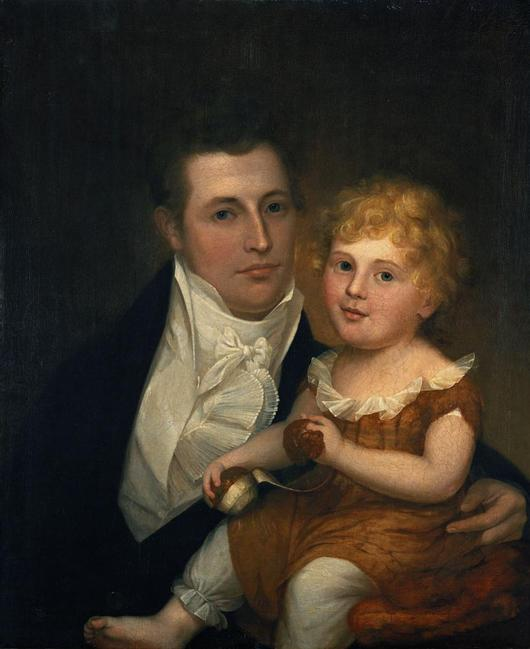
- Samuel and Mary Jane Simes.
- Born: 1807; Baltimore, Maryland
- Died: 1872 (aged 64–65)
- Style: Oils, miniatures

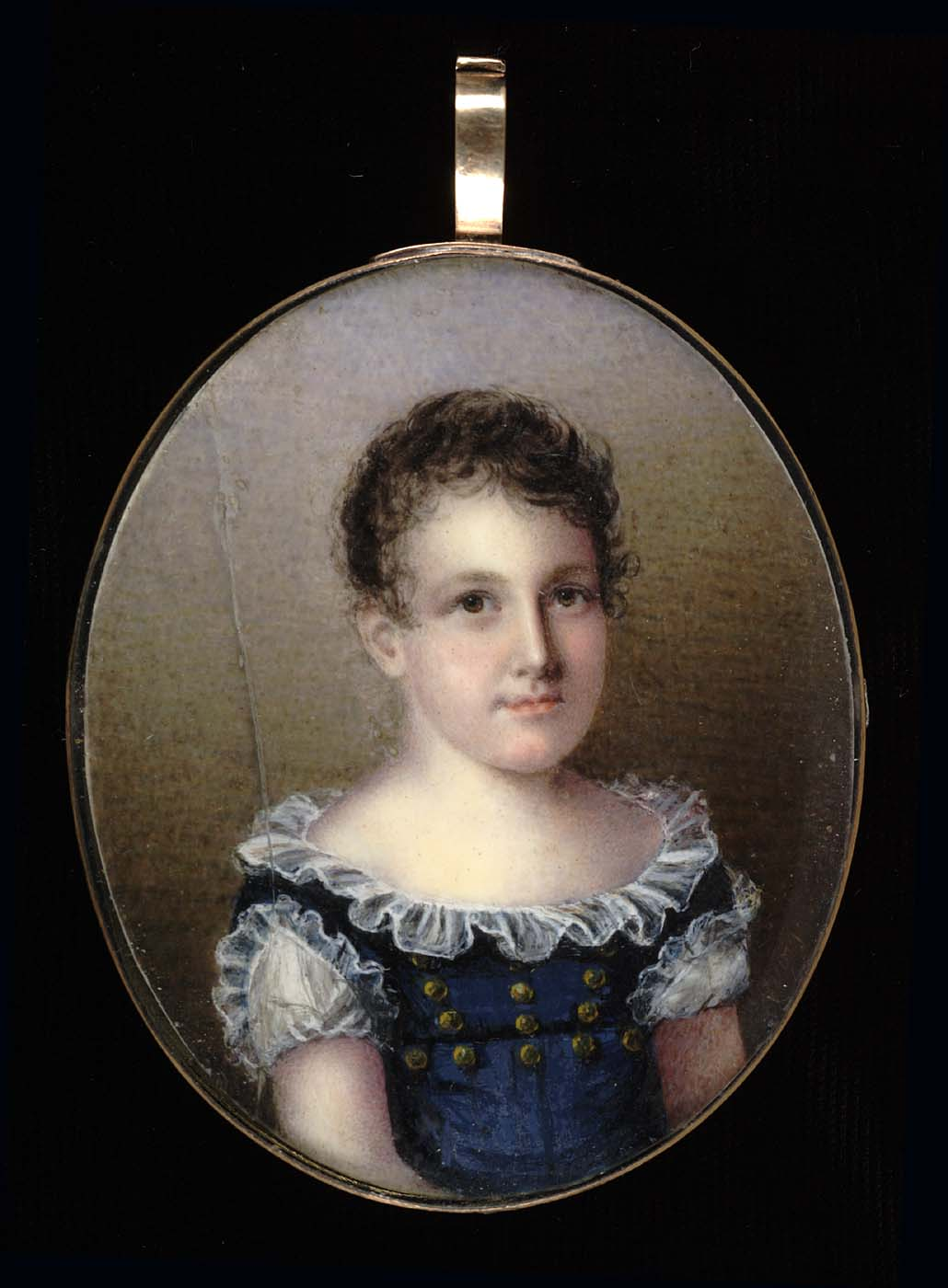
Portrait of a Young Girl, 1825, by Mary Jane Simes. Watercolor on ivory. Subject is believed to be a member of the Peale family.

Mary Jane Simes (1807–1872) was an American portrait painter who worked in both oils and painted miniatures. She was born in Baltimore in 1807 and died in 1872. Mary Jane Simes is a member of the Peale family, an important lineage of artists and cultural workers in 18th and 19th century America. She is a descendant of Charles Willson Peale, who established one of the first museums of art and natural history in the United States. Her aunts were Anna Claypoole Peale and Sarah Miriam Peale, who were known as miniaturists and oil painters, respectively. Simes lived with her aunt Sarah during a portion of her childhood. Her career as an exhibiting artist ended upon marriage to John Floyd Yeats.

== Career ==
Simes grew up amongst artists, and little of her early education is known. However, it is believed she was the only pupil of her aunt Anna, and she was important enough during her lifetime to be referenced in a compendium of women artists. Simes exhibited at the Pennsylvania Academy of Fine Arts throughout her short career. Simes was active from 1825 to 1835. Her work can be seen at the Maryland Historical Society, the Smithsonian Museum of American Art, the Cincinnati Art Museum, and the Cheekwood Museum of Art. Her work has been included in 20th century surveys of American Antiquities at the Baltimore Museum of Art.
