= Margaretta Angelica Peale =

American painter (1795–1882)

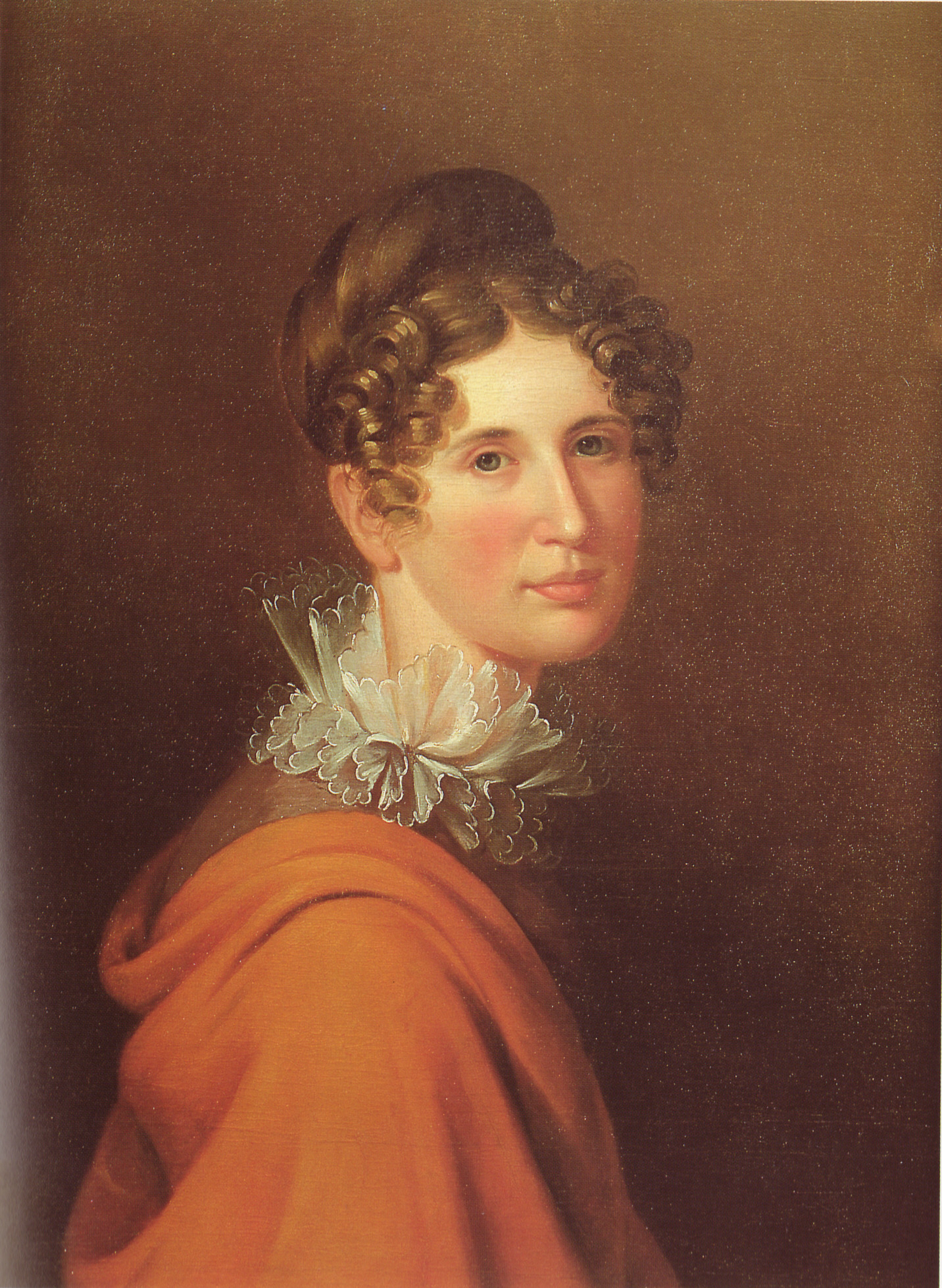
- Margaretta Peale by James Peale (1749-1831)
- Born: Margaretta Angelica Peale; October 1, 1795; Philadelphia, Pennsylvania, U.S.
- Died: January 17, 1882 (aged 86); Philadelphia, Pennsylvania, U.S.
- Education: James Peale
- Known for: Painting, still-lifes

Margaretta Angelica Peale (October 1, 1795 – January 17, 1882) was an American painter, one of the Peale family of artists. The daughter of James Peale, she was the sister of Sarah, Anna, and Maria Peale. Born in Philadelphia, Pennsylvania, she was taught by her father, and painted primarily still lifes, some of which were copies of his work.

Stylistically, her paintings are influenced by her father's work, her cousin Raphaelle Peale's still lifes, and seventeenth-century Dutch still lifes. Her works are noted for their "careful, precise observation" and "stark arrangements of objects". Her backgrounds tend to be "austere" or "neutral", setting off the colors and textures of her foreground objects.

Margaretta Angelica Peale died in Philadelphia and is buried there in Gloria Dei (Old Swedes') Church Burial Ground. Her paintings may be found in numerous collections, including the Pennsylvania Academy of the Fine Arts in Philadelphia, of which she was a founding member.

== Works in museum collections (incomplete list) ==
- Melon, Cherries, and Plums, 1836, oil on canvas, Philadelphia Museum of Art 2010-70-1
- Strawberries and Cherries, no date, oil on canvas, Pennsylvania Academy of the Fine Arts 1924.11
- Still Life with Watermelon and Peaches, 1828, oil on canvas, Smith College Museum of Art 1952:53
- Stephen Chapin, D.D. and other portraits at George Washington University

== Gallery ==
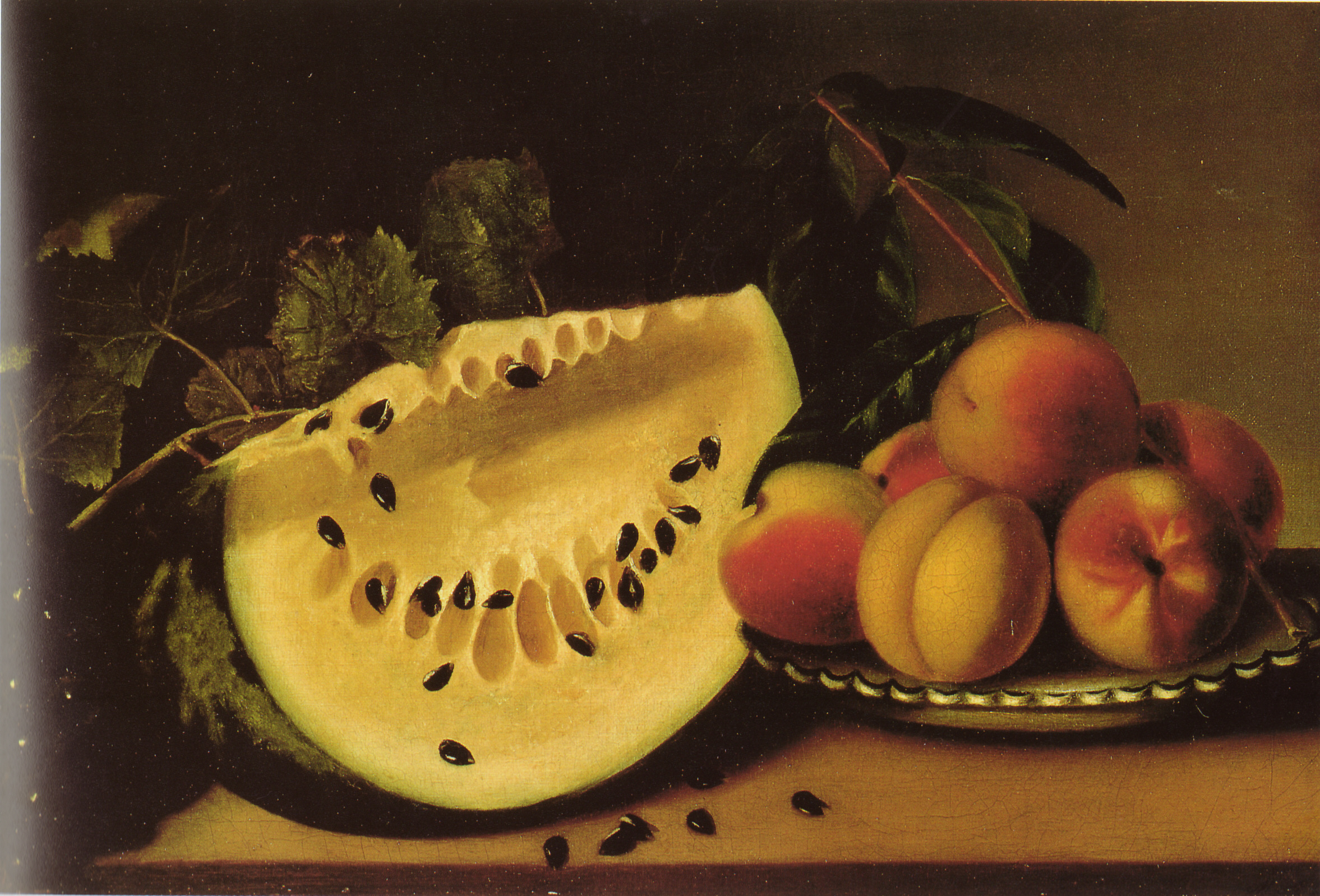
Still Life with Watermelon and Peaches

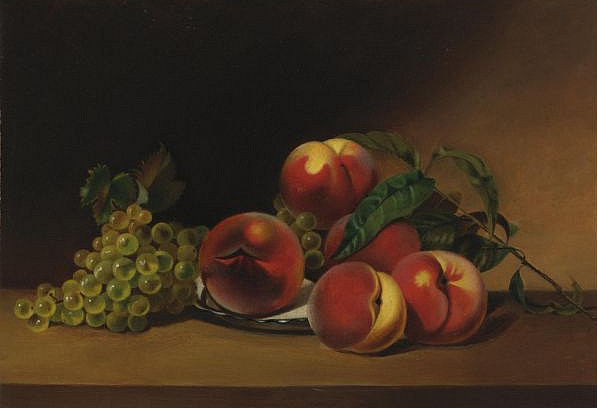
Peaches and Grapes

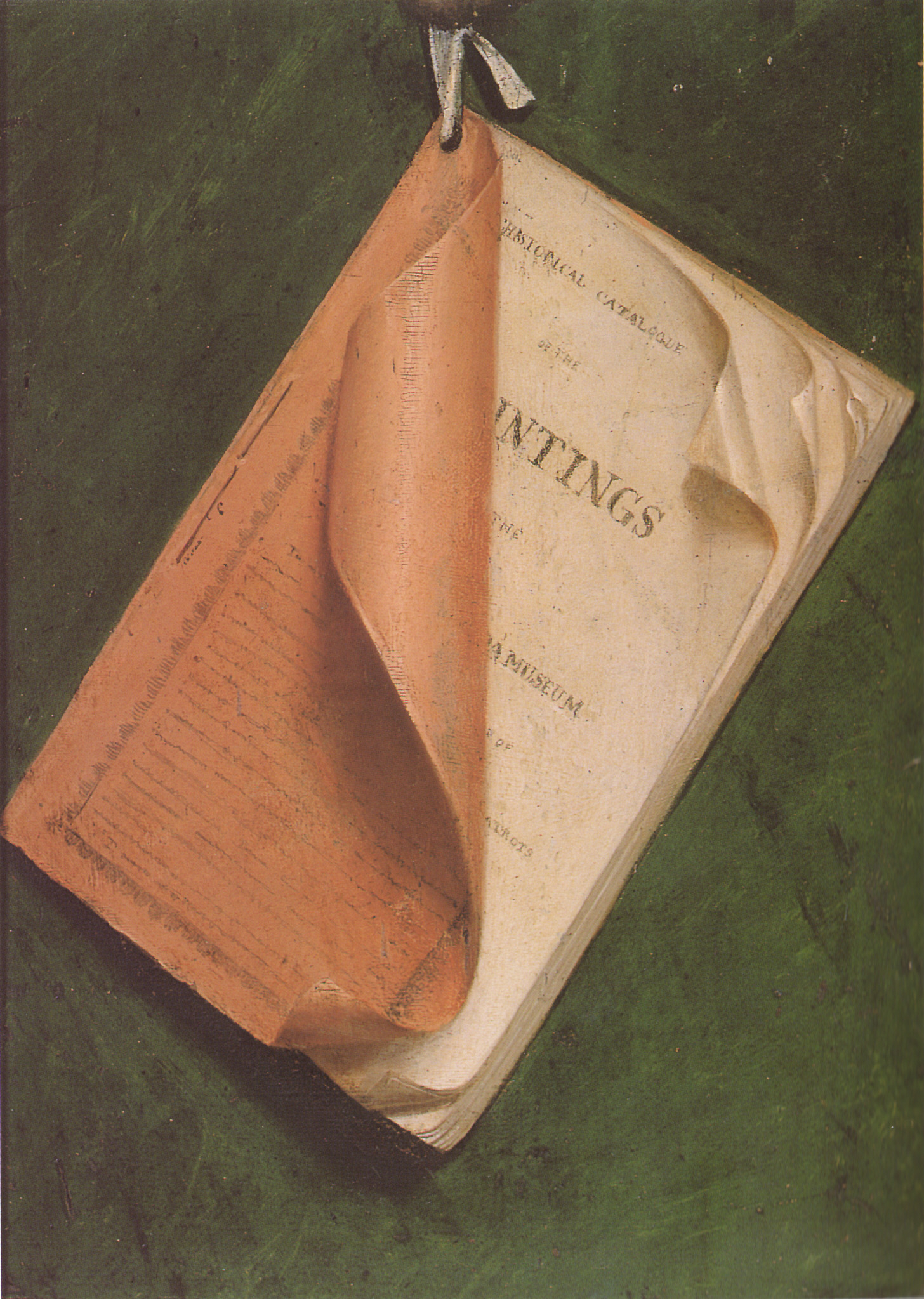
A Deception (after Raphaelle Peale)
