= Anna Claypoole Peale =

American painter (1791–1878)

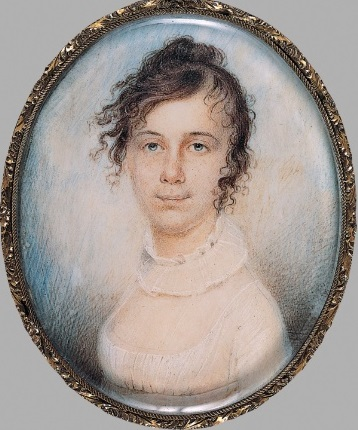
- Anna Claypoole Peale, by James Peale, c. 1805
- Born: March 6, 1791; Philadelphia, Pennsylvania, US
- Died: December 25, 1878 (aged 87); Philadelphia, Pennsylvania, US
- Known for: Portrait miniature
- Spouse(s): William Staughton, 1829; William Duncan 1841-1864

Anna Claypoole Peale (March 6, 1791 – December 25, 1878) was an American painter who specialized in portrait miniatures on ivory and still lifes. She and her sister, Sarah Miriam Peale, were the first women elected academicians of the Pennsylvania Academy of the Fine Arts.

== Early life ==
Anna Claypoole Peale was born on March 6, 1791, in Philadelphia, Pennsylvania, to James Peale (1749–1831) and Mary Chambers Claypoole Peale (1753–1829). Anna was the fourth of six children, and the third daughter. Her siblings were: Jane Ramsay (1785–1834), Maria (1787–1866), James Jr. (1789–1876), Margaretta Angelica (1795–1882), Sarah Miriam (Sally) (1800–1885) and Eleanor. Anna was the only child to carry the Claypoole name, and used it throughout her career. From a young age Anna watched her father, a miniature portrait artist, painting in his studio to learn the art form, "hours and hours at a time watching James progress. He took great pains in teaching her, pointing out the peculiar touches that produced his best efforts by giving a charm to the expression". Her entrepreneurial inclinations were evident at the age of 14 when she copied two French landscapes and sold them at auction for a good price.

Under her father's guidance, Anna began studying portraiture, and was able to capture viable likenesses of her sitters. Her father was likely encouraged to train Anna by his brother Charles Willson Peale who, with William Rush, co-founded the first American art academy, the Pennsylvania Academy of the Fine Arts (PAFA). Anna served a five-year apprenticeship with her father, in whose studio she was later joined by her sisters Sarah Miriam and Margaretta Angelica. Anna must have been about sixteen when she painted Girl with a Book, circa 1807. This portrait communicates the artist's pleasure in the act of painting, which is revealed in a lambent play of light on the figure. The subject holds a book on which the artist's name is substituted for the title on the cover. From about 1810, Peale's paintings are generally signed, and as the artist adapted a professional persona, she added the initial C, an acknowledgement of her mother's family, the Claypooles, to her signature.

In 1811, at age 20, Anna participated in the first exhibition at the Pennsylvania Academy of the Fine Arts, which was also her first major exhibition. There, she exhibited a still life in oils. Three years later, in 1814, she exhibited her first group of three miniatures at the Pennsylvania Academy's annual exhibition, two years after her father showed his last miniatures there. This was a signal to the public that Anna would assume commissions for portrait miniatures that her father would henceforth decline. But these expectations proved to be unrealistic when the War of 1812, fought mainly at sea, moved closer to home. On August 24, British troops marched into Washington, D.C., and within 24 hours systematically torched major government buildings. As the British advanced on Baltimore, the annual exhibition at the Pennsylvania Academy had just concluded. Twelve years later, in 1824, Anna and her sister Sarah Miriam became the first women elected as academicians to the Pennsylvania Academy of the Fine Arts.

== Family ==
Anna's success in portraiture followed generations of portrait artists in her family. Charles Willson Peale, her uncle, was an important figure in the introduction of miniature painting in the American colonies. Her father also contributed to the evolution of the practice. Her sisters, Sarah Miriam, Maria, and Margaretta Angelica Peale were accomplished artists as well: Sarah Miriam as a portrait painter, and Maria and Margaretta Angelica as still life painters.

Both Peale brothers believed in pushing their children toward artistic careers. James Peale and Charles Willson Peale both had influential standing in the lives of their children, nieces and nephews.

Anna married William Staughton on August 27, 1829, who died in December 1829, in Washington, D.C. After his passing, she returned to Philadelphia to continue her studio portrait practice. Eleven years later, in 1841, she married General William Duncan, and retired from painting shortly thereafter.

Anna had no children. She did have four nieces and nephews: Mary Jane Simes (1807–1872), James G. Peale (1823–1891), Washington Peale (1825–1868) and Mary V. Peale (1828–1867).

== Career ==
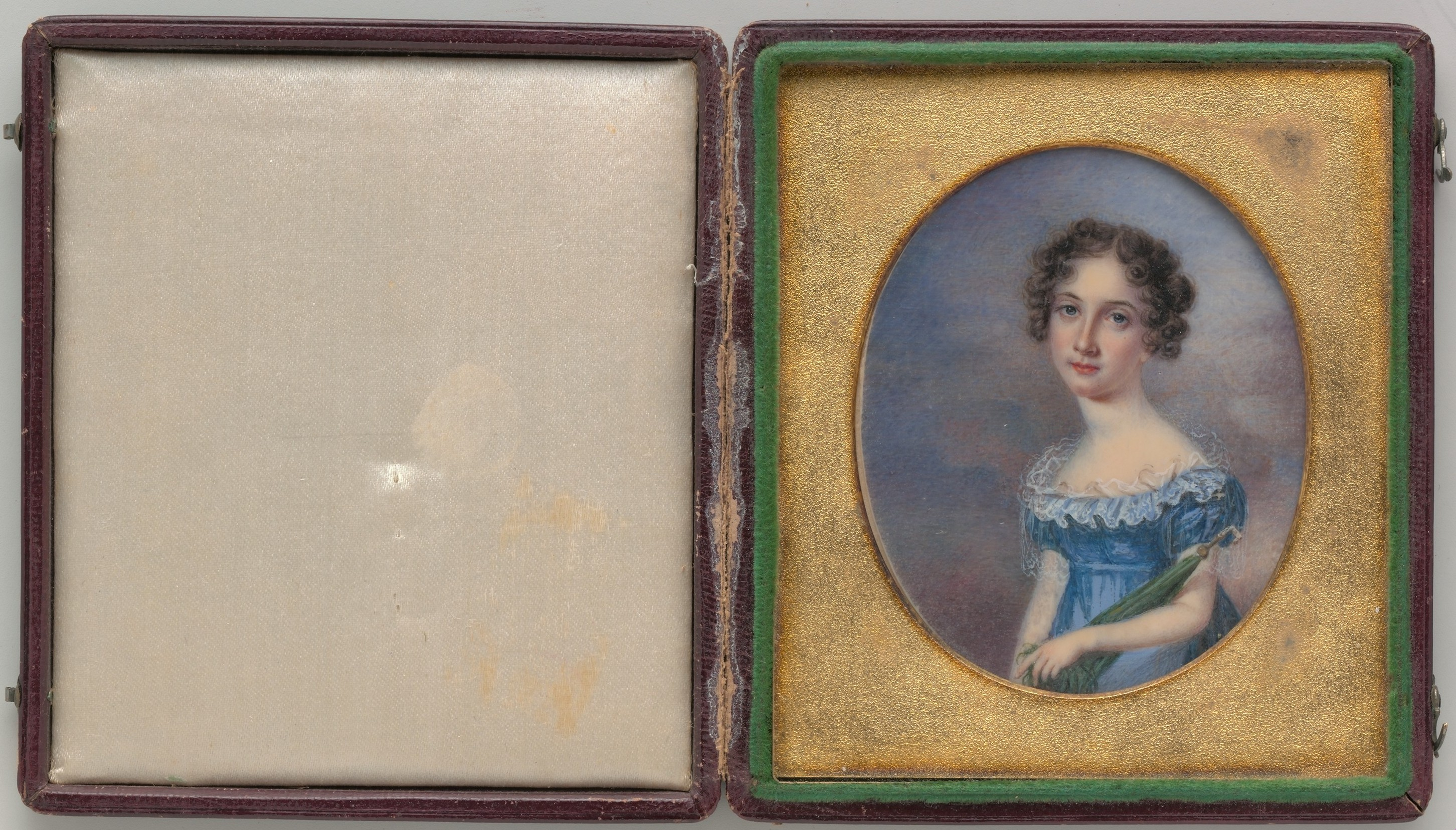
Sarah Ann Beck, Anna Claypoole Peale, Metropolitan Museum of Art

The United States experienced an increase in wealth during the 19th century, a change that broadened the clientele for miniatures. In addition, Anna's training under her father was advantageous to her because the miniature craft was traditionally acquired slowly and in a master/apprentice capacity.

The gracefully precise portrait of Little Girl, an 1817 watercolor on ivory, was one of several works that launched Anna Claypoole Peale's reputation, circa 1817. The figure appears in an atmospheric background that is unlike the cloudy skies typical of neoclassical portrait miniatures. Rather than exploring the translucency of the ivory to render skin tones, Peale used dark rich colors and glazing to resemble the effect of oil paints, and this became the hallmark of her style.

Some of Anna's notable sitters included President James Monroe and President Andrew Jackson, Senator and Colonel Richard Mentor Johnson, as well as an ambassador, scientists, and theologians. Numerous men and women from Philadelphia, Boston, Baltimore, Washington and Richmond Virginia, including many businessmen and their wives, also became sitters. Peale sometimes exhibited under the names Mrs. Staughton and Mrs. Duncan as well as Anna Claypoole Peale.

=== Early career ===
Anna was noted as someone who applied herself to her work with diligence and ambition. She developed a degree of precision in her work which enabled her to contribute to supporting her parents James and Mary. As early as 1805, at age 14, she sold her first paintings, which were two oil paint reproductions of Vernet landscapes, earning her $30—a considerable sum at the time.

Along with Anna's dedication, her uncle Charles Willson Peale assisted in her early career. He promoted her potential for commercial success, and sought commissions for her. Charles once said, “Her merit in miniature painting brings her into high estimation, and so many Ladies and Gentleman desire to sit for her that she frequently is obliged to raise her prices.” Anna's brother also assisted her in her early success by accompanying her on her trip to Boston.

=== Subject matter and style ===
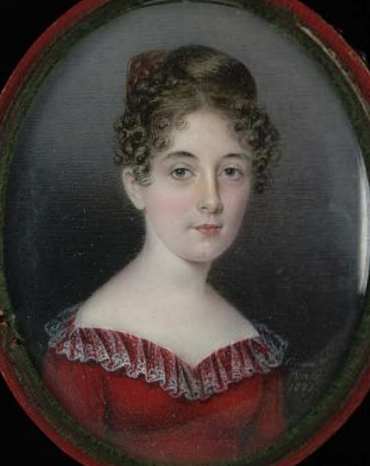
Woman in a Red Dress, 1821

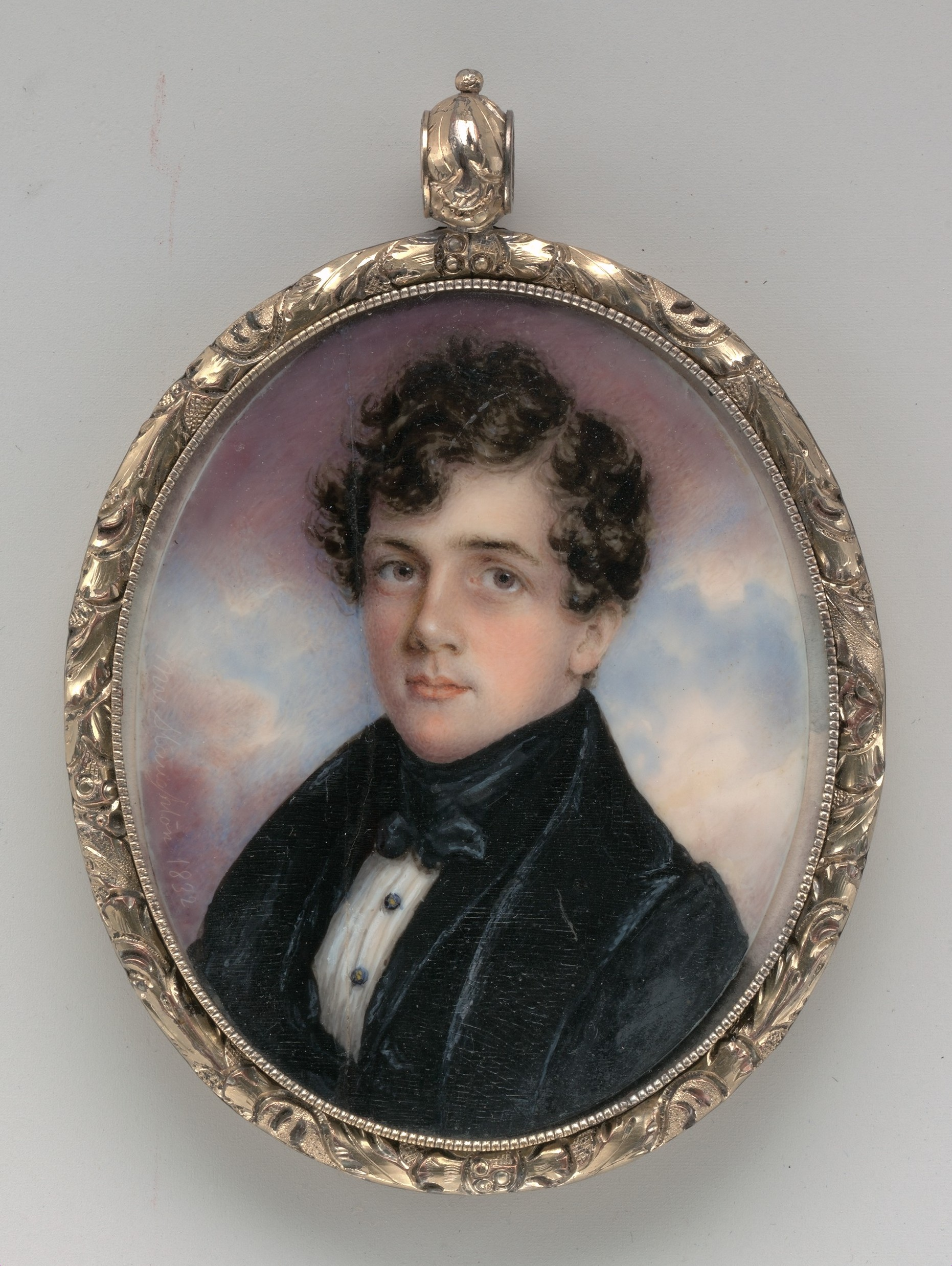
Portrait of a Gentleman, 1832

Anna Claypoole Peale was known to have painted at least one hundred and forty miniatures, still lifes, landscapes and portraits in oils.

Anna's style was influenced by her father, who taught her how to skillfully blend pigments to control color density with watercolors on ivory. However, she adjusted this technique to develop her own style. Another familial influence on Anna's work most likely came from her cousin, Titian Ramsay Peale (1780–1798). When she was a small child, Titian was researching and writing about techniques for transferring images onto ivory. After examination, it was found that Anna used similar techniques on her own paintings to help watercolor adhere to ivory.

Praise for her miniature work started as early as 1812, though she didn't exhibit until 1814. Most critiques focused on her adept abilities with color and capturing a sitter's likeness.

From 1817 to 1818 Anna experienced much success in her career. This period is marked by a work now owned by PAFA titled Mme. Lallemand. This commissioned portrait of Harriet Girard Lallemand in 1818 was a stepping stone for Anna into a successful career as a portrait artist. As is common in her style, this work is mainly respected for its mastery of color; “heightened by the transparent blue shadows of reflected color under the chin that give definition to the features”. In 1818, Charles Willson Peale wrote to his son Rembrandt Peale about Anna's work, “I saw one [a miniature] she had done of a gentleman in which the colouring was of superior excellence”.

A rose in the sitter's hair became a motif in Anna's work during the 1820s.

In the summer of 1818, Anna had to take a break because of severe inflammation of her eyes. However, she returned to painting the following November.

=== Washington ===
In November 1818, Anna accompanied her aging uncle Charles Willson Peale and his wife Hannah Peale on a painting expedition to Washington, D.C. The mission of this trip was to promote Anna's “potential for commercial success,” to seek commissions and to produce portraits to send back to Philadelphia to be put on exhibition at The Pennsylvania Academy of the Fine Arts. John Wayles Eppes (1773–1823), Thomas Jefferson's son-in-law, was one of the prominent men who visited the Peales' studio in Washington. He asked her to paint a miniature of him, and suggested that Charles Willson Peale time his sittings with hers. On April 7, 1819, Anna had returned to Philadelphia from Washington and was deluged with work. She wrote to her cousin Titian Ramsay Peale (1799–1885): "I have so much work to do that I hardly know what to do with myself and am looking out the window...While sitting at my painting this afternoon--Mr. Sully came down to give us tickets and invitations from Mr. Calhoun to attend his anatomical lectures as relating to the arts--Sally [Sarah Miriam Peale] and myself ... were much interested in a lecture on the human skull."

Between mid-November 1818 and February 1819, Anna and her uncle both painted portraits of President James Monroe (1759–1831) in the White House during his presidency. The locations of these paintings are currently unknown. During their time in Washington, Anna and Charles also had the opportunity to paint the portrait of Major General Andrew Jackson (1767–1845), who later became the seventh president of the United States.

Anna's portrait of Jackson is now housed at Yale University Art Gallery in New Haven, Connecticut. She positioned Jackson low on the ivory against a turbulent, cloud-filled sky, handled like a theatrical backdrop evoking past battles. When she painted the miniature in 1819, Jackson as making a sweep though the country, hailed as a hero.

While attending President Monroe's New Year's levee, Anna continued to expand her clientele for commissions. Anna accompanied Kentucky Senator Colonel Richard Mentor Johnson to the levee. The colonel later sat for one of her portraits. After the levee, Anna boarded with Reverend Obadiah Brown (1779–1852) and his wife Elizabeth, and produced portrait miniatures of them as well.

=== Late career ===
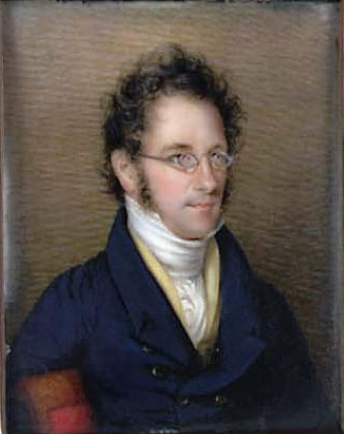
Rubens Peale, 1822

Between 1819 and 1829, Anna produced numerous miniatures. In a letter Anna wrote to Titian Ramsay Peale II in April 1819, she explained that she had been given tickets by Thomas Sully to attend 15 anatomical lectures by Mr. Calhoun with her sister Sarah Miriam. This series of anatomical studies assisted her already successful portrait work in the decade to follow.

In 1820, Anna painted a portrait of her cousin Rembrandt Peale's daughter, Rosalba Peale. The miniature of Rosalba was an experiment to break away from oval miniatures and work with a three quarter, half-length pose with props of tables and drapery. This increase in size makes the familial controversy that surrounded the creation of this work even more curious.

Anna's portrait of Rosalba was intended to be a gift to a married couple, the Robinsons. However, after hearing this, Charles Willson Peale wrote to his family and questioned the motives of his granddaughter's portrait being given to a married man. Because this portrait does not have the same degree of delicate color work as others Anna was producing at the time, it is suspected that Charles’ letter caused her to leave the painting unfinished. The work was also never given to the Robinsons, but stayed in Anna's studio. Regardless of its possibly unfinished state, this miniature remained an example of the artist's superb handling of color.

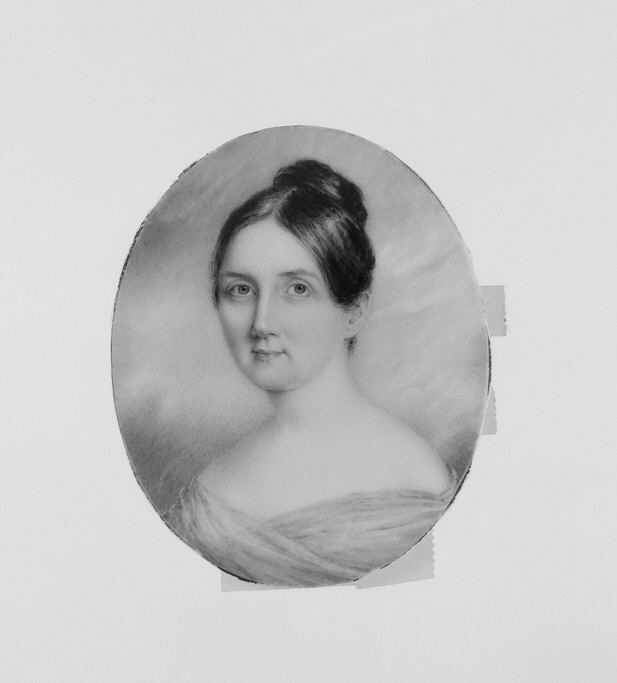
Mrs. Samuel Vaughan, 1838

In 1822, Anna completed a portrait of Rubens Peale which is regarded as one of the high points of her oeuvre. She completed another portrait of an extended member of the Peale clan in 1824, Abraham Sellers (Rosenbach Museum & Library, Philadelphia). Throughout her later career, Anna continued to exhibit artwork separate from her miniature portrait business. In 1824 Anna exhibited a copy of Jean-Baptiste Isabey's Miniature Portrait of Napoleon after Isabey. In 1828 she exhibited some of her miniatures at the Boston Athenaeum. A critic commented on her portrait of Mrs. Judson, wife of the Burmese Missionary: "dress extremely well finished...but the face appeared as if emerging from a murky atmosphere". Then in 1829, she exhibited Beatrice Cenci after Guido Reni not only at PAFA, but also, in 1831, at the Boston Athenaeum.

After a long career, Anna Claypoole Peale was the last miniature painter in an unbroken line of artists in the Peale family. Her career ended circa 1842, coinciding with the decline of the portrait miniature in the United States.

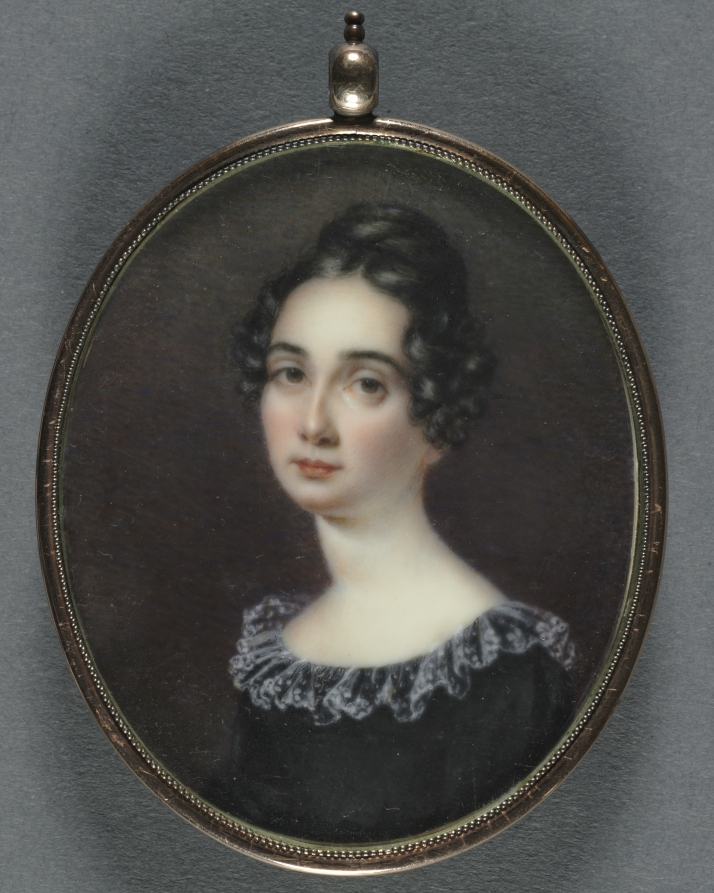
Portrait of a Woman, 1820, watercolor on ivory on a gilt metal locket with red leather case, framed: 7.1 x 6 cm (2 3/4 x 2 5/16 in.)

== Death ==
On Christmas Day, at age 87, Anna Claypoole Peale died in Philadelphia and was buried in The Woodlands Cemetery.

== Exhibits and awards ==
- 1811 Anna Peale made her first appearance at PAFA, exhibiting a still life in oils.
- 1814, Anna Peale exhibited her first group of three miniatures at PAFA's spring exhibition.
- 1818 Anna Peale had critical recognition of her work shown at the PAFA. Afterwards, Charles Willson Peale wrote, "Anna Peale is of the first reputation in her line and has an abundance of sitters”".
- In Baltimore on September 30, 1822 was the first advertisement of “FIRST ANNUAL EXHIBITION OF Sculpture, Paintings, Drawings, Engravings, &c.”, an exhibit that Anna's work was included in, as written by Rubens Peale.
- 1823 Anna Peale exhibited two portraits at the Peale Museum in Baltimore. These two portraits were reproductions of Jean-Baptiste Duchesne's paintings His Lady and Napoleon After Duchesne.
- 1824 Anna Peale was honored as an academician at the Pennsylvania Academy of the Fine Arts, Philadelphia, PA, US.
- 1824, Anna Peale showed another reproduction at the Pennsylvania Academy of the Fine Arts, of Jean-Baptiste Isabey's Miniature Portrait of Napoleon after Isabey.
- 1829, Anna Peale exhibited her painting Beatrice Cenci after Guido Reni at The Pennsylvania Academy of the Fine Arts, and again in 1831 at the Boston Athenaeum.

== Legacy ==
Womanhouse (January 30 – February 28, 1972) was a feminist art installation and performance space organized by Judy Chicago and Miriam Schapiro, co-founders of the California Institute of the Arts (CalArts) Feminist Art Program, and was the first public exhibition of art centered upon female empowerment. One of the rooms in it, Dining Room, by Beth Bachenheimer, Sherry Brody, Karen LeCocq, Robin Mitchell, Miriam Schapiro, and Faith Wilding, has among other things a mural, based on a 19th-century still life by Anna Peale, displayed on a wall behind the dining room table. Dining Room is the most collaborative project in Womanhouse, utilizing the efforts of seven women to complete. It is meant to express a generous, bountiful and romantic aura.
