= James Peale =

American painter (1749–1831)

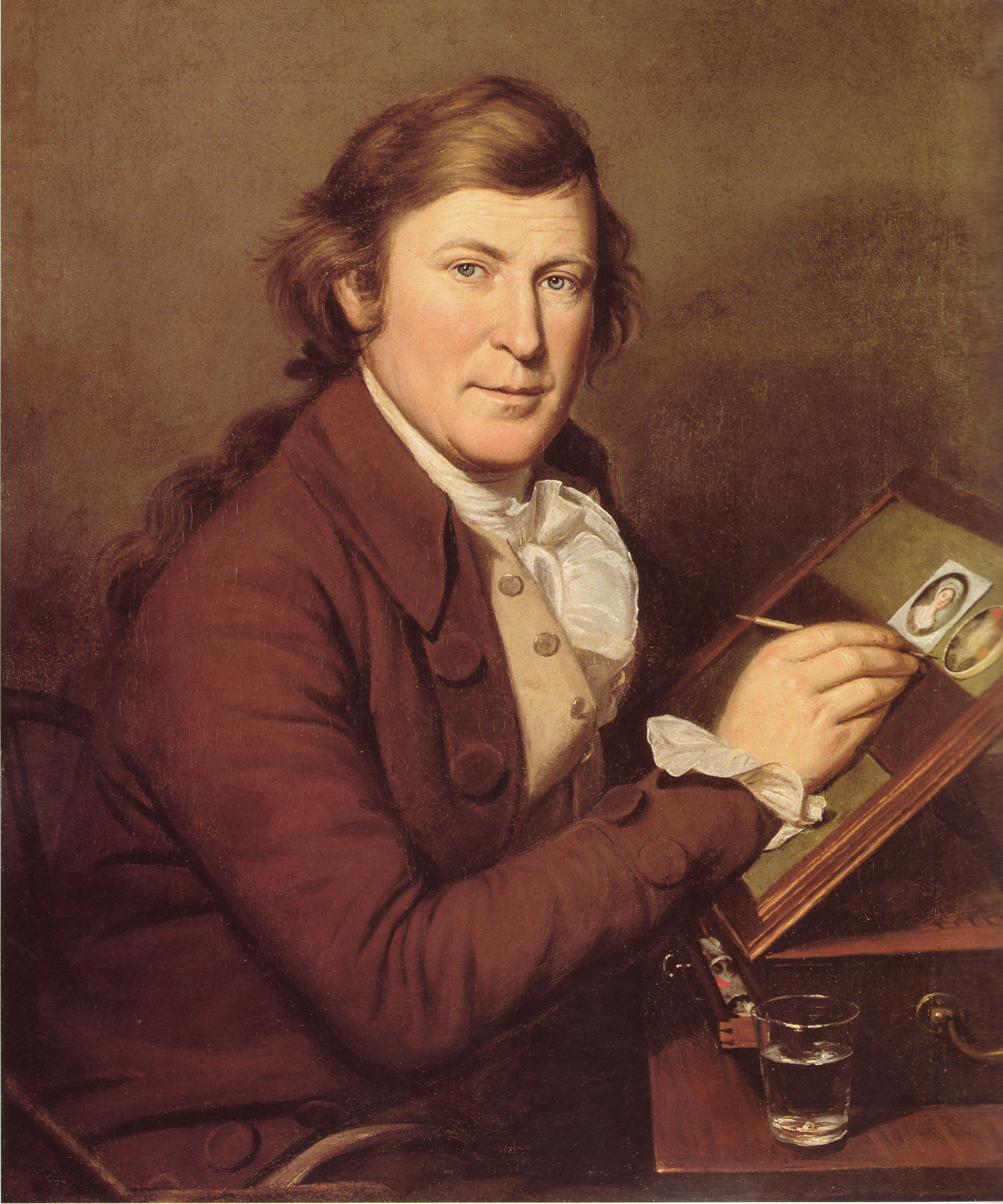
- James Peale Painting a Miniature by Charles Willson Peale
- Born: 1749; Chestertown, Maryland, British America
- Died: May 24, 1831 (aged 81–82)
- Education: Charles Willson Peale
- Known for: Painting
- Relatives: Peale family

James Peale (1749 – May 24, 1831) was an American painter, best known for his miniature and still life paintings, and a younger brother of noted painter Charles Willson Peale.

== Early life ==
Peale was born in Chestertown, Maryland, the second child, after Charles, of Charles Peale (1709–1750) and Margaret Triggs (1709–1791). His father died when he was an infant, and the family moved to Annapolis.

In 1762, he began to serve apprenticeships there, first in a saddlery and later in a cabinetmaking shop. After his brother Charles returned from London in 1769, where he had studied with Benjamin West, Peale served as his assistant and learned how to paint.

== Career ==
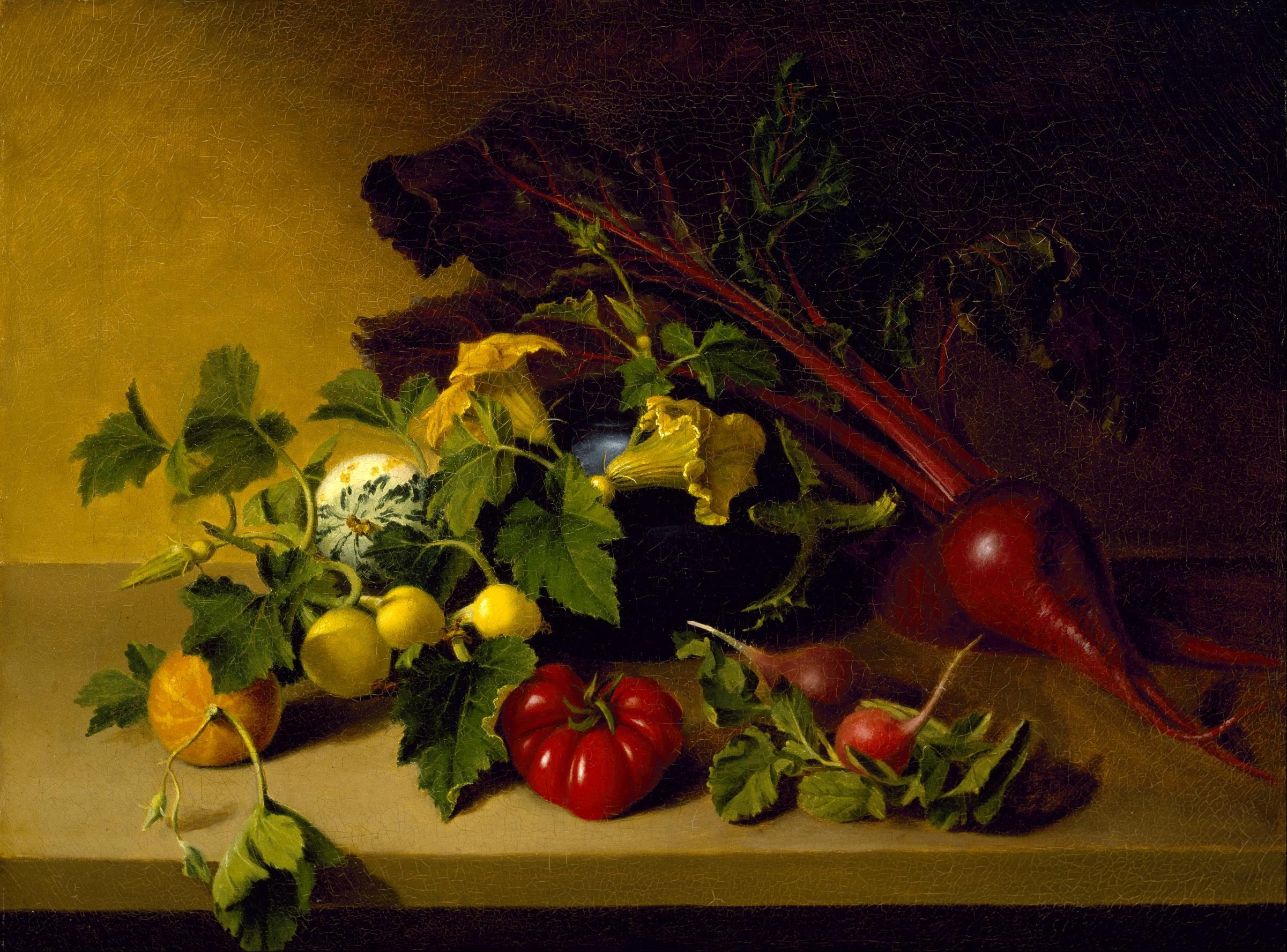
Still Life with Vegetables

Peale worked in his brother's studio until January 14, 1776, when he accepted a commission in the Continental Army as an ensign in William Smallwood's regiment. Within three months he was promoted to captain, and during the next three years fought in the battles of Long Island, White Plains, Trenton, Princeton, Brandywine, Germantown, and Monmouth. He resigned his army commission in 1779, and moved to Philadelphia to live with his brother. (One notable later collaboration, however, was in 1788 to make floats for Philadelphia's Federal Procession in honor of the newly drafted United States Constitution).

At the conclusion of the Revolutionary War Peale was admitted as an original member of The Society of the Cincinnati of Maryland when it was established in 1783.

At the outset of his painting career Peale painted portraits and still-life, and by the mid-1780s had established his reputation. At about this time, however, Charles turned over his own miniature portrait practice to him, and throughout the 1790s and early 19th century Peale devoted himself to miniature painting. Much of this work was watercolor on ivory. In 1795 Peale exhibited a still life of fruit along with nine miniatures and his family portrait at the Columbianum, a short-lived art academy in Philadelphia. Around 1810, as Peale's eyesight began to weaken, he gave up painting miniatures to turn to large portraits and still-life subjects that were greatly admired and widely exhibited in Philadelphia, Boston, and Baltimore.

The total number of Peale's landscape paintings remains unknown, but he executed more than 200 watercolor miniatures on ivory, perhaps 100 still-life paintings, fewer than 70 oil portraits, and at least 8 history paintings.

== Personal life ==
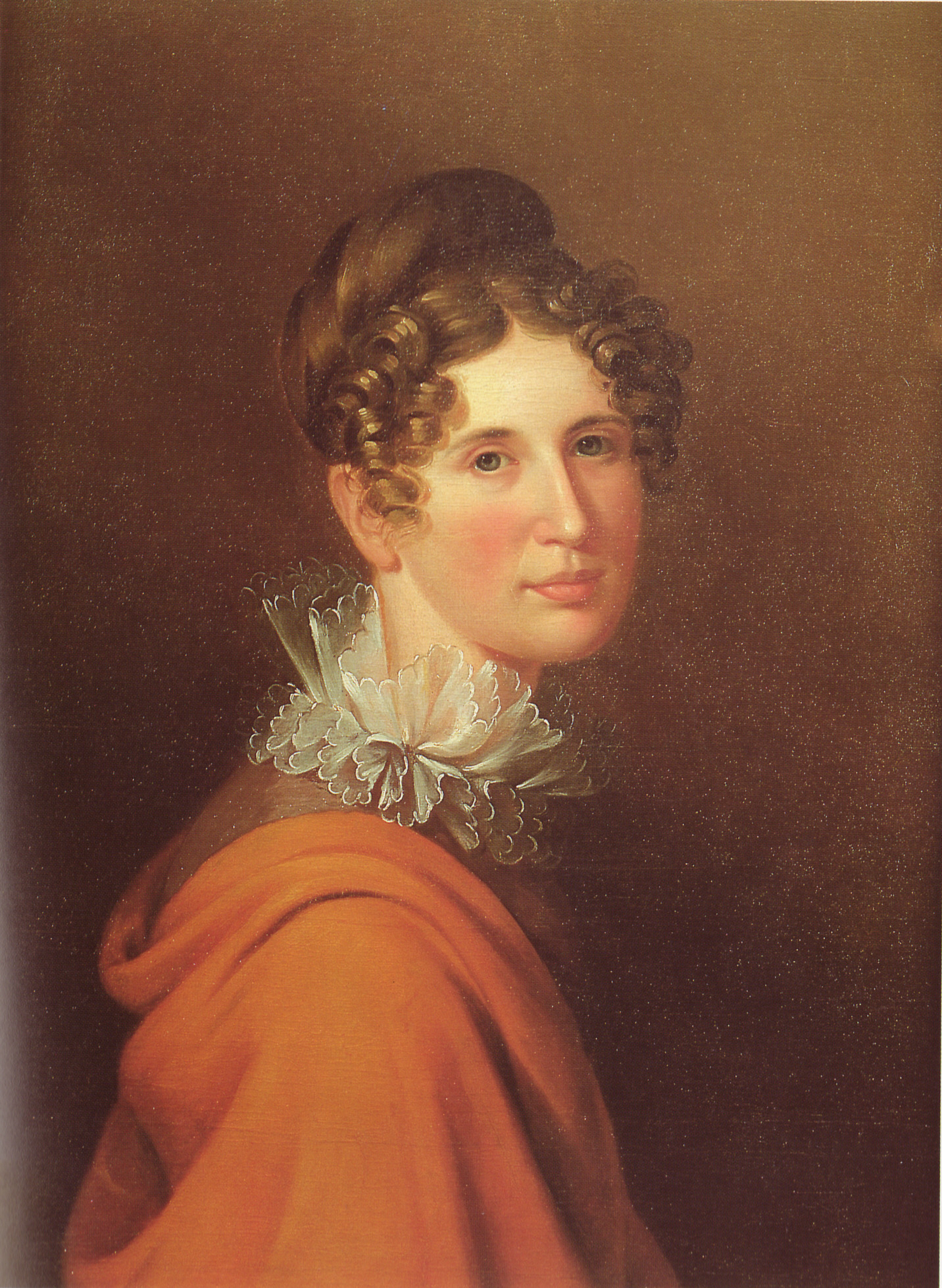
Margaretta Angelica Peale, one of the painter's daughters

In 1782 he married Mary Claypoole (1753-1828), a daughter of James Claypoole and sister of portrait painter James Claypoole Jr., after which he established his own household and artistic career. Together, Mary and James were the parents of seven children, three of whom became accomplished painters in their own right, including:

- Maria Claypoole Peale (1787–1866) also became a painter of still lifes, though of less distinction than her sisters.
- James Peale Jr. (1789–1876), who married his cousin, Sophonisba Peale (1801–1878), daughter of Raphaelle Peale.
- Anna Claypoole Peale (1791–1878), a miniaturist and still-life painter
- Margaretta Angelica Peale (1796–1882), painter of trompe l’oeil subjects and tabletop fruit
- Sarah Miriam Peale (1800–1885), a portraitist and still-life painter considered the first American woman to succeed as a professional artist
- Jane Ramsay Peale
- Eleanor Peale.

Peale died in Philadelphia on May 24, 1831, and is buried at Gloria Dei (Old Swedes') Church cemetery along with this wife and six children.

== Gallery ==
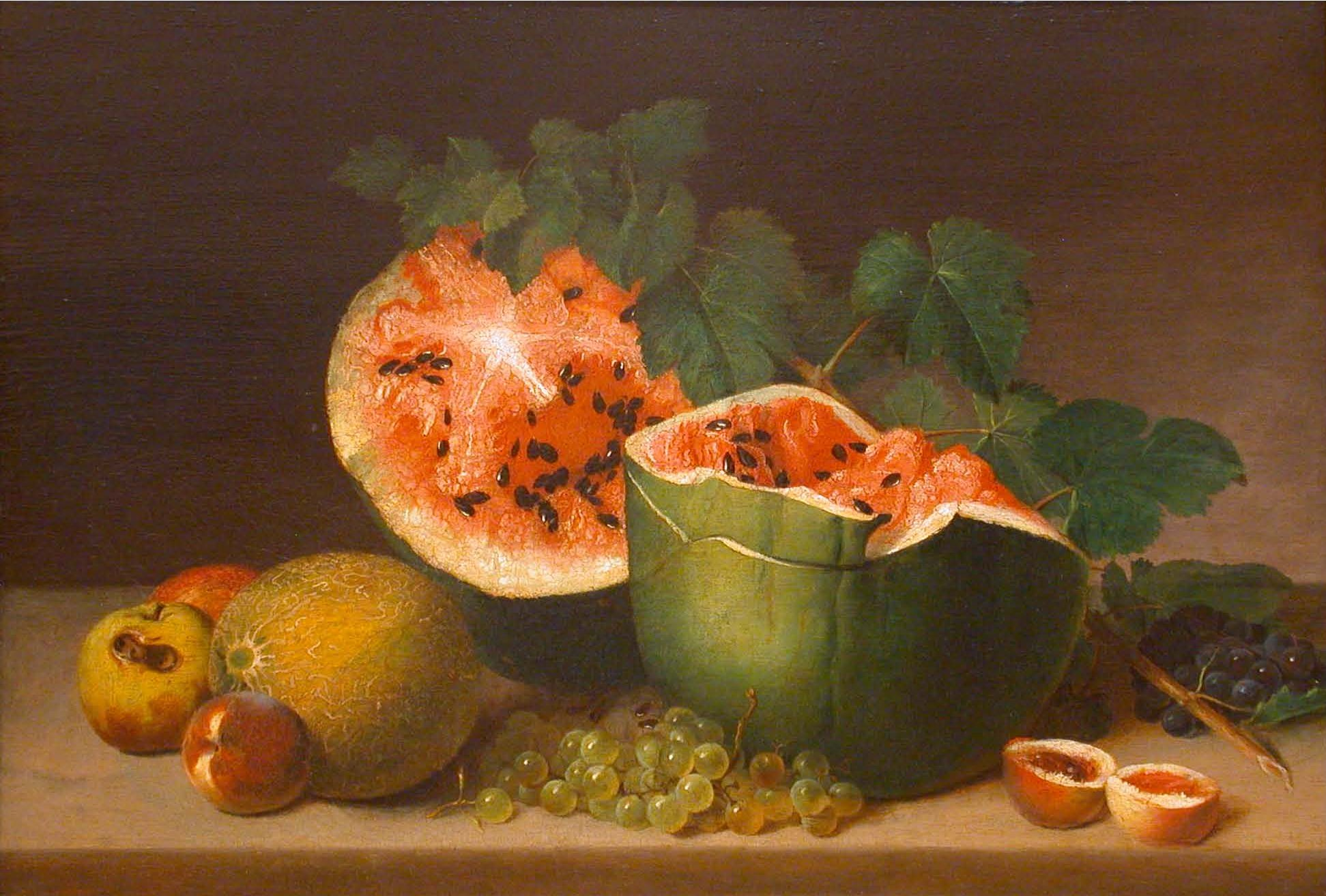
Still Life, oil on panel painting by James Peale, c. 1824, Honolulu Museum of Art

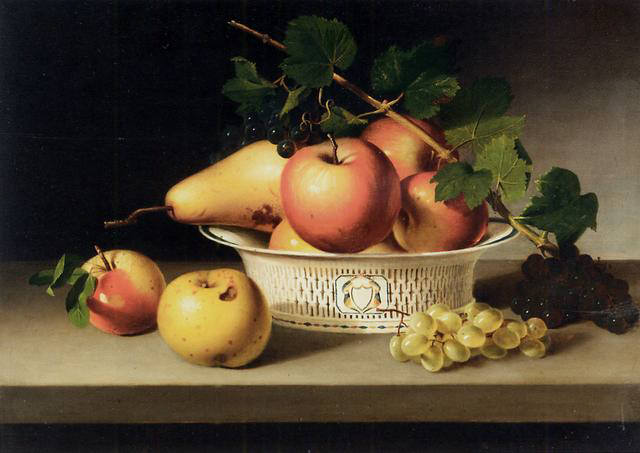
Fruits of Autumn

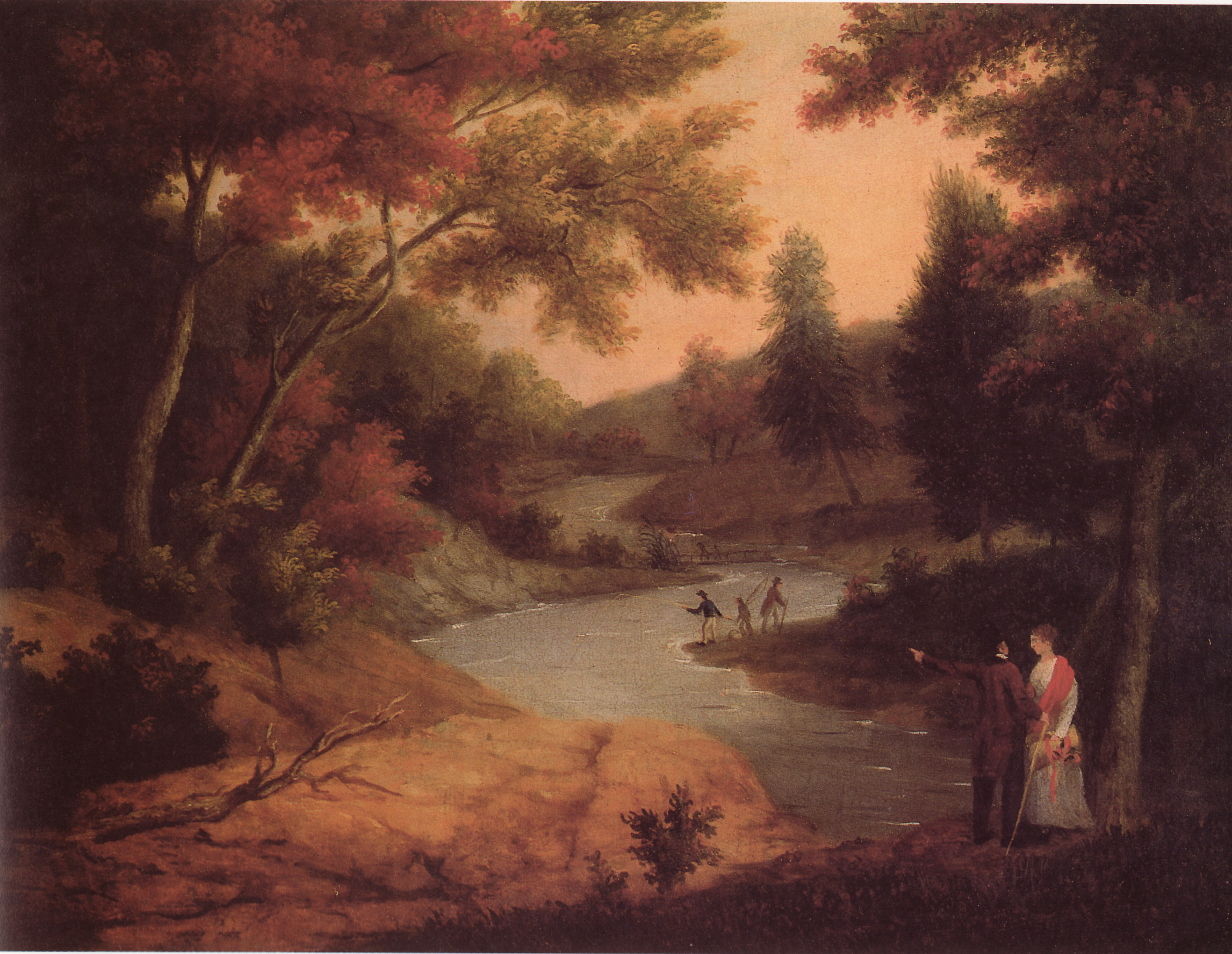
View on the Wissahickon

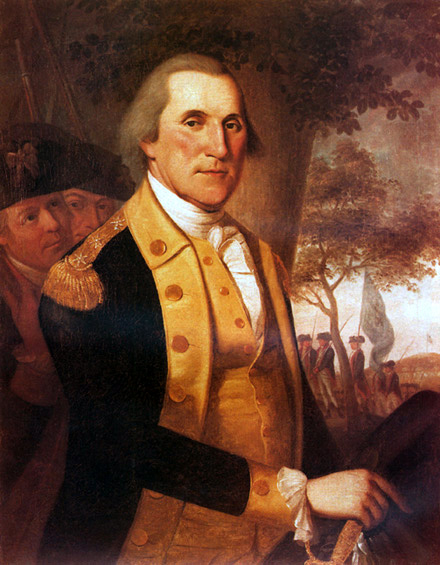
George Washington

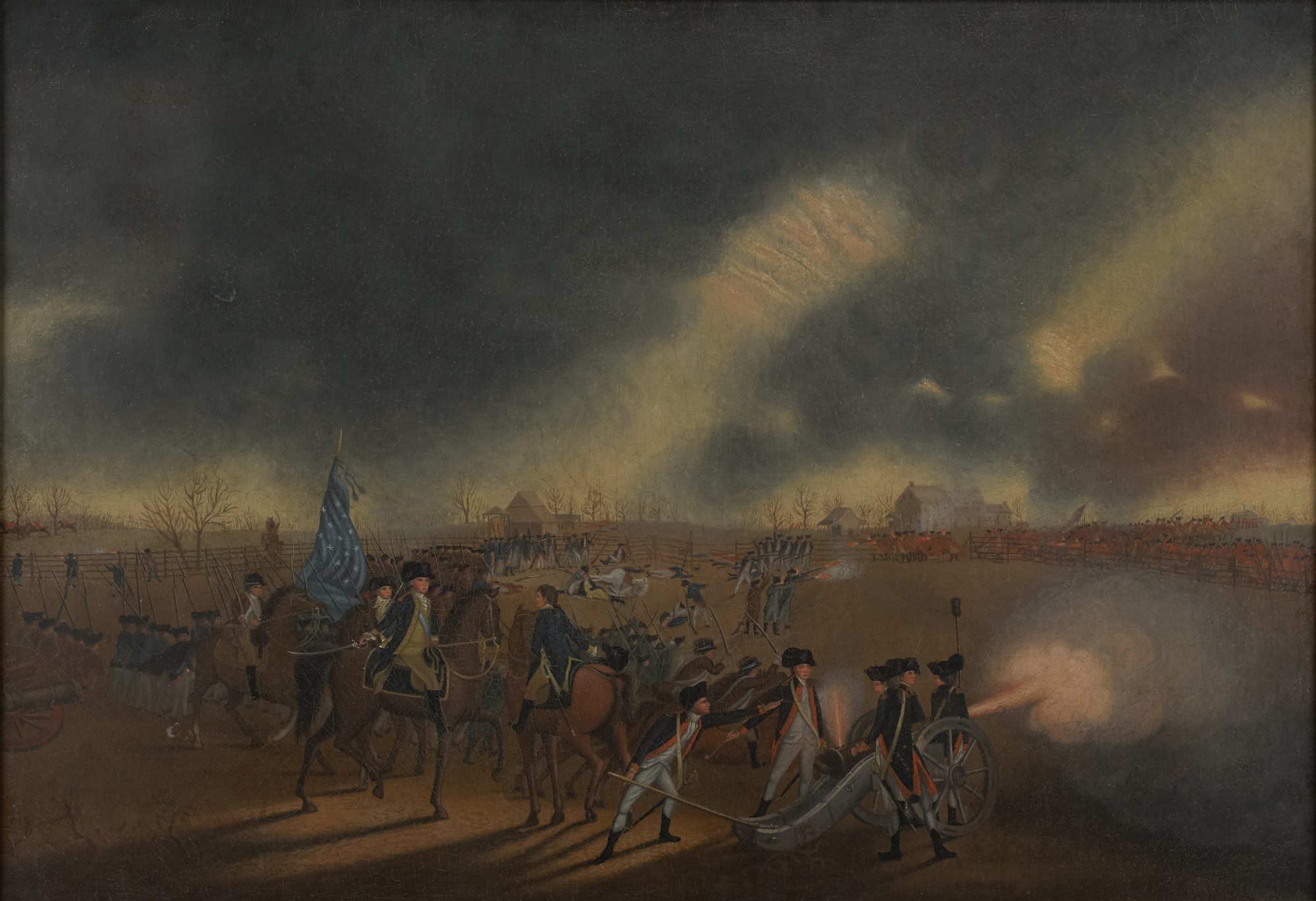
The Battle of Princeton, 1782

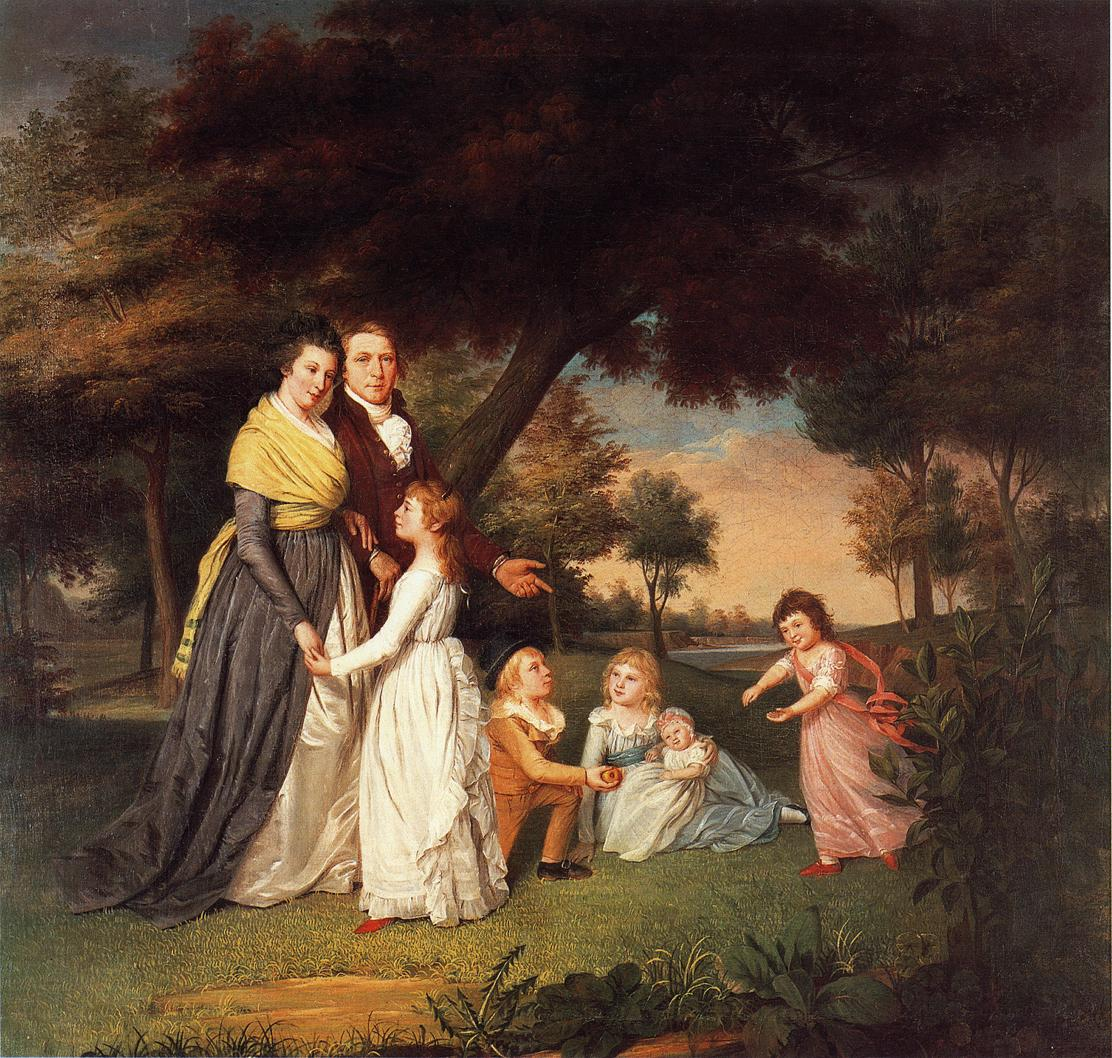
The Artist and His Family, 1795. Pennsylvania Academy of Fine Arts

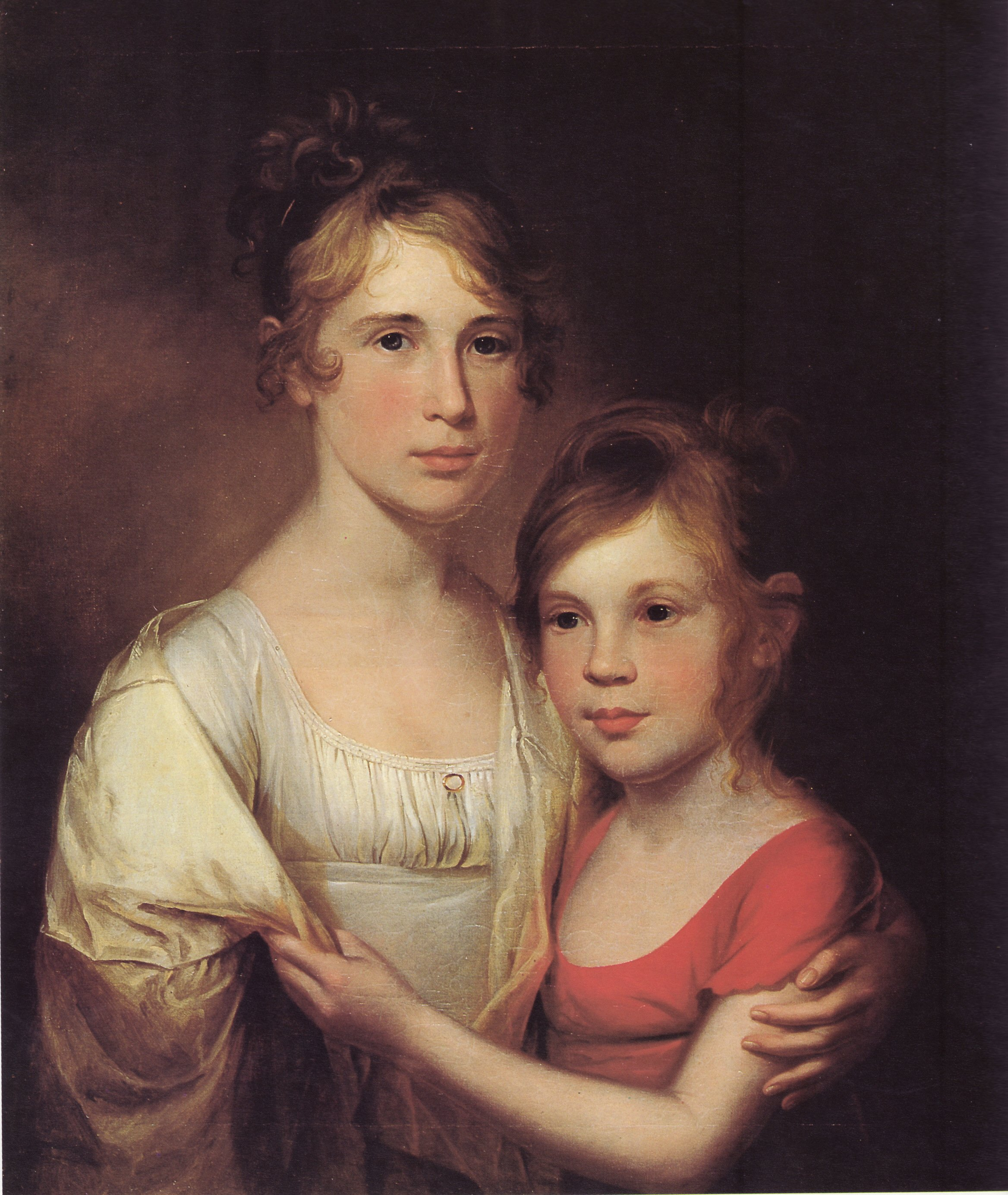
Anna and Margaretta Peale

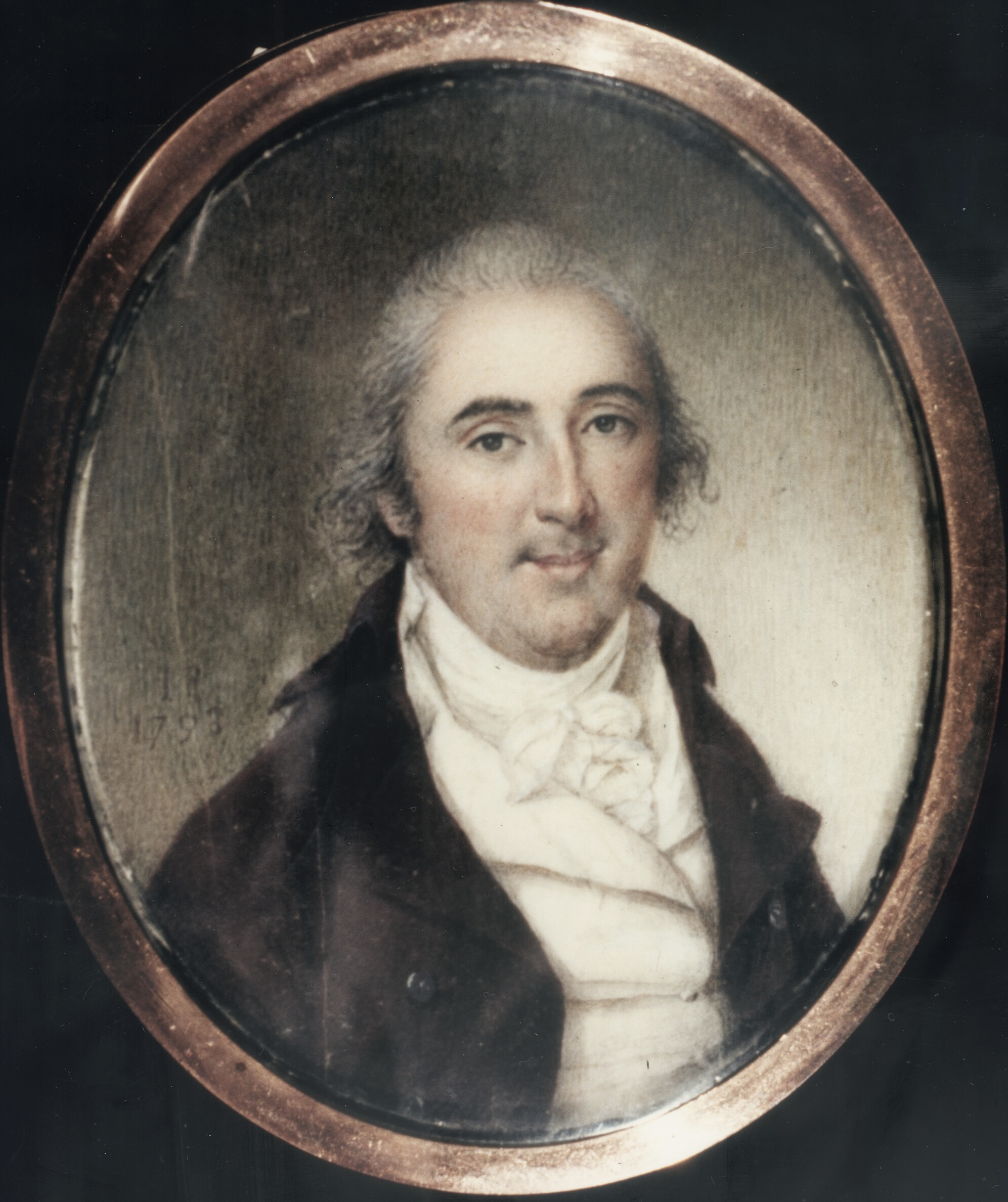
William Marbury, c. 1798

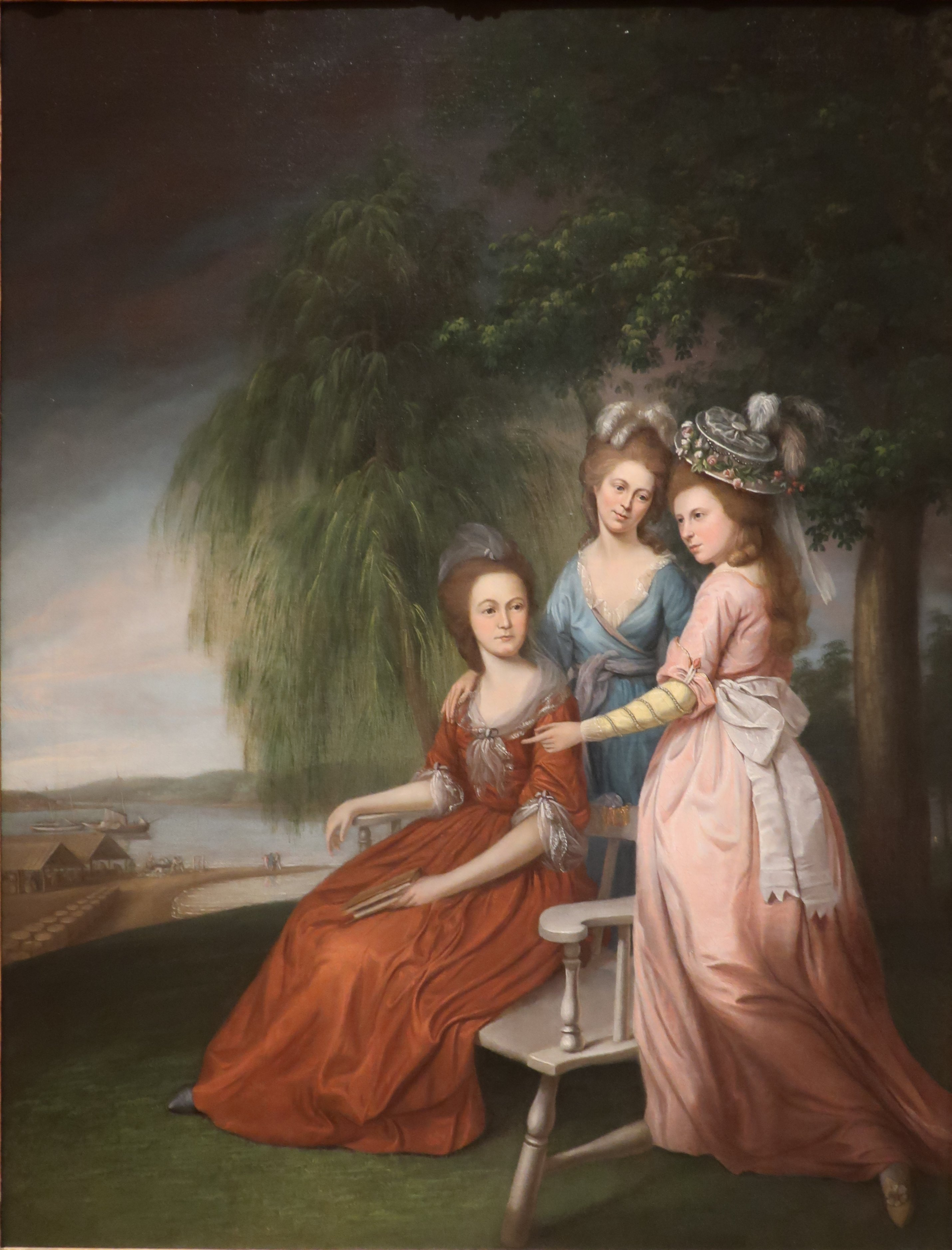
The Ramsay-Polk Family at Carpenter’s Point, Cecil County, Maryland

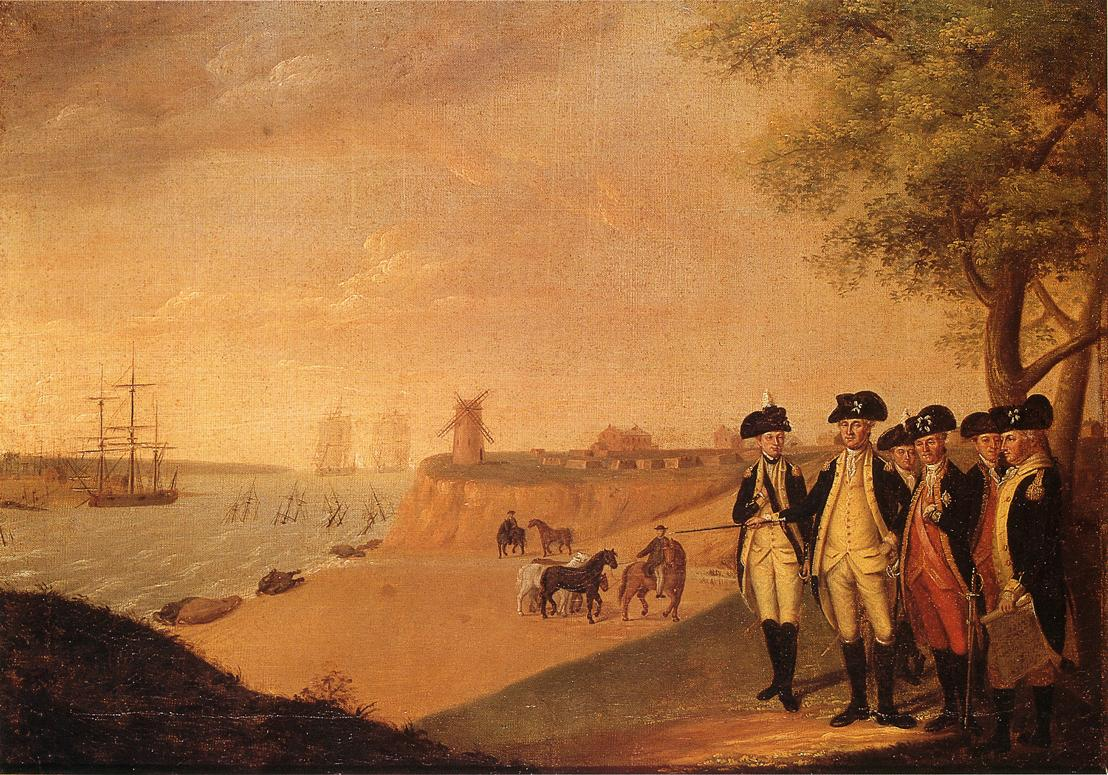
The Generals at Yorktown, Colonial Williamsburg Foundation

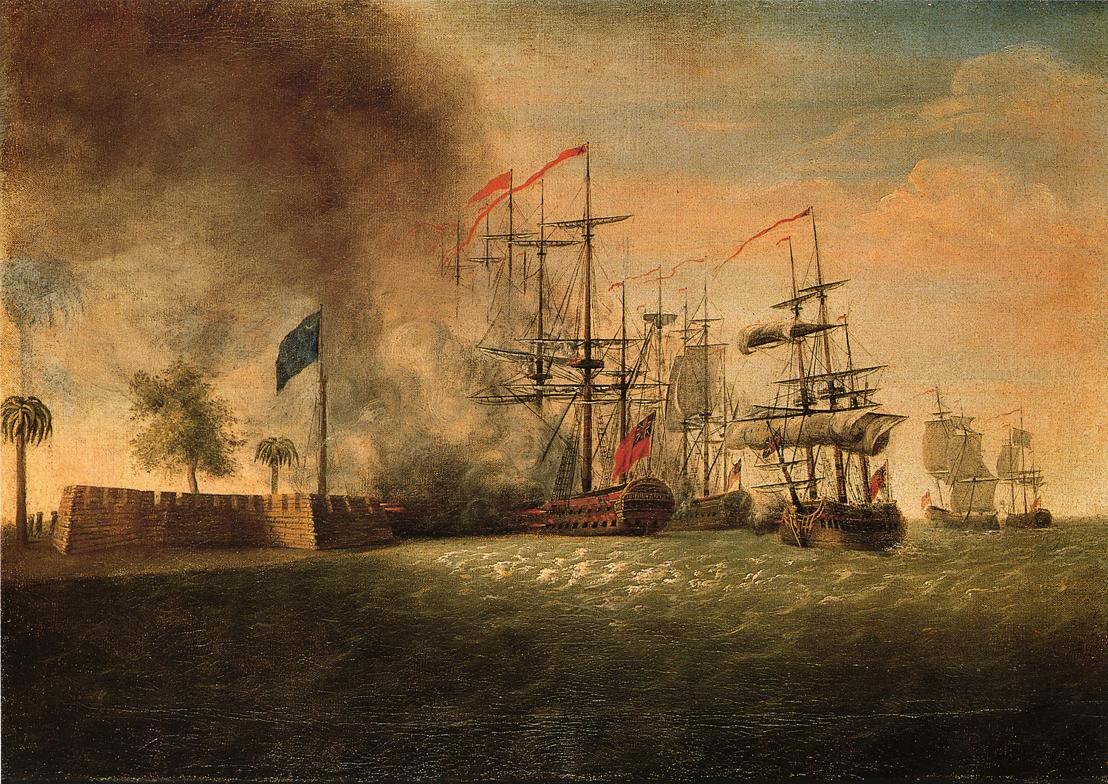
Sir Peter Parker's Attack Against Fort Moultrie, Colonial Williamsburg Foundation

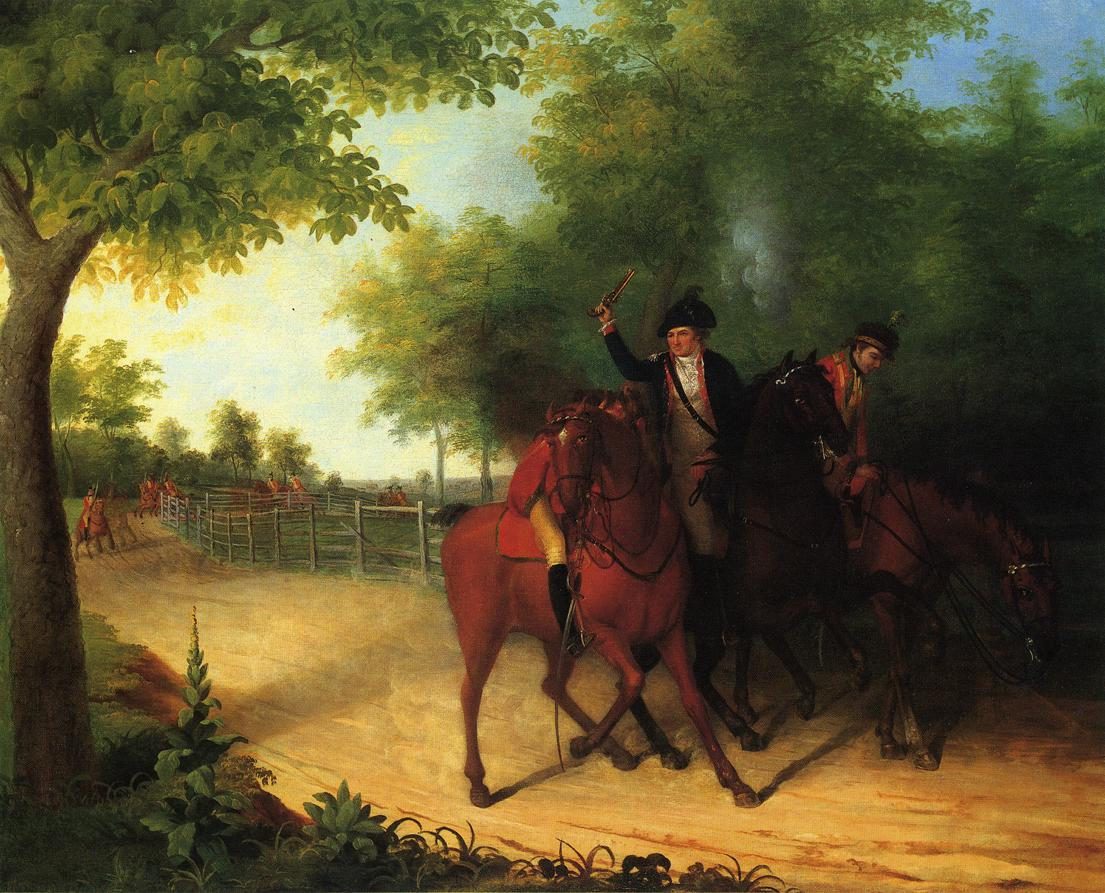
The Ambush of Captain Allan McIane, 1803, Utah Museum of Fine Arts

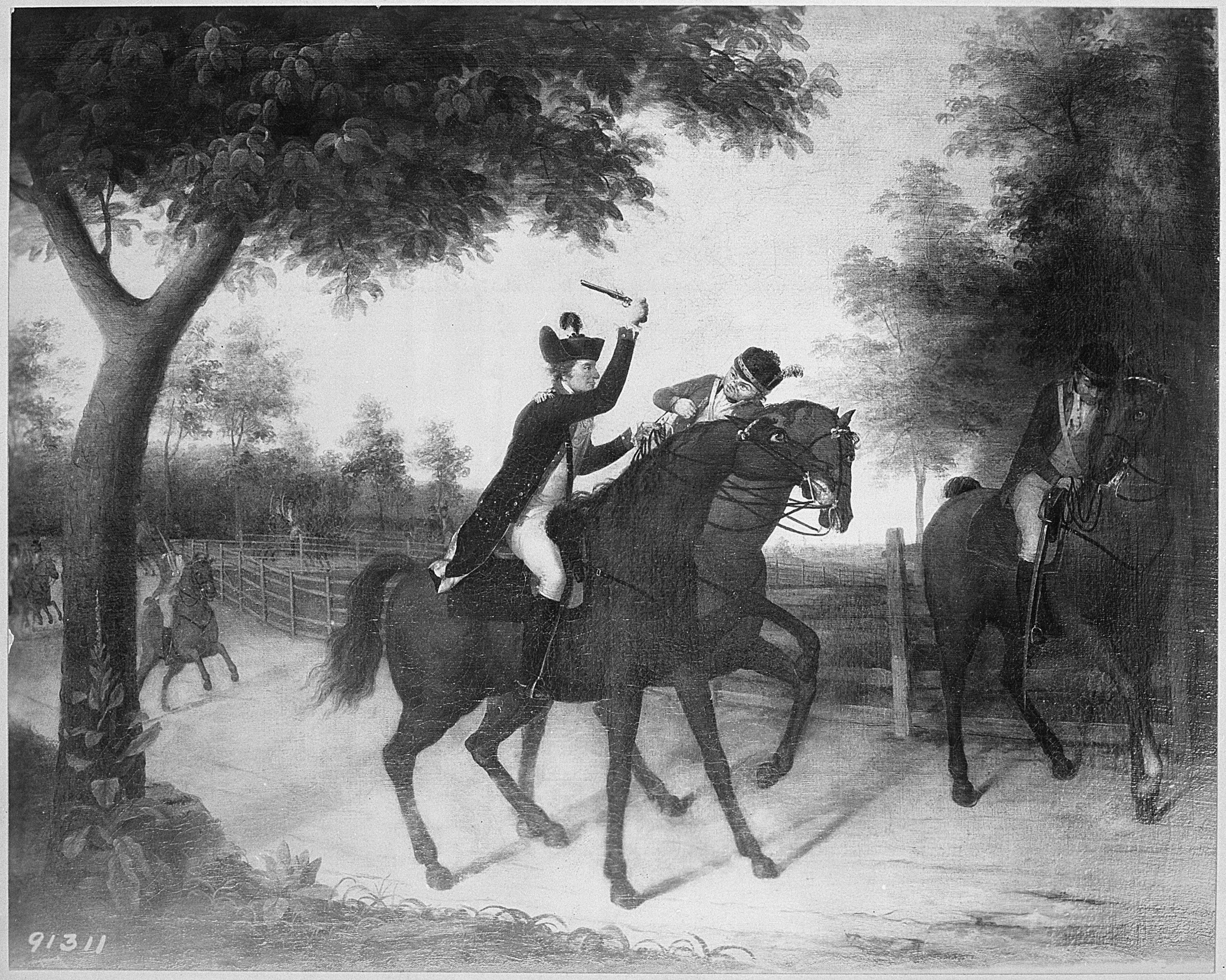
Another version by James Peale's painting of encounter between Allan McLane and British dragoons

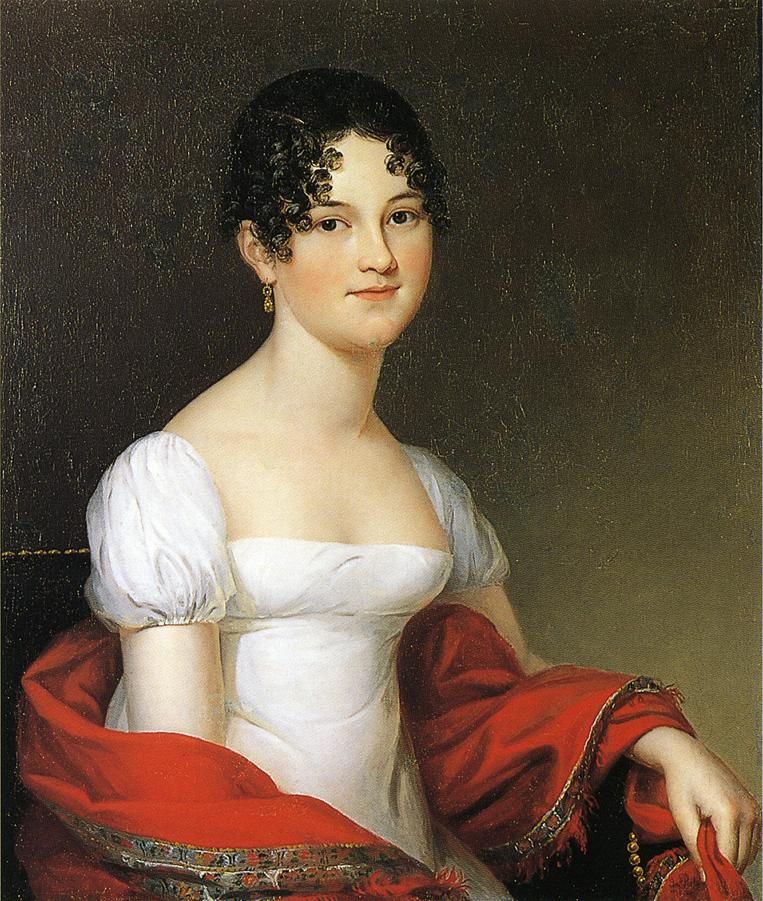
Anna Sophia Alexander Robertson (Mrs. William Theberton), 1816

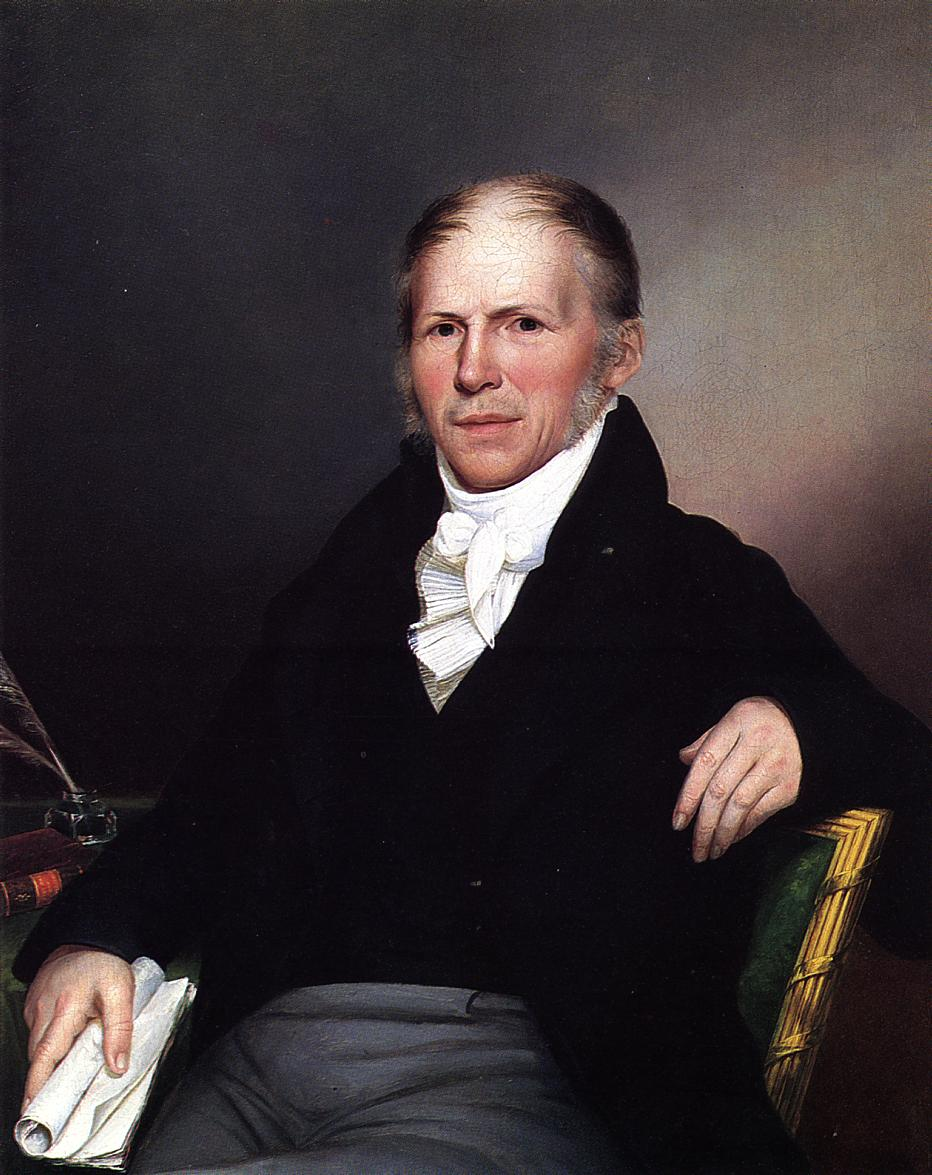
Portrait of William Young, 1817
