= Sarah Miriam Peale =

American painter (1800–1885)

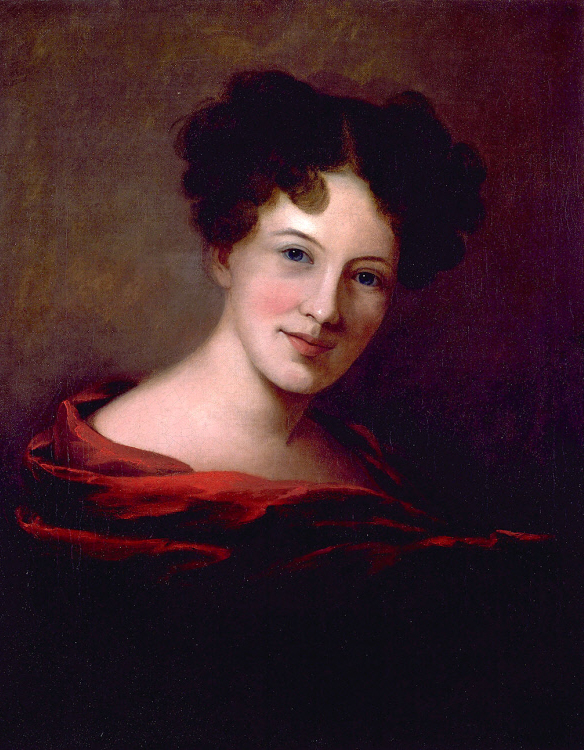
- Self Portrait by Sarah Miriam Peale, 1818
- Born: May 19, 1800; Philadelphia, Pennsylvania, U.S.
- Died: February 4, 1885 (aged 84); Philadelphia, Pennsylvania, U.S.
- Known for: Still life; portraiture

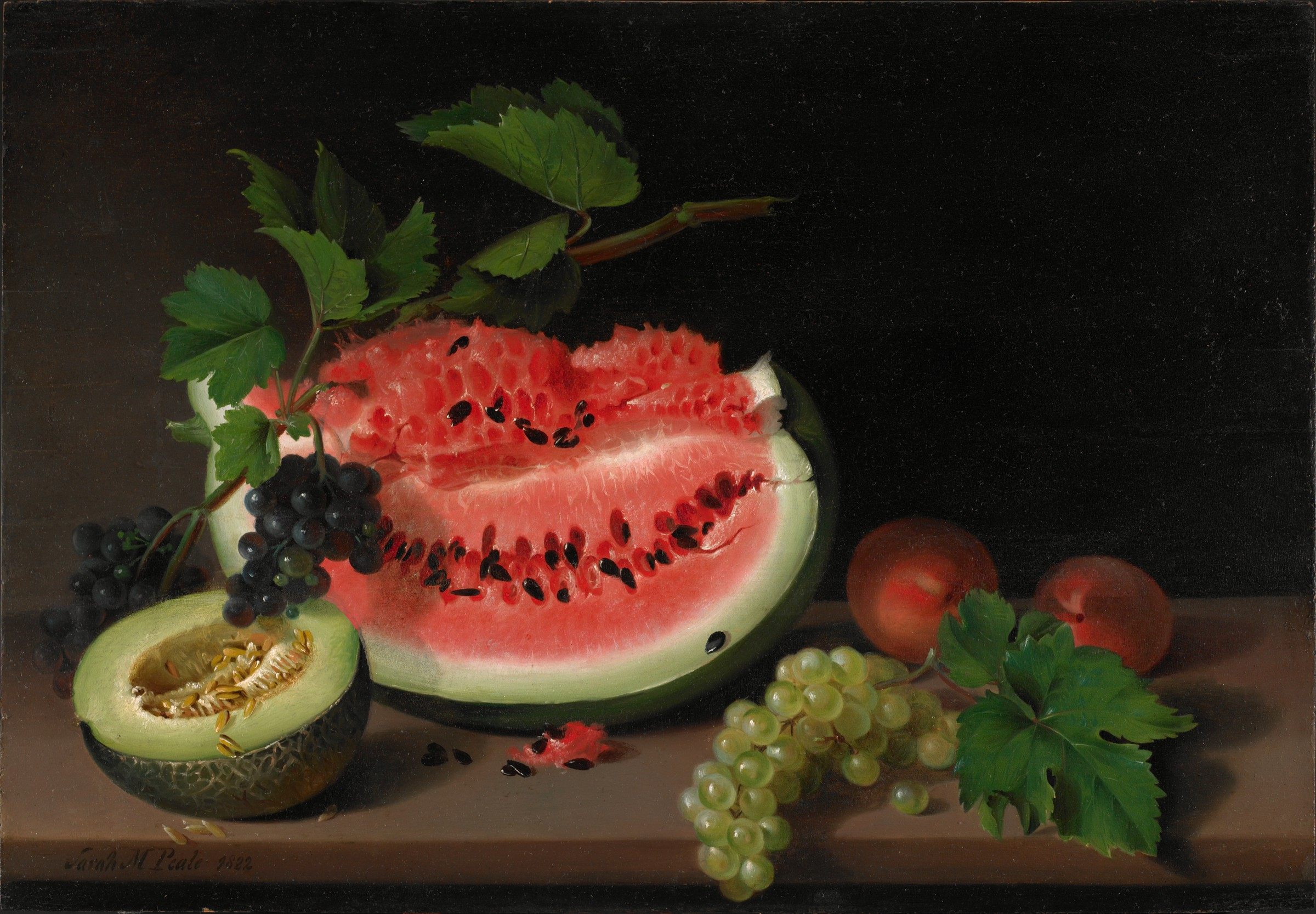
Still Life with Watermelon, 1822

Sarah Miriam Peale (May 19, 1800 – February 4, 1885) was an American portrait painter, considered the first American woman to succeed as a professional artist. One of a family of artists of whom her uncle Charles Willson Peale was the most illustrious, Sarah Peale painted portraits mainly of Maryland, Pennsylvania, and Washington, D.C. notables, politicians, and military figures. Lafayette sat for her four times.

== Life ==
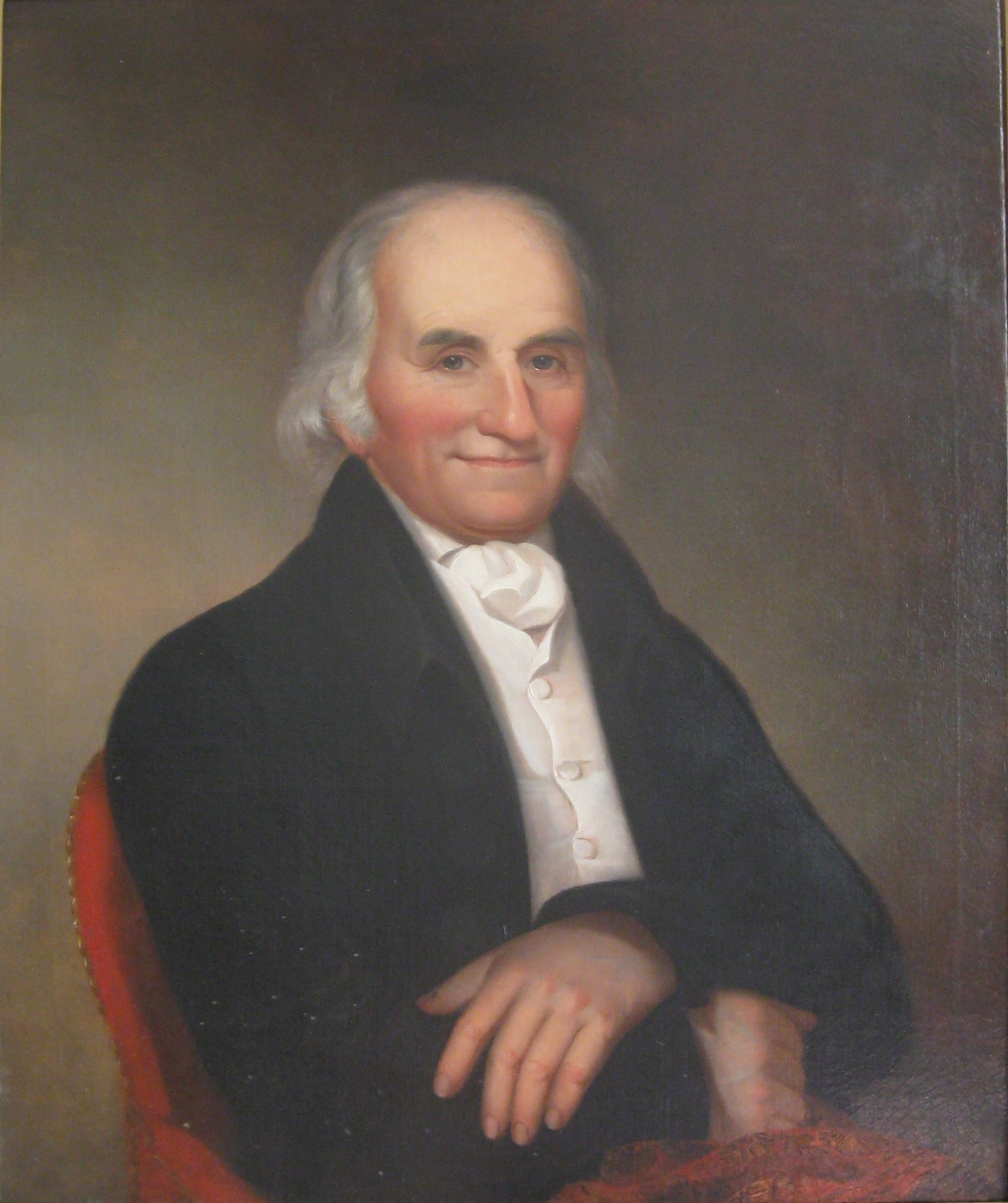
Elijah Bosley (1740–1841), by Sarah Miriam Peale, oil on canvas 73.66 x 62.23cm, c. 1825.

Sarah was born in Philadelphia, Pennsylvania, the youngest daughter of the miniaturist and still-life painter James Peale, younger brother of Charles Willson Peale. Her mother was Miriam Claypoole. Her father and her uncle trained her as an artist, and she served as her father's studio assistant. During her time as a studio assistant, she gained experience in mixing paints, preparing canvases, and delineating backgrounds.

Sarah and her sisters, Anna Claypoole and Margaretta Angelica, were different from the middle-class women of the time, as they experienced schooling, how to be a wife and mother, as well as developed entrepreneurial skills from their family such as art.

As a young girl, she gained experience doing the finishing touches on her father's paintings. Her first public works date from 1816 with subjects such as flowers and still-life, but soon turned to portraiture. In 1818, she spent three months with Rembrandt Peale, her cousin, in Baltimore, and again in 1820 and 1822. He influenced her early painting style and subject matter, as did critic John Neal. For 25 years, she painted in Baltimore (1822–1847) and, intermittently, in Washington, D.C. She attended sessions of Congress, and painted portraits of many public figures.

Sarah first exhibited at the Pennsylvania Academy with Portrait of a Lady (1818). She was accepted to the Pennsylvania Academy of Fine Arts in 1824 along with her sister Anna Claypoole Peale, the first women to achieve this distinction. She opened a studio in Baltimore in 1831. Over 100 commissioned portrait paintings are known from her time in Baltimore. She was known the most prolific artist in the city during that era. Her oil portraits were quickly sought after by congressmen, diplomats, and other wealthy individuals in the Maryland area. Her portrait work is regarded as stylistically unique due to her usage of detailed furs, lace, and fabrics as well as realistic faces, skin, and hair.

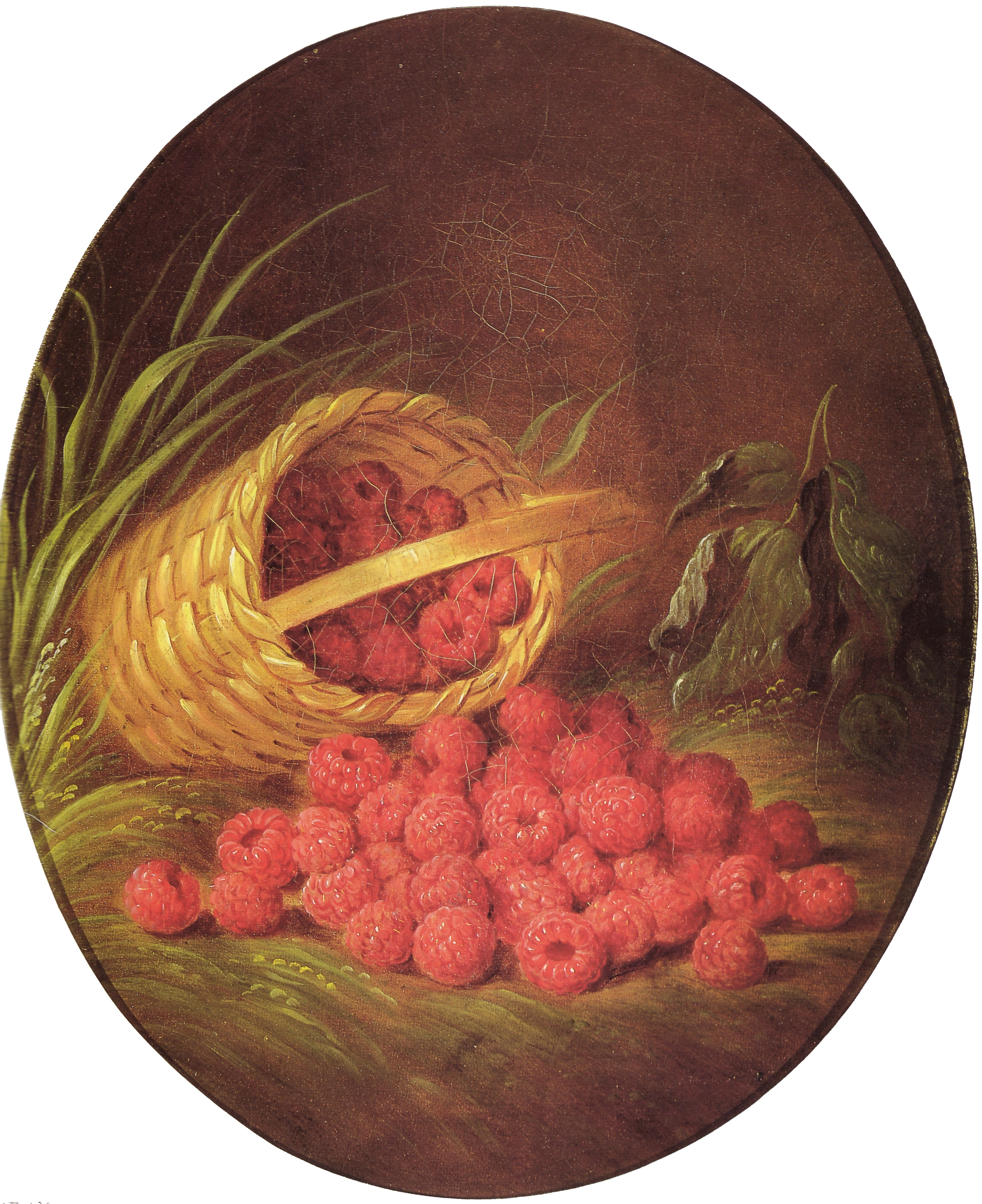
Basket of Berries, 1860

In 1847, ill health caused her to relocate to St. Louis where she became independently successful, one of America's first professional female artists able to earn her living through her work. Most of her work from this era is in private hands. Around 1860, she shifted her subjects from portraits back to still-life, but with a natural arrangement rather that the formal ones of her earlier years.

She returned to her hometown in 1878, living out her last years there with her sisters Anna Claypoole (died 1878) and Margaretta Angelica (died 1882). Like her sister Margaretta, she never married. She died in 1885, aged 85.

Several paintings by Peale were included in the inaugural exhibition of the National Museum of Women in the Arts, American Women Artists 1830-1930, in 1987.

== Works ==
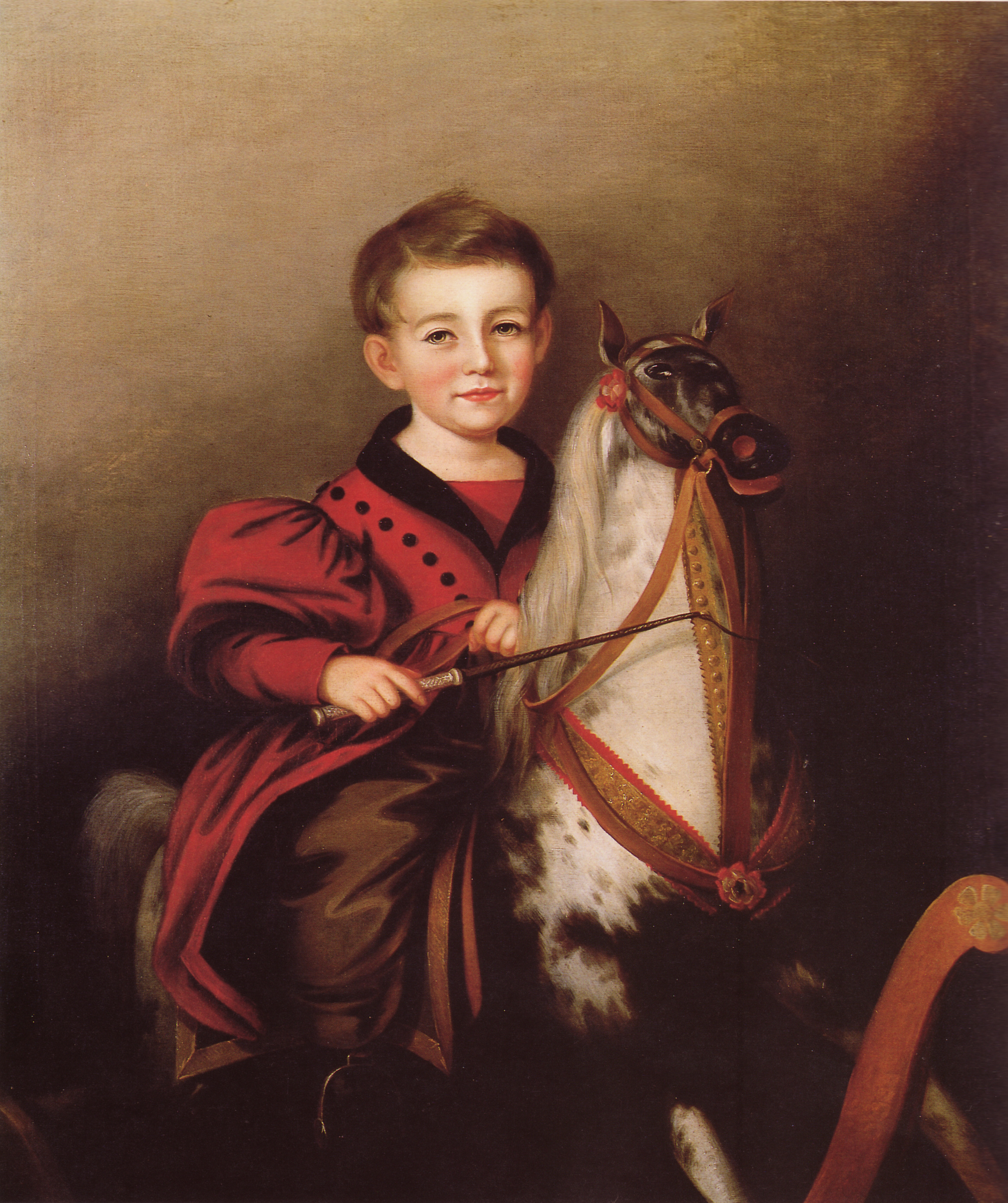
Charles Lavalle Jessop (Boy on a Rocking Horse), 1840. By Sarah Miriam Peale

An incomplete list of exhibited works:

- Self-Portrait, 1818, oil on canvas, 61.2 x 48.3 cm, National Portrait Gallery, Smithsonian Institution, Washington, DC
- Anna Marie Smyth, 1821, oil on canvas, 91.4 x 71.1 cm, Pennsylvania Academy of Fine Arts, Philadelphia
- Susan Avery, 1821, oil on canvas, 89.5 x 69.85 cm, National Museum of Women in the Arts, Washington, DC
- Isaac Avery, 1821, oil on canvas, 89.5 x 69.85 cm, National Museum of Women in the Arts, Washington, DC
- Fruits and Wine, 1822, oil on canvas, 29.8 x 40.6 cm
- John Neal, 1823, oil on canvas, Portland Museum of Art, Portland, Maine
- Mrs. Rubens Peale and Son, 1823, oil on canvas, 76.2 x 60.9 cm, The Peale Museum, Baltimore
- Elijah Bosley (1740–1841) c. 1825, oil on canvas 73.66 cm x 62.23 cm, private collection, Virginia
- José Silvestre Rebello, in 1826, oil on canvas, 70.5 x 89.2 cm, Brazilian Embassy Collection, Washington, DC
- Still Life: Grapes and Watermelon, 1828, oil on canvas, 36.2 x 48.3 cm, Maryland Historical Society, Baltimore
- Peaches and Grapes in a Porcelain Bowl, 1829, oil on canvas, 29.8 x 38.1 cm, Montclair Art Museum, Montclair, New Jersey
- Self-Portrait, 1830, oil on canvas, 68.6 x 50.8 cm, The Peale Museum, Baltimore City Life Museums
- Charles Lavalle Jessop (Boy on a Rocking Horse), 1840, oil on canvas, 90.1 x 106 cm
- Mrs. William Crane, 1840, 75,6 x 62,9 cm, San Diego Museum of Art, California
- Charlotte Ramsay Bobinson, 1840, oil on canvas, oval, 96.5 x 66 cm, The Peale Museum, Baltimore City Life Museums
- Henry Alexander Wise, 1842, oil on canvas, 74.9 x 62.2 cm, Virginia Museum of Fine Arts, Richmond
- Senator Thomas Hart Benton, 1842, oil on canvas, 76.2 x 63.5 cm, Missouri Historical Society, Saint Louis
- Basket of Berries, 1860, oil on canvas, oval, 30.5 x 25.4 cm
- Senator Lewis Fields Linn, oil on canvas, Missouri Historical Society, Saint Louis

== Awards ==
- Academician, Pennsylvania Academy of the Fine Arts, Philadelphia, Pennsylvania, USA (1824)
