= List of painters by name beginning with "P" =

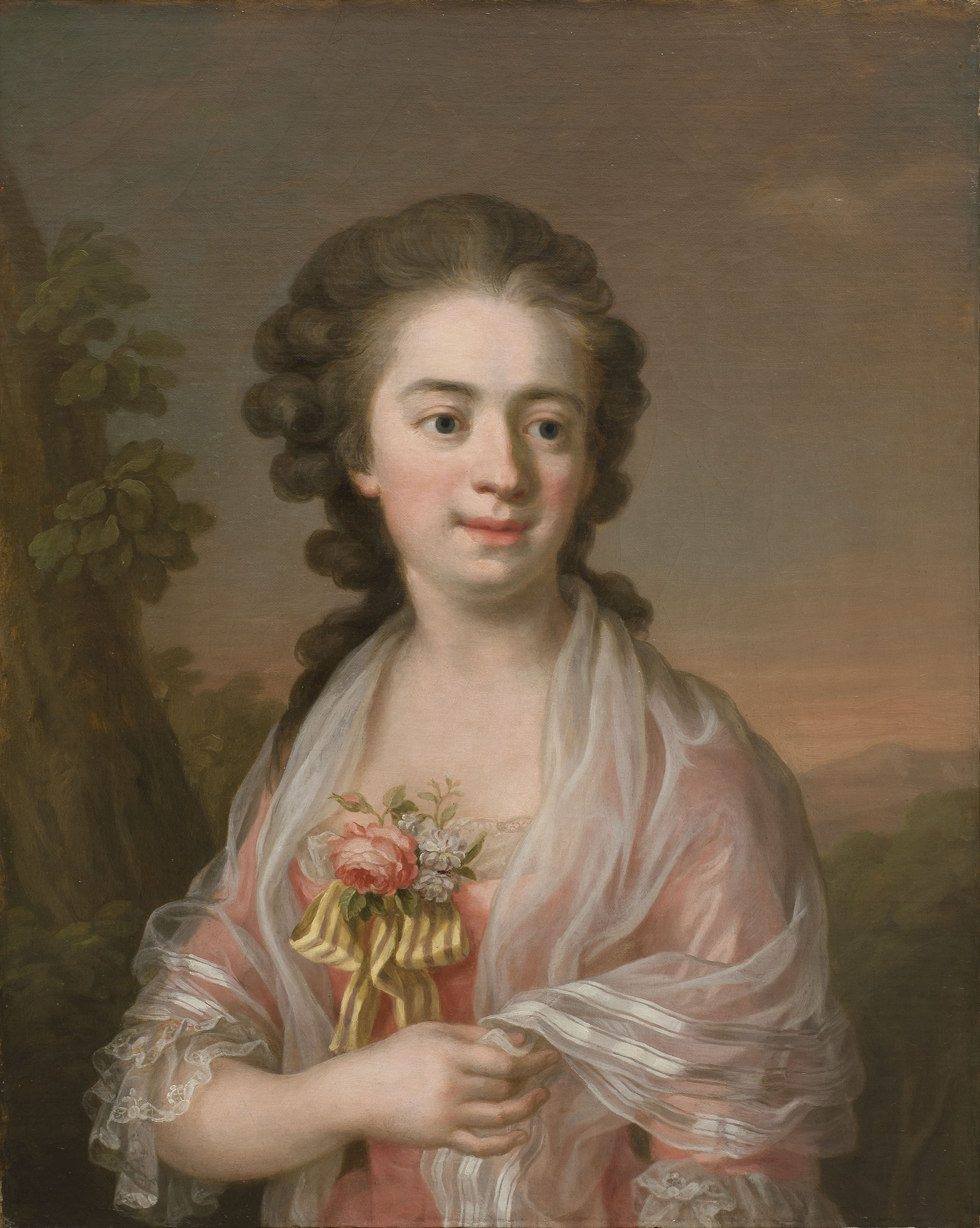
Ulrika Pasch

Please add names of notable painters with a Wikipedia page, in precise English alphabetical order, using U.S. spelling conventions. Country and regional names refer to where painters worked for long periods, not to personal allegiances.

- László Paál (1846–1879), Hungarian painter
- Stephen Pace (1918–2010), American artist
- T. K. Padmini (1940–1969), Indian painter
- Grace Pailthorpe (1883–1971), English surrealist painter
- Anthonie Palamedesz. (1601–1673), Dutch painter
- Maties Palau Ferré (1921–2000), Spanish (Catalonian) painter, draftsman, and ceramicist
- Béla Pállik (1845–1908), Hungarian painter and opera singer
- Kalervo Palsa (1947–1987), Finnish artist
- Tom Palin (born 1974), English painter
- Pamphilus (4th century BC), Ancient Greek painter
- Arthur Pan (fl. 1920–1960), Hungarian/English portrait painter
- Pan Tianshou (潘天壽, 1897–1971), Chinese painter and educator
- Pan Yuliang (潘玉良, 1899–1977), Chinese painter
- Giovanni Paolo Pannini (1691–1765), Italian painter and architect
- Józef Pankiewicz (1866–1940), Polish/French painter, graphic artist, and teacher
- Eduardo Paolozzi (1924–2005), Scottish artist and sculptor
- George Papazov (1894–1972), Bulgarian/French painter and writer
- Roberto Parada (born 1969), an American painter
- David Park (1911–1960), American painter
- Constance-Anne Parker (1921–2016), English painter and sculptor
- John Parker (1798–1860), Welsh artist and cleric
- Lawton S. Parker (1868–1954), American painter
- Ray Parker (1922–1990), American painter
- Parmigianino (1503–1540), Italian painter and print-maker
- Antônio Parreiras (1860–1937), Brazilian painter, designer, and illustrator
- Clara Weaver Parrish (1861–1925), American painter and stained-glass designer
- Maxfield Parrish (1870–1966), American painter and illustrator
- Ulrika Pasch (1735–1796), Swedish painter and miniaturist
- Ed Paschke (1939–2004), American painter
- Jules Pascin (1885–1930), Bulgarian/American painter and draftsman
- Odhise Paskali (1903–1985), Albanian sculptor
- Pasquarosa (1896–1973), Italian painter
- Leonid Pasternak (1862–1945), Russian/Soviet painter
- Jean-Baptiste Pater (1695–1736), French painter
- Emily Murray Paterson (1855–1934), Scottish painter
- James Paterson (1854–1932), Scottish painter
- Viola Paterson (1899–1981), Scottish/English painter, engraver, and woodcut artist
- Joachim Patinir (1480–1524), Flemish painter
- Károly Patkó (1895–1941), Hungarian painter and copper engraver
- David Paton (fl. 1660–1700), Scottish miniature painter
- Joseph Noel Paton (1821–1901), Scottish artist, illustrator, and sculptor
- James McIntosh Patrick (1907–1998), Scottish painter
- Ambrose McCarthy Patterson (1877–1967), Australian/American painter and print-maker
- Gen Paul (1898–1975), French painter and engraver
- William McGregor Paxton (1869–1941), American painter and instructor
- Charles Willson Peale (1741–1827), American painter, soldier, and naturalist
- James Peale (1749–1831), American painter
- Raphaelle Peale (1774–1825), American still-life painter
- Rembrandt Peale (1778–1860), American artist and museum founder
- Rubens Peale (1784–1865), American artist and museum curator
- Titian Peale (1799–1885), American artist, naturalist, and explorer
- Max Pechstein (1881–1955), German painter and print-maker
- Carl-Henning Pedersen (1913–2007), Danish painter
- Pedro Pedraja (born 1974), Spanish/English painter
- Olivia Peguero (born 1963), Dominican painter and botanic artist
- Lucia Peka (1912–1991), Latvian/American artist
- Waldo Peirce (1884–1970), American painter
- Slobodan Pejić (1944–2006), Yugoslav (Bosnian)/Slovenian sculptor and painter
- Amelia Peláez (1896–1968), Cuban painter
- Fernand Pelez (1843–1913), French painter
- Gina Pellón (1926–2014), Cuban/French painter
- Agnes Lawrence Pelton (1881–1961), American painter
- Sophie Pemberton (1869–1959), Canadian painter
- Giovanni Pelliccioli (born 1947), an Italian painter
- Relja Penezic (born 1950), Yugoslav (Serbian)/American painter, print-maker and film-maker
- Vincent Pepi (1926–2020), American painter
- Samuel Peploe (1871–1935), Scottish painter
- Matteo Pérez (c. 1547 – c. 1616), Italian painter
- Christopher Perkins (1891–1968), English/New Zealand painter and teacher
- Constant Permeke (1886–1952), Belgian painter and sculptor
- Vasily Perov (1833–1882), Russian painter
- Lilla Cabot Perry (1848–1933), American artist
- Pietro Perugino (c. 1445 – 1523), Italian painter
- Robert Storm Petersen (1882–1949), Danish cartoonist, illustrator, and painter
- Jean Petitot (1607–1691), Swiss/French enamel painter
- Jean Louis Petitot (1652–1730), French enamel painter
- Roy Petley (born 1951), English painter
- John F. Peto (1854–1907), American painter
- Soma Orlai Petrich (1822–1880), Hungarian painter
- Wolfgang Petrick (1939–2025), German painter, graphic artist and sculptor
- Giuseppe Antonio Petrini (1677–1755), Swiss painter
- John Pettie (1839–1893), Scottish/English painter
- Valerie Petts (living), English painter
- Peter S. Pezzati (1902–1993), American painter
- Erik Pevernagie (born 1939), Belgian painter and writer
- Theodor Philipsen (1840–1920), Danish painter and figure-maker
- Ammi Phillips (1788–1865), American painter
- L. Vance Phillips (1858 – pre-1951), American china painter
- Tom Phillips (1937–2022), English painter, print-maker and collagist
- Ramón Piaguaje (born 1962), Ecuadorian painter and environmentalist
- Giovanni Battista Piazzetta (1682–1754), Italian painter
- Francis Picabia (1879–1953), French painter, poet, and typographer
- Pablo Picasso (1881–1973), Spanish/French painter, sculptor and ceramicist
- Ramon Pichot (1871–1925), Spanish (Catalan) painter
- Nicolaes Eliaszoon Pickenoy (1588–1655), Dutch painter
- Joseph Pickett (1848–1918), American painter
- Otto Piene (1928–2014), German/American artist
- Patrick Pietropoli (born 1953), French painter and sculptor
- André Pijet (living), Polish/French cartoonist
- Adam Pijnacker (1622–1673), Dutch painter
- Otto Pilny (1866–1936), Swiss painter
- Carl Gustaf Pilo (1711–1793), Swedish/Danish artist and academy director
- Veno Pilon (1896–1970), Yugoslav/Slovenian painter, graphic artist and photographer
- Robert Antoine Pinchon (1886–1943), French painter
- Howardena Pindell (born 1943), American painter and mixed-media artist
- Mira Pintar (1891–1980), Slovenian artist and art collector
- Xavier Blum Pinto (born 1957), Ecuadorian artist
- Grytė Pintukaitė (born 1977), Soviet/Lithuanian painter
- Pinturicchio (c. 1454 – 1513), Italian painter
- Richard Pionk (1936–2007), American painter
- George Pirie (1863–1946), Scottish painter and draftsman
- Pisanello (c. 1395 – 1455), Italian painter
- Joseph Pisani (born 1971), American painter and photographer
- Camille Pissarro (1830–1903), Danish/French painter
- Lucien Pissarro (1863–1944), English painter and etcher
- Orovida Camille Pissarro (1893–1968), English painter and etcher
- Primrose Pitman (1902–1998), English painter and draftsman
- Lari Pittman (born 1952), American painter
- Giambattista Pittoni (1687–1767) Italian painter and academician
- Antoni Pitxot (1934–2015) Spanish (Catalan) painter
- Otto Placht (born 1962) Czechoslovak/Peruvian painter
- Josefina Tanganelli Plana (1904–1968), Spanish (Catalan) cartoonist and painter
- Ervin Plány (1885–1916), Hungarian painter
- John Platt (1886–1967), English painter
- John Plumb (1927–2008), English painter
- Władysław Podkowiński (1866–1895), Polish painter and illustrator
- Ihor Podolchak (born 1962), Soviet/Ukrainian film-maker and visual artist
- Egbert van der Poel (1621–1664), Dutch painter
- Cornelis van Poelenburgh (1594–1667), Dutch painter and draftsman
- Louis Pohl (1915–1999), American painter, illustrator and art teacher
- Vasily Polenov (1844–1927), Russian painter
- Serge Poliakoff (1900–1969), Russian/French painter
- Sigmar Polke (1941–2010), German painter and photographer
- Jackson Pollock (1912–1956), American painter
- Elizabeth Polunin (1887–1950), English artist and theater designer
- Fay Pomerance (1912–2001), English painter
- Jacopo Pontormo (1494–1557), Italian painter
- Horatio Nelson Poole (1884–1949), American painter, print-maker and teacher
- Willem de Poorter (1608–1648), Dutch painter
- Liubov Popova (1889–1924), Russian painter and designer
- Bertalan Pór (1880–1964), Hungarian painter
- Fairfield Porter (1907–1975), American painter and art critic
- Candido Portinari (1903–1962), Brazilian painter
- Marten Post (born 1942), Dutch visual artist
- Hendrik Gerritsz Pot (1580–1657), Dutch painter
- Beatrix Potter (1866–1943), English children's author and illustrator
- Paulus Potter (1625–1654), Dutch painter
- Fuller Potter (1910–1990), American artist
- Edward Henry Potthast (1857–1927), American painter
- William Didier-Pouget (1864–1959), French painter
- Nathaniel Pousette-Dart (1886–1965), American painter and art writer
- Richard Pousette-Dart (1916–1992), American painter, sculptor and photographer
- Nicolas Poussin (1594–1665), French/Italian painter
- William Powhida (born 1976), American visual artist and art critic
- Domenico Pozzi (1745–1796), Italian painter
- Andrea Pozzo (1642–1709), Italian painter, architect and Jesuit
- Harvey Pratt (1941–2025), American forensic artist
- Fred A. Precht (1863–1942), American painter
- Maurice Prendergast (1861–1924), American artist
- Peter Prendergast (1946–2007), Welsh landscape painter
- Gregorio Prestopino (1907–1984), American artist
- Gaetano Previati (1852–1920), Italian painter
- Mary Elizabeth Price (1877–1965), American painter
- Gwilym Prichard (1931–2015), Welsh painter
- Alice Prin (1901–1953), French painter, model and actress
- John Quinton Pringle (1864–1925), Scottish painter
- Dod Procter (1890–1972), English painter
- Ernest Procter (1885–1935), English painter, designer and illustrator
- František Jakub Prokyš (1713–1791), Austro-Hungarian (Bohemian) painter
- Andrzej Pronaszko (1888–1961), Polish painter and scenographer
- Samuel Prout (1783–1852), English watercolor painter
- John Skinner Prout (1805–1876), English/Australian painter, lithographer and art teacher
- Tadeusz Pruszkówski (1888–1942), Polish painter and art teacher
- Witold Pruszkówski (1846–1896), Polish painter and graphic artist
- Illarion Pryanishnikov (1840–1894), Russian painter
- Pu Hua (蒲華, 1834–1911), Chinese painter and calligrapher
- Louisa Puller (1884–1963), English painter and wartime artist
- Puru (溥儒, 1896–1963), Chinese painter and calligrapher
- Fritz Puempin (1901–1972), Swiss painter and archaeologist
- Johann Pucher (1814–1864), Austro-Hungarian (Slovenian) artist, poet and priest
- Karl Pümpin (1907–1975), Swiss painter
- Hovsep Pushman (1877–1966), Armenian/American painter
- Sasha Putrya (1977–1989), Soviet (Ukrainian) child artist
- Patrick Pye (1929–2018), Irish sculptor, painter and stained-glass artist
- Jacob Pynas (1592–1650), Dutch painter
- Jan Pynas (1583–1667), Dutch painter
