= Joanna Pousette-Dart =

American visual artist (born 1947)

- Born: 1947 (age 78–79); New York City, New York, U.S
- Education: Bennington College
- Known for: Painting, drawing
- Style: Abstract
- Spouse: David Novros
- Awards: John S. Guggenheim Fellowship, American Academy of Arts and Letters, National Endowment for the Arts
- Website: Joanna Pousette-Dart

Joanna Pousette-Dart (born 1947) is an American abstract artist, based in New York City. She is best known for her distinctive shaped-canvas paintings, which typically consist of two or three stacked, curved-edge planes whose arrangements—from slightly precarious to nested—convey a sense of momentary balance with the potential to rock, tilt or slip. She overlays the planes with meandering, variable arabesque lines that delineate interior shapes and contours, often echoing the curves of the supports. Her work draws on diverse inspirations, including the landscapes of the American Southwest, Islamic, Mozarabic and Catalan art, Chinese landscape painting and calligraphy, and Mayan art, as well as early and mid-20th-century modernism. Critic John Yau writes that her shaped canvasses explore "the meeting place between abstraction and landscape, quietly expanding on the work of predecessors" (such as Ellsworth Kelly), through a combination of personal geometry and linear structure that creates "a sense of constant and latent movement."

Joanna Pousette-Dart, 3 Part Variation #7, acrylic on canvas on wood panels, 67" x 93", 2012–3.

Pousette-Dart has been recognized with a Guggenheim Fellowship and awards from the American Academy of Arts and Letters and National Endowment for the Arts, and is represented in the collections of the Museum of Modern Art (MoMA), Solomon R. Guggenheim Museum and Brooklyn Museum, among others. She has exhibited internationally, at institutions including MoMA, the Whitney Museum of American Art, MoMA PS1, Museum Wiesbaden, and Museum of Fine Arts, Boston. Pousette-Dart is the daughter of abstract-expressionist painter and New York School founding member Richard Pousette-Dart. She lives and works in SoHo, Manhattan with her husband, painter David Novros, with whom she has a son, Jason.

== Early life and career ==
Pousette-Dart was born in New York City in 1947 to poet Evelyn Gracey and painter Richard Pousette-Dart; her grandparents, Flora and Nathaniel Pousette-Dart, were, respectively, a poet and musician and a painter. Pousette-Dart studied art at Bennington College (BA, 1968), then heavily tilted toward the post-painterly, 1960s abstraction advocated by Clement Greenberg and faculty such as the Color field painters Kenneth Noland, Jules Olitski and Larry Poons. Her dissatisfaction with a purely formalist approach to painting led her to seek out New York artists who explored paintings as objects rather than illusionistic devices.

After graduating, Pousette-Dart took on various jobs and painted in her off-time, before accepting a teaching position at Ramapo College in 1972. In 1973, she was included in the Whitney Biennial, and over the next decade, group exhibitions at MoMA, Indianapolis Museum of Art, and Danforth Art Museum (the traveling show "Abstract Painting Revisited," 1985–6). She held solo exhibitions at the Susan Caldwell Gallery in New York (1974–83) and Janus Gallery (Los Angeles 1981). During that time, Pousette-Dart lived and worked intermittently in New Mexico; her experience of the vast expanses of the landscape has had a profound influence on her work from the 1990s onward.

In her later career, Pousette-Dart has had solo exhibitions at the Charles Cowles, Moti Hasson and Lisson galleries in New York, Texas Gallery (Houston), Museum Wiesbaden (Germany), and Locks Gallery (Philadelphia), as well as a three-person exhibition at MoMA PS1, among others. She has also held teaching positions at Hunter College (1986–99) and New York Studio School, as well as guest artist positions at a variety of institutions including Yale University.

== Artwork and reception ==
Joanna Pousette-Dart, Untitled #7, sand and acrylic on canvas, 7' x 14', 1976.

Pousette-Dart's work has eluded any group aesthetic, geographic or other label, or particular set of theories. Robert Pincus-Witten and John Yau suggest that her work extends the modernist vocabulary into new territory through its reimagining of the straight lines, idealized shapes and rigid rectangular format of hard-edged abstraction. Barbara Rose describes Pousette-Dart's shaped canvasses as developing out of a "poetic sense and personal reaction to sensory experience," which renders them unique in their emphasis on movement and the creation of a panoramic spatial continuum; she and others distinguish this more intuitive, eccentric approach from the more programmatic strategies of other shaped-canvas proponents, such as Frank Stella.

=== Early painting (1974–1992) ===
Ken Johnson has described Pousette-Dart's early artwork as focused on a dualistic tension "between the architectonic, rectilinear structure of the panel and grid and the freely expressive, space-evoking possibilities of painting." Her large-scale, mid-1970s paintings employ expressive paint handling, velvety sand-textured surfaces, and soft-edged, interwoven rectangular areas of dark, close-valued grays, purples and dark reds; Roberta Smith and Hilton Kramer likened their atmospheres to the work of artists such as Klee, Rothko and Braque.

Joanna Pousette-Dart, Untitled diptych, acrylic on canvas, 5' x 8', 1988–9.

In the 1980s, Pousette-Dart turned to a more gestural mode of painting. In her 1983 exhibition at Susan Caldwell, she introduced an architectonic element to her work with a freestanding, screen-like painting and rectangular canvasses arranged in tau, lintel-like and other relationships, which related to the multiple panels in Greek and Russian icons, friezes, and early Italian narrative painting. These works utilized an uninhibited mix of mediums, adapting Abstract Expressionist techniques to serial and temporal ends, with paint flowing uninterrupted from one surface on to the next; Art in America particularly noted a monumental, two-sided, freestanding untitled work featuring metallic pigment veiled in passages of dark oil.

Pousette-Dart's late 1980s work featured medium-large polyptychs with stacks or rows of three or four panels whose layered, painterly passages alternately obscure, deny, or reinforce their structures. These paintings, which draw on encounters with medieval frescoes and mosaics and early Mozarabic manuscripts, include the "Beatus" series (1985–9), named for an eighth-century monk and manuscript author. They are unified by recurrent bright, calligraphic forms with vague intimations of figuration and landscape.

=== Early shaped canvasses (1993–2002) ===
In the early 1990s, Pousette-Dart's perceptions of the space and light of the American Southwest inspired her to abandon painting within a rectangular format. Her first exhibition of this work (Tenri Gallery, 1995) featured delicately balanced diptychs of irregular curved and angular shaped canvasses that interlock like puzzle pieces. Untitled, Dark Edge diptych (1993–6, Museum of Fine Arts, Boston) is a representative and transitional work of this period, featuring two curved-side-down hemispheres, thickly painted grounds and Japanese calligraphy-like gesture.

Joanna Pousette-Dart, Untitled, Dark Edge diptych, acrylic on canvas, 9' x 12', 1993–6. Collection of the Museum of Fine Arts, Boston.

In addition to changing her format, Pousette-Dart softened her expressionistic tendencies, instead adopting delicate washes and nuanced variations in hue and tone; Art in America's Robert Edelman wrote that the washes hovered above and activated her surfaces to create spatial complexity and an effect of "quietude with an inner turbulence." For example, Gold Diptych (1994) featured one gently curved canvas atop another larger one, their interaction enhanced by a palette of metallic gold, earth tones, low-key ochres and green-golds, with washes of blue, violet and silver. Green Diptych (1994–5) inverted the spatial relationship and mingles deep warm and cool greens that lighten at the edges with centers of swirling circular brushstrokes that suggest empty vessels or voids; New York Times critic Pepe Karmel wrote that this work “reveals a subliminal affinity with Gorky and de Kooning," and likened it to "a landscape lifted into the sky."

=== Mature shaped canvasses (2003– ) ===
Pousette-Dart's mature shaped canvasses were first exhibited in New York in shows at Charles Cowles (2004), MoMA PS1 (2007) and Moti Hasson (2008). They feature configurations of curved panels with interior forms that can evoke both natural and manmade forms. These shapes are sometimes likened to objects such as canoes, boat hull and windshields, or the art of Northwest Coast indigenous peoples, but derive from her earlier hemisphere shapes, in elongated and compressed form.

The paintings generally feature two or three interlocking or nesting planes, conjoined horizontally and stacked large-to-small or small-to-large, whose dynamic arrangement suggests a world never fully at rest (e.g., Untitled (Cañones #3), 2007–8). They are overlaid with swooping, sinuous linear elements that define shapes and contours, which critics note for their graphic assuredness and compare to Arabic calligraphy or Native American art. Together, the panels and interior shapes imply senses of gravity (e.g., Untitled (Cañones #2), 2007–8) or buoyancy, containment or expansiveness, sequence (Untitled (Blue, Black, Red), 2011/3) or disruption, movement and panorama; John Yau writes that through these relationships, Pousette-Dart renders her abstract, flat surfaces responsive to nature without resorting to perspective or pictorialism.

She furthers these effects with her use of thinly applied, subtly modulating colors within shapes and across panels—light to dark or warm to cool—which suggest a relationship between light and form associated with the natural world rather than formalist or decorative concerns (e.g., Plateau, 2019). Critics describe her color sense as bright, idiosyncratic and offbeat, with a stark, relentless, arid luminosity they identify with the American Southwest—or Iberia and the Mediterranean—rather than her native New York (e.g., 3 Part Variation #7, 2012–3); Ken Johnson describes her paintings as having "lovely, slightly dry eggshell surfaces" that appear to be made with "a caressing touch that suggests thoughtful spontaneity."

Pousette-Dart's later exhibitions have been held at the Texas, Locks and Lisson galleries (2014–20) and Wiesbaden Museum (2019), the latter a wide-ranging show of work done over a 12-year period, arranged in a non-chronological dialogue. The Brooklyn Rail's Barbara MacAdam characterized that show's work as visceral, cerebral and widely allusive, conveying cultural references to the American Southwest, Europe, the Far East, and ancient and modern art without specifically describing anything.

== Collections and awards ==
Pousette-Dart's artwork belongs to the public collections of institutions including the Museum of Modern Art, Solomon R. Guggenheim Museum, Brooklyn Museum, Albright-Knox Art Gallery, Boston Museum of Fine Arts, Indianapolis Museum of Art, Parrish Art Museum, and Portland Art Museum, as well as many corporate and private collections.

She received a John Simon Guggenheim Memorial Fellowship in 1981, a National Endowment for the Arts award in 1989, and an American Academy of Arts and Letters Award in 2017. In 1980s, Pousette-Dart was also commissioned to design a mosaic wall for the Venice Beach home of Carol and Roy Doumani, designed by Robert Graham.
