= Pelliccioli =

Pelliccioli is a surname of Italian origin. Notable people with that name include:

- Giovanni Pelliccioli (born 1947), Italian painter.
- Mauro Pelliccioli (active 1947–1954), Italian conservator and restorer.
- Oscar Pellicioli (born 1965), Italian cyclist and manager.
