= Cutlet and Vegetables =

1816 painting by Raphaelle Peale

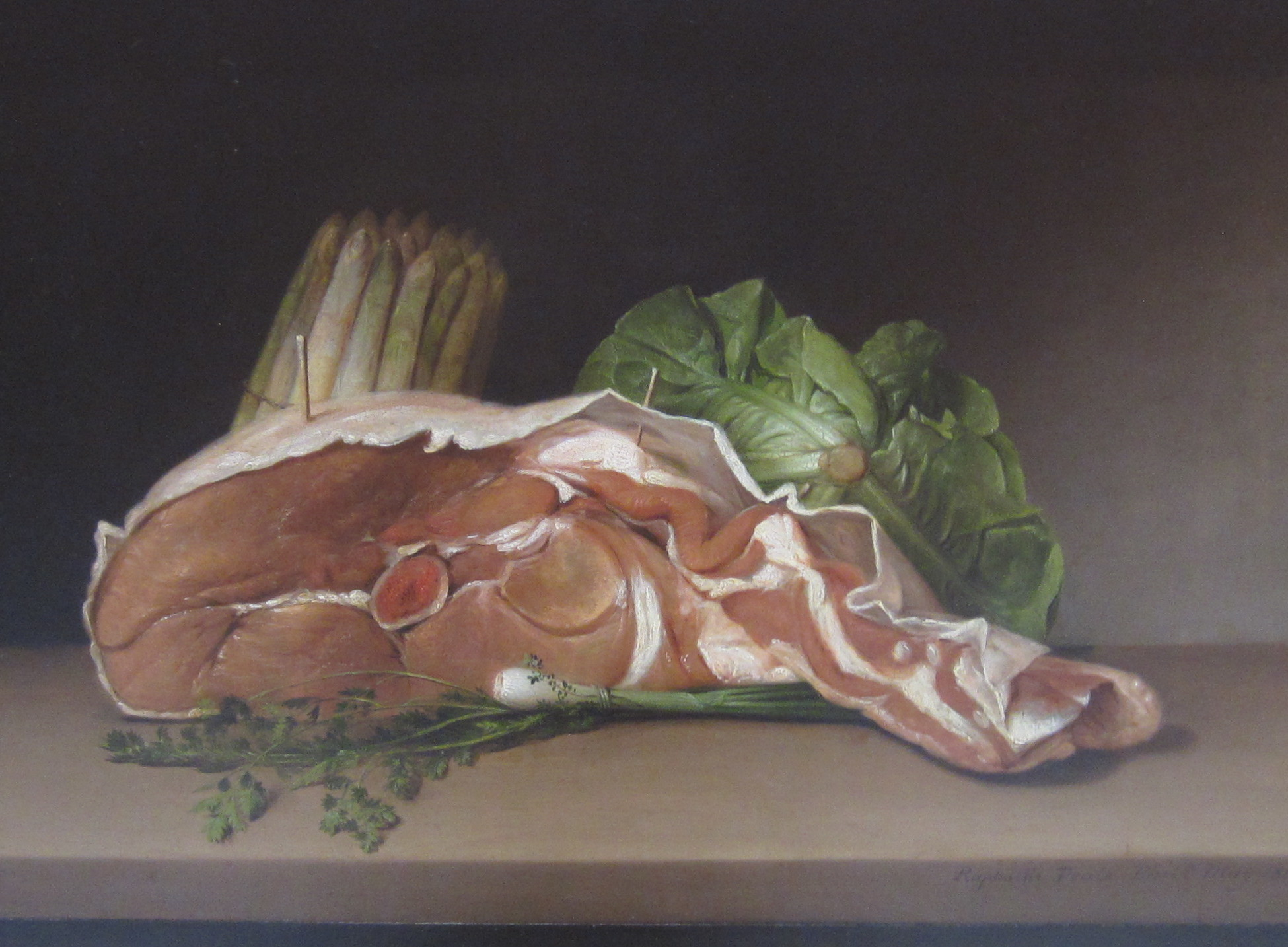
- Artist: Raphaelle Peale
- Year: 1816
- Medium: Oil on panel
- Location: Timken Museum of Art, San Diego, California, U.S.

Cutlet and Vegetables is an 1816 oil-on-panel painting by American still life artist Raphaelle Peale.
