= Precht =

Precht is a German family name. Famous people named Precht include:

- Fred A. Precht, German-American painter
- Richard David Precht, German writer and journalist
  - Precht (talk show), talk show on ZDF hosted by Richard David Precht
