= Still Life with Cake =

1818 painting by Raphaelle Peale

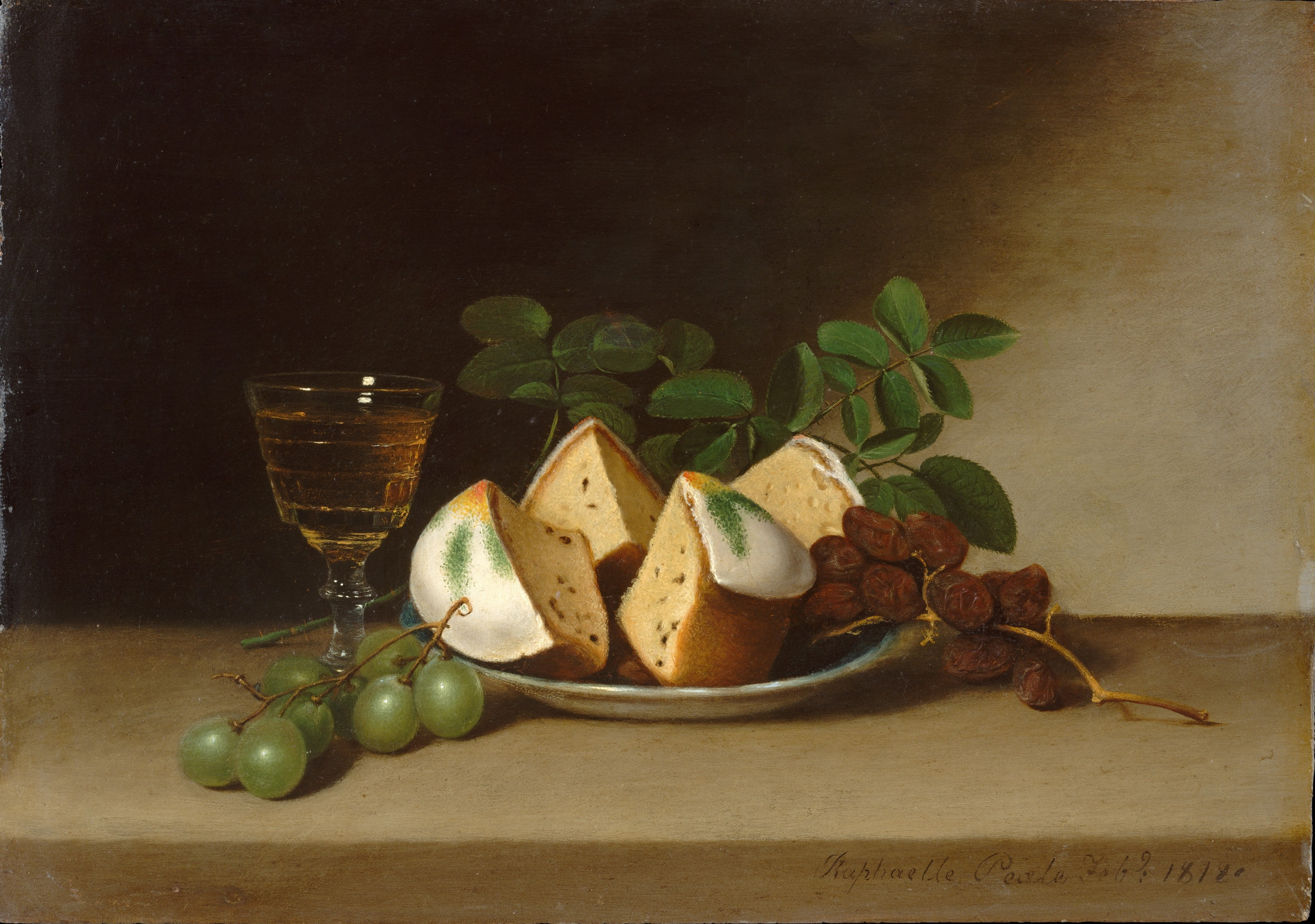
- Artist: Raphaelle Peale
- Year: 1818
- Medium: Oil on canvas
- Dimensions: 27.3 cm × 38.7 cm (10.7 in × 15.2 in)
- Location: Metropolitan Museum of Art; New York City
- Accession: 59.166

Still Life with Cake is an early 19th century still life painting by Raphaelle Peale. Done in oil on canvas, the painting is in the collection of the Metropolitan Museum of Art.

The work is on view in the Metropolitan Museum's Gallery 756.

== Description ==
The painting has some similarities with Spanish still life paintings, which Peale may have been inspired by when he visited Mexico. Still Life with Cake as "Still Life—Wine, Cakes, Grapes, &c."
