= Richard Pousette-Dart House and Studio =

Historic house in New York, United States

- U.S. National Register of Historic Places
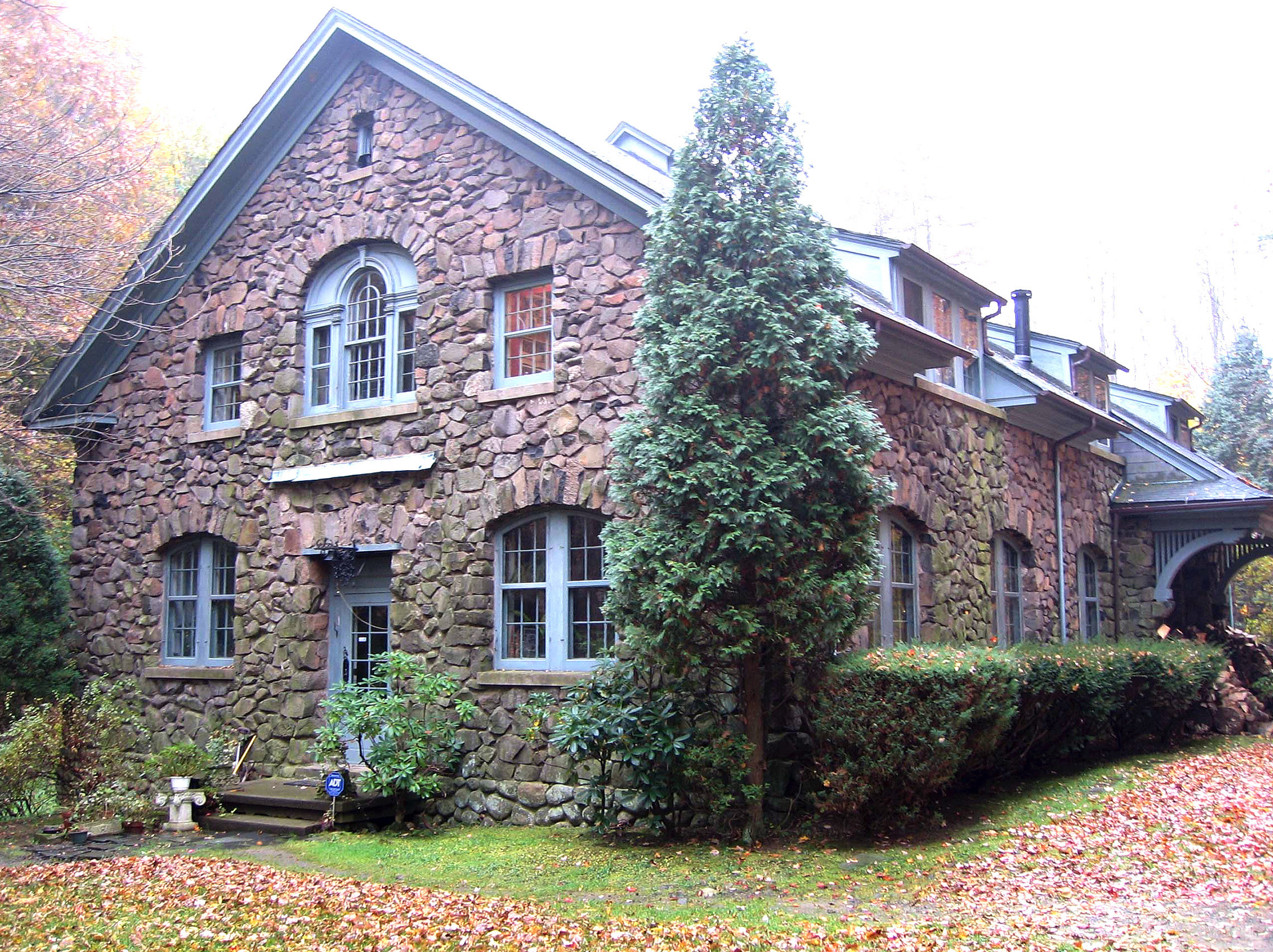
- Richard Pousette-Dart House and Studio

- Location within New York Location within the United States
- Nearest city: Suffern, New York
- Coordinates: 41°09′54″N 74°0′41″W
- Area: 2.14 acres (0.87 ha)
- Architect: unknown
- Architectural style: American Craftsman, Bungalow
- NRHP reference No.: 100004802
- Added to NRHP: December 23, 2019

The Richard Pousette-Dart House and Studio is a historic property located northeast of Suffern in Rockland County, New York. The American Craftsman and Bungalow-style, stone building was originally erected c. 1916 as a carriage house for a country estate owned by New York City merchant Henry Potter McKenny. From 1959 to 1992, the structure served as the family home and studio of Richard Pousette-Dart (1916–1992), an American abstract expressionist artist and founding member of the New York School of painting. In 2019, the house was added to the National Register of Historic Places.

== History ==
The property's buildings were built c. 1916 as the carriage house and staff quarters of Valley Head Farm, a country estate developed by Henry Potter McKenny, a New York City textile merchant. The structure's interior was originally used in part for motor vehicle storage. After McKenny's death in 1940, the estate was subdivided into smaller estates and sold.

In December 1958, the Pousette-Darts purchased a parcel with the carriage house and gardener's cottage situated on a roughly two-acre lot to serve as a family home and art studio. Pousette-Dart was a first-generation abstract-expressionist artist, who also taught at the Art Students League of New York, The New School for Social Research, and Bard College, among other institutions. His work belongs to the collections of the Metropolitan Museum of Art, Museum of Modern Art, National Gallery, Whitney Museum of American Art, and other museums. The building served not only as a home and studio for Pousette-Dart's mature art production, but as a gathering place for Pousette-Dart's circle of cultural associates and for student retreats.

The studio survives largely as Pousette-Dart maintained it, with works of art, art supplies and objects of interest to him that remain from his occupancy. After Pousette-Dart's death in 1992, the Whitney Museum staged a 1998 exhibition that featured a partial recreation of the studio in order to provide greater insight into the relationship between his art and working environment.

== Building and grounds ==
The Pousette-Dart property is located on 932 Haverstraw Road (U.S. Route 202) and includes two original buildings: a 1.5-story residence with a footprint of roughly 68 by 38 feet and a stone gardener's cottage with an attached greenhouse at the rear of the house. The buildings sit on an L-shaped, 2.14-acre parcel along the east bank of the Mahwah River, a tributary of the Ramapo River that traverses the property. The parcel is bounded on the west by woods and the Ramapo Mountains. The somewhat secluded, natural environment has been cited as an inspiration to Pousette-Dart's art; the titles of several paintings reference the area, including Presence, Ramapo Mist (1969, Whitney Museum of American Art) and Presence, Ramapo Horizon (1975, Metropolitan Museum of Art).

The house is a load-bearing masonry and concrete construction with wood and metal internal framing. It possesses a rustic stone envelope and chimney created with irregular courses of undressed field stone, a pitched end-gable roof, Palladian and arched windows, and projecting eaves—stylistic elements that draw on the late 19th and early 20th-century American Craftsman and Arts & Crafts movements and Neoclassical styles. Pousette-Dart added three skylights to the original structure to provide natural light for the 1,465 square-foot, second-floor studio.

The building now serves as the home of The Richard Pousette-Dart Foundation.

== See also ==
- National Register of Historic Places listings in Rockland County, New York
