= L. Vance Phillips =

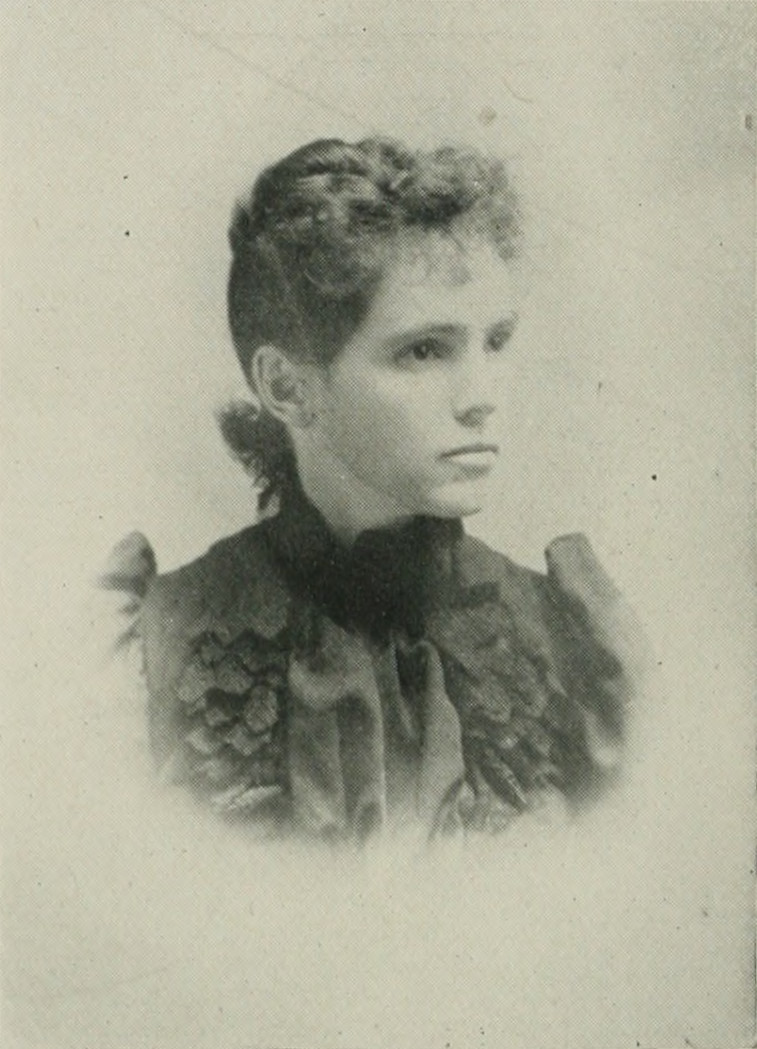
L. Vance Phillips, A woman of the century

Luella J. Vance Phillips (24 March 1858 – February 10, 1939) was an American china-painting artist and one of the founders of the Pi Beta Phi fraternity at Hastings College in Nebraska.

== Early life ==
Luella "Lou" J. Vance was born in a country home in Vernon County, Wisconsin, in 1858, the last child of Sampson Anderson Vance (1833–1864) and Jane McMahon. Her father died of disease while serving with the Union Army during the Civil War, and her mother later remarried to Captain William Horlocker. The family moved to Nebraska.

At age 10, she showed extraordinary talent in art. She was later educated at York College in Nebraska.

== Career ==
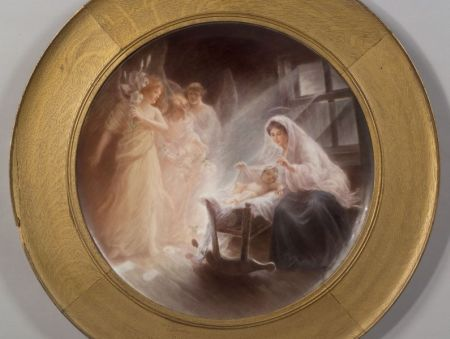
Hand Painted Porcelain Plaque of Mary and Baby Jesus, dated 1913

Phillips studied under the best teachers in Chicago, Cincinnati and New York. Limited always to her own earnings, she progressed steadily and won an enviable fame. Not only in the State of Nebraska, but in the art centers of the country, her work received high praise, and the art magazines did her honor in their reviews of the Chicago yearly exhibits.

In china-decorating, her specialty, she excelled, and also in figure-painting.

The Pi Beta Phi fraternity at Hastings College was founded on November 17, 1887, as Nebraska Beta by Luella Vance Phillips, Maud C. Harrison, Flora S. Bowman McCloud, Flora Blackburn Lamson, Lillie Selby Moor. The charter members were: Leta Horlocker (Phillips's sister), Luella Vance Phillips, Adeline Shedd, Freda Elizabeth Wahlquist Zacharias. Phillips was one of the initial 10 teachers.

In 1890, Phillips, then living at Grand Island, won a gold medal for the best china painting at the Western Art Association meeting in Omaha. She won it again in 1891, at the time living in Kearney.

In 1893, Phillips was in Chicago for the World's Columbian Exposition, where she had a studio for China painting, and she decided to remain in Chicago after the fair closed.

In 1894, she moved to New York City.

In 1896, she published Book of the China Painter: A complete guide for the keramic decorator. It was the first of a series of art amateur handbooks published by Montague Marks of New York City. Experienced teachers contributed to the volume articles on special branches of the art, and the book contained full instructions for glass painting. It was illustrated with 150 black and white drawings on the text, and six colored plates, and the cost was $3.

In 1899, Phillips was elected chairman of education at the Chicago convention of the Miniature Painters Association. In June 1899 she worked with Laura Overly in her studio on Penn Avenue, Pittsburgh. While there, Phillips held an exhibition of her work.

Beginning of the 1900s, Phillips was in New York City working as Elocution, Voice Culture, Physical Culture trainer with a studio in the Carnegie Hall. She was a lecturer on Methods of Improving Articulation. Through the 1900s and the 1910s she also continued with art lessons, giving lectures on Colors, showing charts and masks disclosing color schemes. The charts were a key to a practical use of color. Phillips also taught at Chautauqua Lake Summer School. In 1911 she taught at the Duquesne Ceramic Club.

== Personal life ==
In 1888, she married Francis C. Philips. Phillips resided in Hastings, Grand Island, Kearney, and Omaha, Nebraska.

She later moved to Penn Yan, New York, where she lived the final 14 years of her life with her daughter, Loreta.
