= Richard Pousette-Dart =

American abstract expressionist artist (1916–1992)

- Born: Richard Warren Pousette-Dart; June 8, 1916; Saint Paul, Minnesota, U.S.
- Died: October 25, 1992 (aged 76); New York City, New York, U.S.
- Education: Abstract painting
- Movement: Abstract expressionism, New York School

Richard Warren Pousette-Dart (June 8, 1916 – October 25, 1992) was an American abstract expressionist artist most recognized as a founder of the New York School of painting. His artistic output also includes drawing, sculpture, and fine-art photography.

== Early life ==
Richard Pousette-Dart was born in Saint Paul, Minnesota and moved to Valhalla, New York in 1918. His mother, Flora Louise Pousette-Dart (née Dart), was a poet and musician; his father, Nathaniel J. Pousette-Dart (né Pousette), was a painter, art director, educator, and writer about art. His parents had combined their last names to form Pousette-Dart upon marrying. Pousette-Dart began painting and drawing by the age of eight, and in 1928 was featured in a New York Times photograph showing Richard and his father sketching each other's portraits. He attended the Scarborough School and by his teens possessed well-formed views about abstract art, writing in a psychology paper, "The greater the work of art, the more abstract and impersonal it is; the more it embodies universal experience, and the fewer specific personality traits it reveals." He attended Bard College in 1936, leaving after one semester to pursue an independent track as an artist in New York City. Pousette-Dart's first professional positions were as an assistant to sculptor Paul Manship and secretary in the photographic retouching studio of Lynn T. Morgan.

== Career ==
Richard Pousette-Dart, Symphony No. 1, The Transcendental, oil on canvas, 1941–42, Metropolitan Museum of Art

Pousette-Dart initially concentrated on stone carving, expanding his work to include cast bronze and brass. He held in high regard the work of Henri Gaudier-Brzeska, who embraced tribal art and its ability to convey power and mystery through three-dimensional form. During the 1930s, Pousette-Dart frequented the American Museum of Natural History and became deeply interested in the formal and spiritual aspects of African, Oceanic and Native American art, especially carvings produced by Northwest Indian cultures. Many of his paintings and sculptures from the 1930s, such as Woman Bird Group (Smithsonian American Art Museum), embrace these totemic and symbolic forms.

In 1938, Pousette-Dart began a friendship with Ukrainian émigré John D. Graham, whose writings offered a framework for engaging the ideas of European cubists and surrealists then being exhibited in New York City. Graham also encouraged interest in so-called “primitive” archetypal forms, and Pousette-Dart produced canvases with complex, interlocking biomorphic and geometric imagery, as well as hundreds of stylized, abstracted drawings of figures, heads, and animals.

Savage Rose by Richard Pousette-Dart, 1951

Pousette-Dart's first one-man exhibition of painting took place at the Artists’ Gallery in New York in the fall of 1941, a year after he completed the painting Desert (collection of The Museum of Modern Art. In 1942, he completed Symphony No. 1, The Transcendental, a painting of heroic scale too large to show at the Marian Willard Gallery, where it was to be exhibited. This work was the first mural-sized easel painting by the New York School artists, influencing works such as Mural by Jackson Pollock (1943) and The Liver Is the Cock's Comb by Arshile Gorky (1944). During the mid-1940s, Pousette-Dart exhibited at Howard Putzel's 67 Gallery, Peggy Guggenheim's Art of This Century and, in 1948, joined the Betty Parsons Gallery, which exhibited the work of Mark Rothko, Jackson Pollock, Clyfford Still, Barnett Newman, Ad Reinhardt and other painters who came to shape the formative cannon of the New York School.

During the 1940s, Pousette-Dart's studio was located at 436 East 56th Street in Manhattan, near the Queensboro Bridge. His East River Paintings, created in this studio during the late 1940s, embrace the amplification of line, often realized by direct application of paint from the tube onto mixed-medium grounds that include sand, poured paint, and gold and silver leaf. In 1951, Pousette-Dart relocated to a farmhouse in Sloatsburg, New York, and eventually to nearby Suffern, where he maintained a studio for the remainder of his life. It was in that same year that he was awarded a Guggenheim Fellowship for Fine Arts.

Throughout the 1940s and 1950s, Pousette-Dart experimented widely with varying types of media and approaches, alternating broadly between densely filled canvases and more simplified surfaces and forms. Richly layered works known as Gothic and Byzantine paintings, for instance, use heavy, layered impasto and resplendent, prismatic color to invoke manuscript illuminations, mosaics and stained glass windows. Savage Rose from 1951, in the collection of the Honolulu Museum of Art, is an example of these heavily impastoed works. "White Paintings," in contrast, are ethereal compositions of graphite line on variegated white grounds.

Beginning in the late 1950s, Pousette-Dart experimented with building form through small, individual dabs of color, creating paintings and works on paper that exhibit all-over, field-like compositions. By the 1960s, he concentrated on large-scale works composed of thick layers of such gestural marks, evoking pulsating, glowing allusions to space. Paintings known as Hieroglyphs, Presences and Radiances display dense fields and calligraphic structures that emerge and recede visually. Works of the 1970s and 1980s often exhibit large shapes—orbs and geometric forms—that serve as mandala-like focal points. While Pousette-Dart embraced a wide range of intense color within paintings and works on paper from the 1960s through the 1990s, he equally explored themes in black and white.

In 1950, Pousette-Dart executed several drawings for a book written and published by editor and book designer Merle Armitage. Taos Quartet in Three Movements was originally to appear in Flair Magazine, but the magazine folded before its publication. This short work describes the tumultuous relationship of D. H. Lawrence, his wife Frieda, artist Dorothy Brett and Mabel Dodge Sterne, a wealthy patron of the arts. Armitage took it upon himself to print 16 hardcover copies of this work for his friends. Taos Quartet appears to be the only book illustrated by Pousette-Dart.

Pousette-Dart exhibited with the Betty Parsons Gallery until its closure in 1983, and as such, his work was introduced to a younger generation of artists showing at the gallery, including Ellsworth Kelly, Agnes Martin, Richard Tuttle, Robert Rauschenberg, and Jack Youngerman. In 1963, The Whitney Museum of American Art staged Pousette-Dart's first retrospective, with additional Whitney exhibitions in 1974 and 1998. During the 1970s, Pousette-Dart worked in Europe, including Antibes, France, where he concentrated on watercolor. In 1990, Pousette-Dart's most complete retrospective was held at the Indianapolis Museum of Art, for which he created a 10 x 10-foot bronze door, Cathedral, which remains on permanent view.

== Critical reception ==
Pousette-Dart is widely regarded as an Abstract Expressionist. He was fiercely independent and temperamentally disinclined to the downtown New York City tavern scene that fueled the artistic personas of Jackson Pollock, Franz Kline, Willem de Kooning, and others. Pousette-Dart did contribute to key discourses that shaped the emergence of the New York School: in 1948, he attended gatherings at the Subjects of the Artist experimental school; in 1950 he participated in a three-day closed-door conference at Studio 35; and a year later Pousette-Dart was included in the landmark exhibition Abstract Painting and Sculpture in America at The Museum of Modern Art. In January 1951, he was included in Nina Leen’s “The Irascibles,” published in Life magazine. This now-iconic photograph has largely come to define the core group of Abstract Expressionists.

The work of Pousette-Dart is often noted for its meditative and spiritual orientation, although the artist was not affiliated with any organized religious entity. In a talk given at New York's Union Theological Seminary on December 2, 1952, he noted: "My definition of religion amounts to art and my definition of art amounts to religion. I don't believe you can have one significantly without the other. Art and religion are the inseparable structure and living adventure of the creative.... Art is not a matter of perfect technique; it is life of the soul."

== Photography ==
As a child, Pousette-Dart experimented with pin-hole photography and cameras, and by the mid-1940s he became extremely active as a fine-art photographer. His photographic works were first exhibited at the Betty Parsons Gallery in 1948, and in 1953 he was awarded third prize in Photography magazine's International Picture Contest. Additional exhibitions include a one-man show at Wittenborn's in New York City in 1953 and inclusion in A Second Talent: Painters and Sculptors Who Are Also Photographers at the Aldrich Museum of Contemporary Art in 1985.

Pousette-Dart's fine-art photography largely concentrates on portraits and nature studies. Notable sitters include Mark Rothko, John D. Graham, Betty Parsons, Theodoros Stamos, Barnett Newman, Robert Flaherty, and violinist Alexander "Sasha" Schneider. Many photographic portraits are experimental in nature, employing double-exposure, superimposition, and other forms of darkroom manipulation, which Pousette-Dart executed himself. Nature studies are often close-up views of organic forms, such as circular flowers and light refracted through ice, that share an affinity with visual themes in his mature painting

== Teaching ==
Among Pousette-Dart's earliest students was Saul Leiter, who came to New York in 1946 to study painting with Pousette-Dart, but became enthralled by the elder artist's photography, spurring him to choose a career as a photographer.

From 1950 to 1961 Pousette-Dart taught painting at the New School for Social Research. Positions followed at Columbia University (1967), Sarah Lawrence College (1970–1974), the Art Students League (1980–1985), and Bard College (1983–1992). Among Pousette-Dart's notable students at the Art Students League were the expansionist painter/sculpturer Molly Ackerman who became in 1988 his in-studio assistant in Suffern, New York State, the Chinese activist artists Ai Weiwei and Zhang Hongtu. Christopher Wool studied with Pousette-Dart at Sarah Lawrence College, recalling, "Richard embraced his role as a teacher, but also didn't want to provide solutions for his students; he wanted them to look for their own answers. Instead of being dogmatic or indoctrinating he encouraged everyone to look for their own way."

== Personal views and family ==
As early as high school, Pousette-Dart held a strong belief in pacifism. His 1935 essay for the high school magazine The Beechwood Tree was “I Have Been Called a Dreamer,” calling for pacifism. During World War II, Pousette-Dart became a conscientious objector, sent letters protesting the war to government officials, and refused to undergo an army medical exam. He was not prosecuted for his positions or actions.

Pousette-Dart married poet Evelyn Gracey (1919-2025), in New York City in 1946. Their daughter Joanna Pousette-Dart is an abstract painter who lives and works in New York City. His son Jon Pousette-Dart is a musician and founder of The Pousette-Dart Band.

== Legacy ==
Pousette-Dart died on October 25, 1992, in New York City. In 1996, exhibitions of his photography were held at the Zabriskie Gallery in New York City. In 1997–1998 he was honored with a retrospective at The Metropolitan Museum of Art, and in 1998 the Whitney Museum of American Art staged Richard Pousette-Dart: The Studio Within, a major exhibition of paintings that featured a recreation of the artist's studio. Other major posthumous exhibitions include a traveling exhibition of works on paper organized by Conrad Oberhuber at the Schirn Kunsthalle in Frankfurt, Germany (2001), a jointly-produced retrospective exhibition at the Peggy Guggenheim Collection in Venice, Italy and Solomon R. Guggenheim Museum in New York City (2007), and Pousette-Dart: Predominantly White Paintings at The Phillips Collection in Washington, D.C. (2010) revisiting an original Betty Parsons Gallery exhibition of the same name.

In 1965, Pousette-Dart was awarded an Honorary Doctorate of Humane Letters from Bard College, and in 1981 was honored with the inaugural Distinguished Lifetime in Art award from the Louis Comfort Tiffany Foundation. He exhibited in the main pavilion of the 40th Venice Biennale in 1982.

The Richard Pousette-Dart Foundation was established in 2013. The estate of Richard Pousette-Dart is represented by The Pace Gallery. In 2019, the Richard Pousette-Dart House and Studio in Suffern, New York was listed on the U.S. National Park Service's National Register of Historical Places.

== Additional references ==
- Gordon, John, Richard Pousette-Dart, New York, Whitney Museum of American Art in cooperation with Praeger, 1963.
- Hobbs, Robert, and Joanne Kuebler, Richard Pousette-Dart, Indianapolis, Indianapolis Museum of Art in cooperation with Indiana University Press, 1990.
- Marika Herskovic, American Abstract Expressionism of the 1950s An Illustrated Survey, (New York School Press, 2003.) ISBN 0-9677994-1-4. p. 266-269
- Marika Herskovic, New York School Abstract Expressionists Artists Choice by Artists, (New York School Press, 2000.) ISBN 0-9677994-0-6. p. 16; p. 38; p. 282- 285
