= Marten Post =

Marten Post (born 25 July 1942) is a Dutch visual artist.

== Biography ==
Post was born in Gilfach Goch, Wales, the son of a Dutch father of Frisian origin and a Welsh mother. He lived in turns in his native country and in the Netherlands. In 1947 he moved with his mother and sister to his father's home country. His father served with the Princess Irene Brigade, who helped liberate the Netherlands in World War II.

== Artistic career ==
Marten started drawing and painting while still a child and later studied at the art colleges in Arnhem and Enschede. He flourished in the climate of the 1960s. During and after his student years he worked as a designer and performed his own work as a singer/songwriter, accompanying himself on a guitar. At the time he was also exhibiting paintings, pen and ink drawings and graphic work.

After teaching art part-time for several years at the Menso Alting college in Hoogeveen, he settled in 1969 as a full-time artist in Holten, in Overijssel province. Besides painting, he carries out assignments in disciplines such as design, illustration and photography. During this period he taught evening classes at an adult education centre in Almelo. His educational aspirations were apparent in his studio where he started an experimental art group for children ages 6 to 9 years, involving their parents in the process.

In 1972 he was offered the post of Head of Art at Atlantic College in South Wales, a founder college of the United World Colleges. His arrival coincided with the start of the 'Arts and Design’ examination program as part of the International Baccalaureate. His main ambition was to provide his students with structures that would give them the confidence to form a personal basis from which they could explore and develop their own individual talents. Many of his students are now spread around the world as artists in their own right, as painters, sculptors, filmmakers and architects.

In 1980, Marten Post and his wife Reina were appointed ‘House Parents’ with responsibility for managing a student house with 48 young people in their care. They continued to fulfil this duty while Crown Prince Willem-Alexander of the Netherlands was studying at Atlantic College.

After his retirement from Atlantic College in the summer of 2002, Marten Post and his family returned to the Netherlands. He found a home in Kesteren, situated south of the Rhine river, just opposite the Grebbeberg. His studio is some 10 miles to the west in Tiel, in a former office building near the Waal.

== Visual art ==
Marten Post writes:

"In my studio there are usually four or five paintings “with whom I am in discussion”. Sometimes there are long interruptions. The acrylic paint is built up in many transparent or semi-transparent layers. As visual artist I mediate between the multi-dimensional and the two dimensional world. In the first I move and capture various signals, These I process internally and make choices. My work is the residue of these decisions that are developed in the second dimension. This is not an automatic process. A great deal of 'effort' is required in wrestling with the medium as well as keeping one’s options open in registering. I always carry a small sketchbook with me.”

== Exhibitions ==
Marten Post has shown his work in more than a hundred exhibitions at home and abroad. This includes participation in many group exhibitions in particular in Wales and the Netherlands.
