= Fred A. Precht =

German-American painter

- Born: November 29, 1863; Germany
- Died: 1942 (aged 78–79)
- Occupation: American painter

Fred A. Precht (1863–1942) was a painter of portraits and interior scenes.

== Life ==
Precht was born in Germany on November 29, 1863 and immigrated to the United States in 1880, at age 16. He lived and worked in New York City, exhibiting in the Society of Independent Artists, the National Academy of Design and the Pennsylvania Academy of the Fine Arts between 1917 and 1930. He died in 1942.
