= Raphaelle Peale =

Painter from the United States (1774–1825)

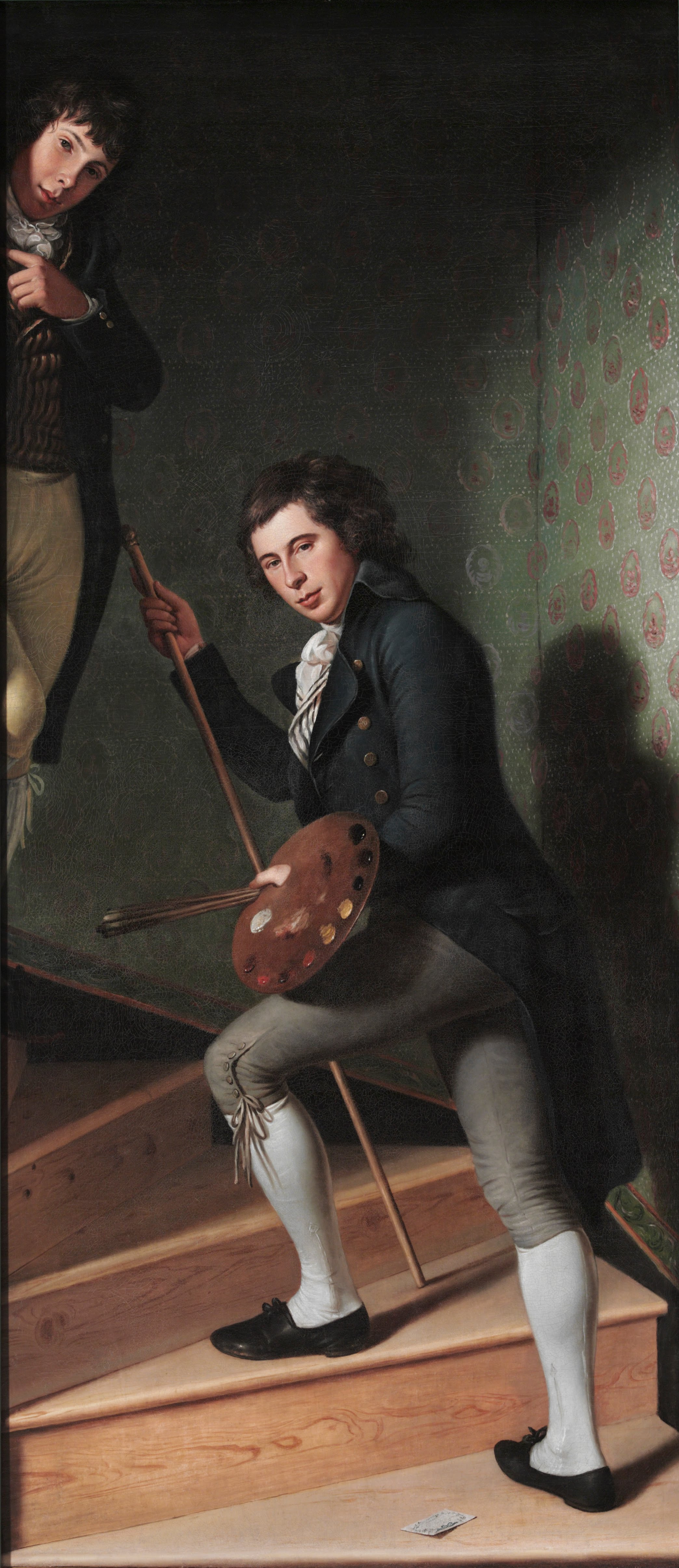
Raphaelle Peale (lower) and his brother Titian as painted by his father Charles Willson Peale in the "Staircase Group" (1795)

Raphaelle Peale (sometimes spelled Raphael Peale; February 17, 1774 – March 4, 1825) is considered the first professional American painter of still-life.

== Biography ==
Peale was born in Annapolis, Maryland, the fifth child, though eldest surviving, of the painter Charles Willson Peale and his first wife Rachel Brewer. He grew up in Philadelphia, and spent his life there in a home at the corner of 3rd and Lombard. Like his siblings (almost all of whom were named after famous artists or scientists), Raphaelle was trained by his father as an artist. Early in his career, the pair collaborated on portraits. On some commissions, Raphaelle painted miniatures while his brother, Rembrandt, painted full-size portraits.

In 1793, he made a trip to South America in order to collect specimens for the Peale Museum founded by his father. He exhibited five portraits and eight other paintings, probably still lifes, at the Columbianum, Philadelphia in 1794. His first professional exhibition was in 1795 at the age of 21. In 1797, with his brother Rembrandt, he traveled to Charleston, South Carolina, where they attempted to establish another museum. The plan fell through, however, and Raphaelle returned to painting miniatures.

He married Martha (Patty) McGlathery at the age of twenty, and with her had eight children. For about two years beginning in 1803, Peale toured Virginia with the "physiognotrace", a profile making machine, with which he was briefly successful. By 1806 he had begun to suffer the symptoms of arsenic and mercury poisoning brought on by his work as a taxidermist in his father's museum. In August 1809 he was hospitalized with delirium, and for the rest of his life he suffered debilitating attacks almost yearly—which his father ascribed to "gout of the stomach" caused by consumption of pickles and excessive drinking.

From 1810, Peale concentrated on still-life painting almost exclusively, becoming America's first professional still-life painter, and he exhibited frequently at the Pennsylvania Academy of the Fine Arts and elsewhere, especially from 1814 to 1818. By 1813, he was unable to walk without crutches. After the downturn in his health, in an era when most artists considered still life a subject worthy only of amateurs, he devoted himself almost exclusively to still life painting. It is for these works he is best known. His work was on frequent exhibit at the Pennsylvania Academy of the Fine Arts between 1814 and 1818. After reportedly indulging in a night of heavy drinking, his health destroyed, he died on March 4, 1825, at age 51 at his home in Philadelphia.

== Style ==
Alfred Frankenstein has called Raphaelle Peale "the first really distinguished still-life specialist to emerge in this country, and he is one of the four major still-life painters of the nineteenth century in the United States." His style may have been influenced by Spanish still life paintings he saw on his trip to Mexico and by the two works by Juan Sanchez Cotan, exhibited at the Pennsylvania Academy in 1816. Most of Peale's paintings are small in scale, and depict a few objects—usually foodstuffs—arranged on a tabletop before a darkened background.

A notable exception to this is his trompe-l'œil, Venus Rising from the Sea—A Deception (also entitled After the Bath, 1822, in the collection of the Nelson-Atkins Museum of Art). This painting serves as a distinct thematic departure from his other work. While the dark backdrop is consistent with his still life works, there were themes of this work that make it unique amongst Peale's other works. Instead of featuring food, the subject is Venus, who is just barely visible from behind the napkin covering her. This theme of covering is consistent with a previous work of his, Peaches Covered by a Handkerchief. By covering the subject, Peale introduced a theme of mystery to his painting which has survived to this day. The act of covering a nude figure was not new to the world of art, however Peale took this choice literally when painting the cover into the painting itself. The mystery of this work is compounded by the lack of clear date on the painting itself due to a smudged last digit. There was also an element of humor within this particular work. According to family stories, Peale painted this work in part as a prank on his wife. Making it appear as if he was hiding a pornographic image under a napkin, he wanted to goad his wife into scratching at the canvas. This sets this painting apart from the other Peale works, which tend to follow a more straightforward approach as previously mentioned.

It was his nephew George Escol Sellers's opinion that Raphaelle Peale was the most talented of Charles Wilson Peale's artist children and that "it was the Revolution that made him the wreck he was".

== Notable works ==
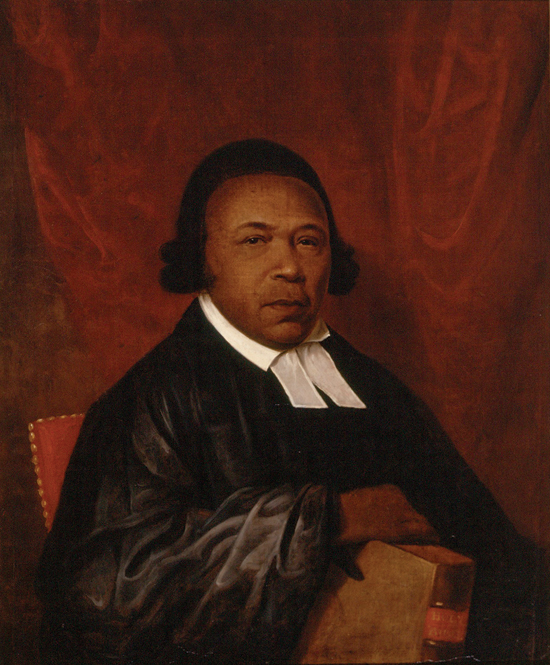
Portrait of Absalom Jones, 1810, Delaware Art Museum

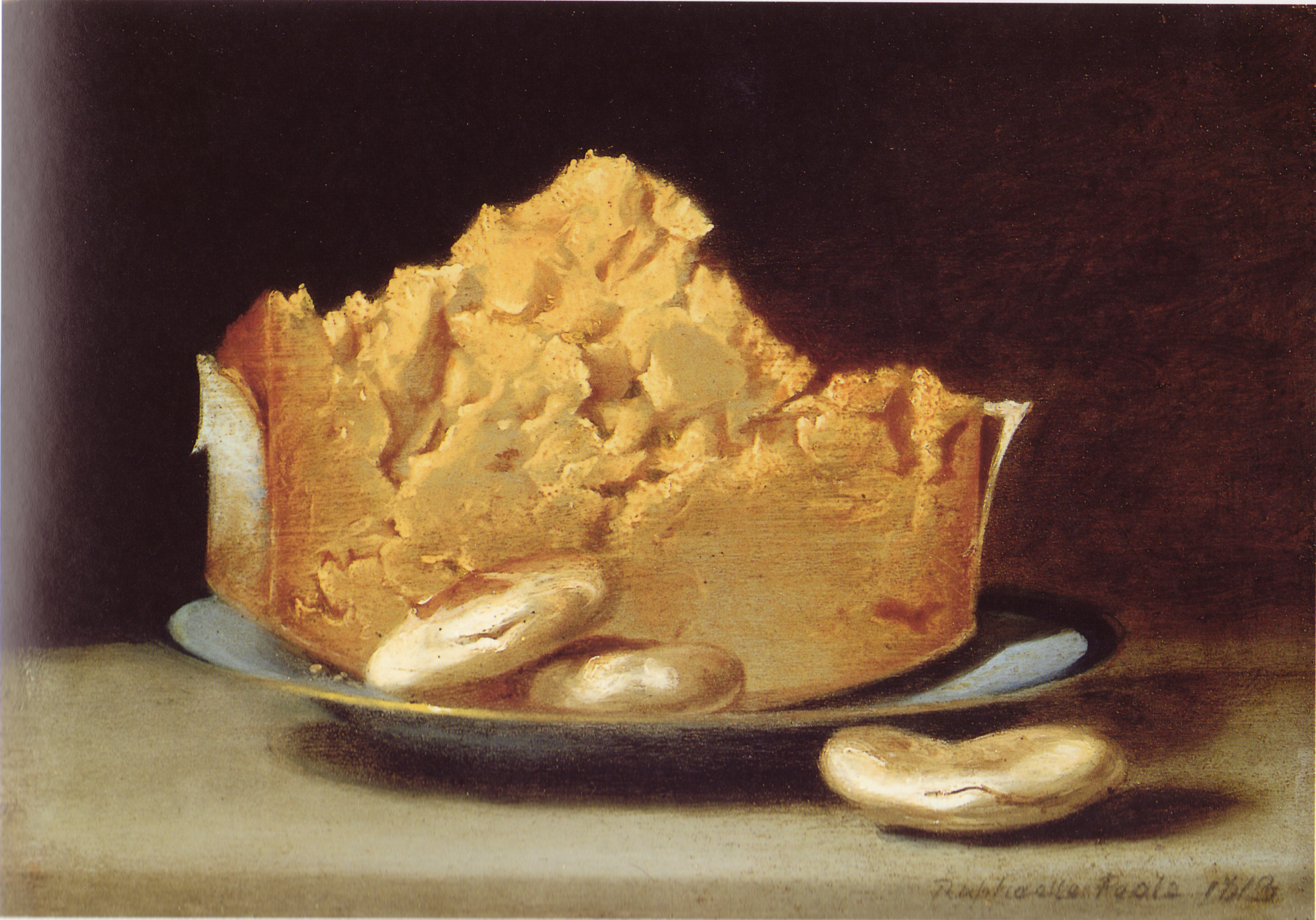
Cheese with three crackers, 1813

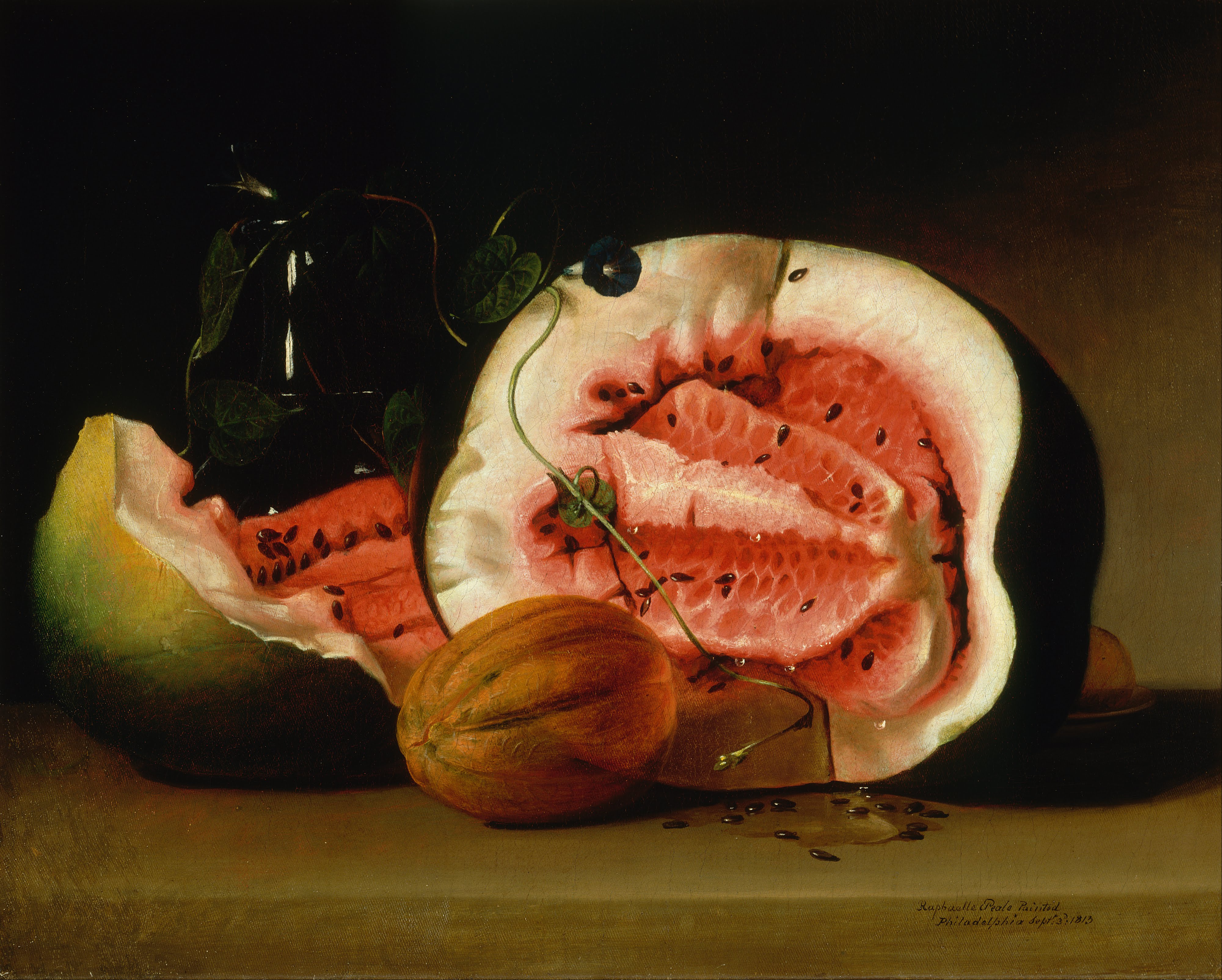
Melons and Morning Glories, 1813

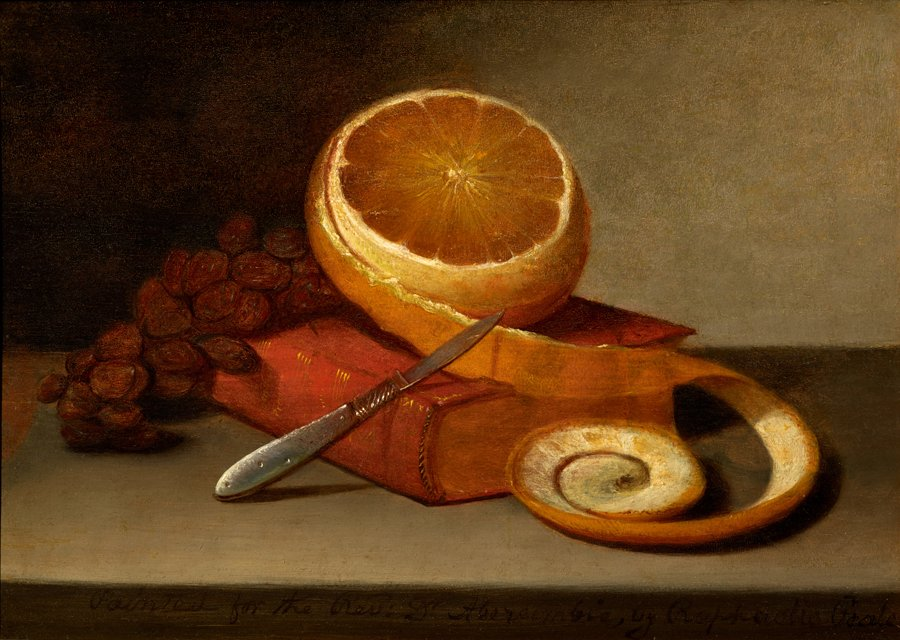
Still Life with Orange and Book, 1815

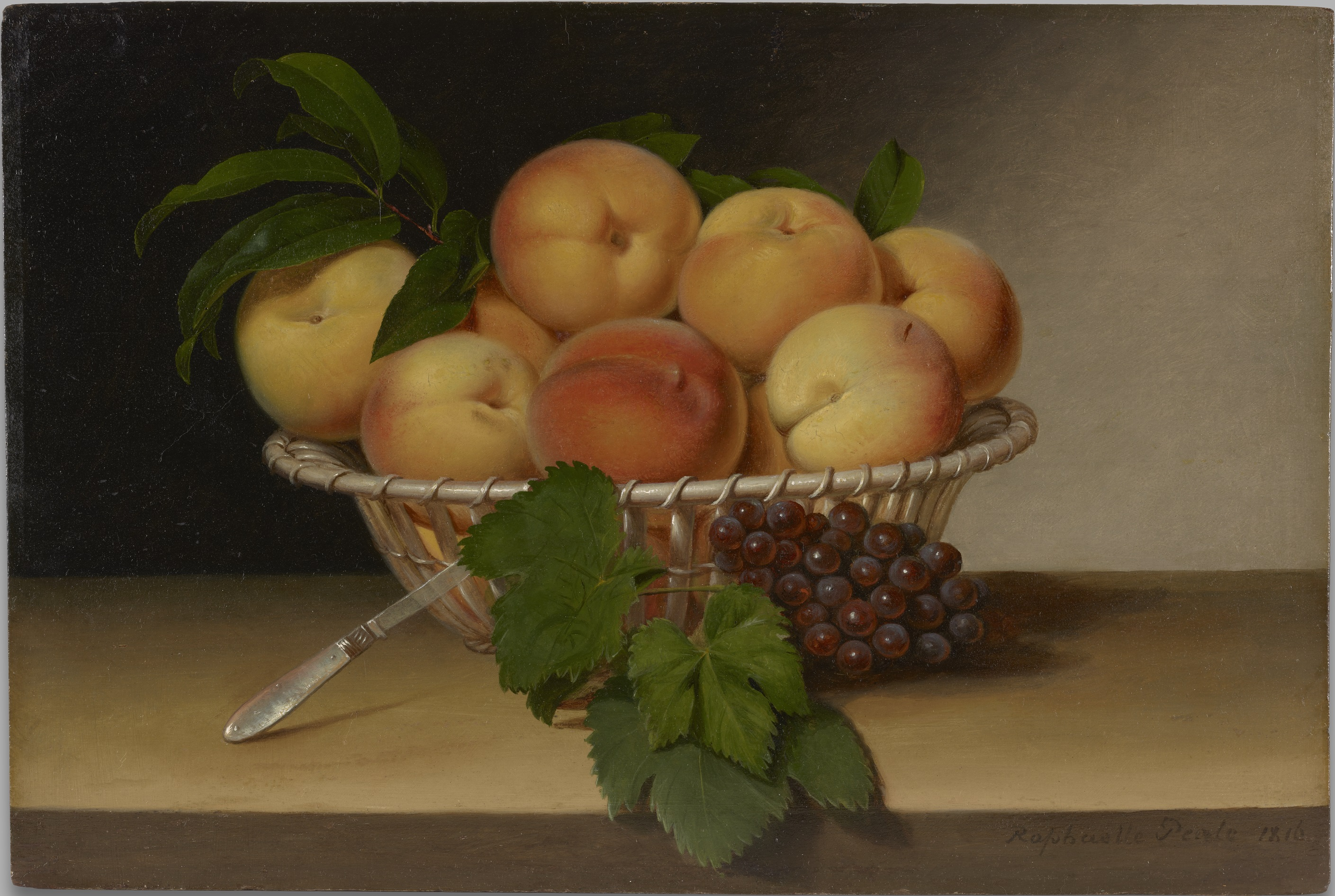
Still Life: Basket of Peaches, 1816

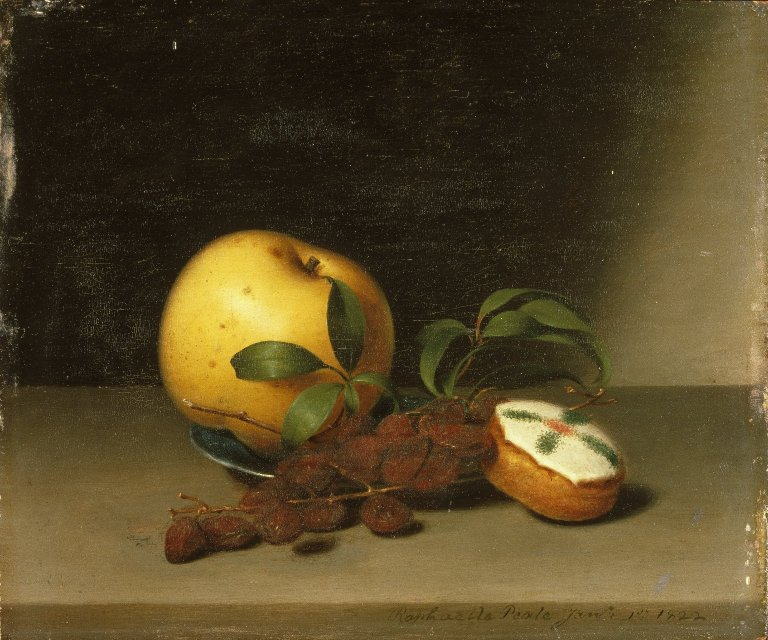
Still Life with Cake, 1816

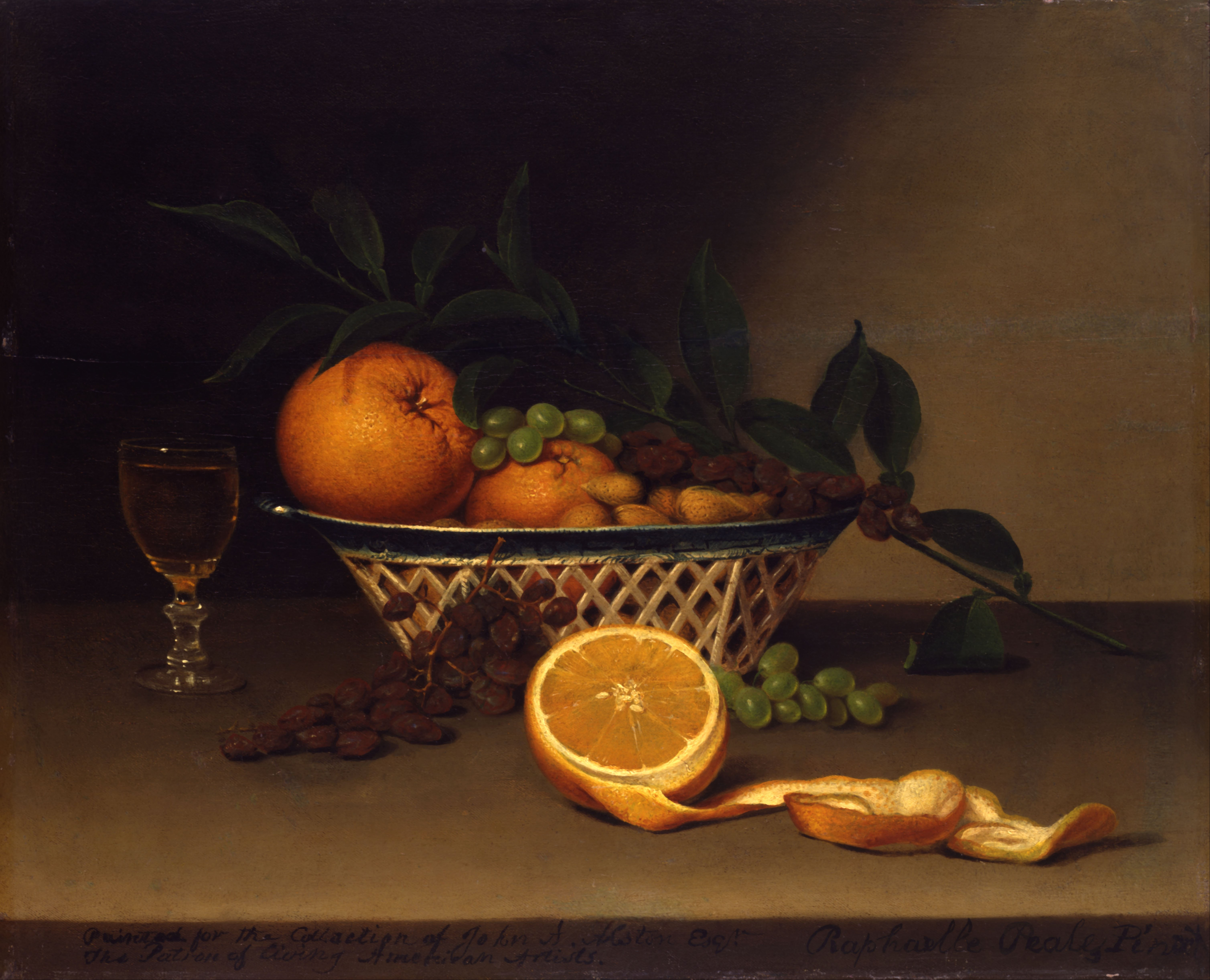
Still Life with Oranges, 1818

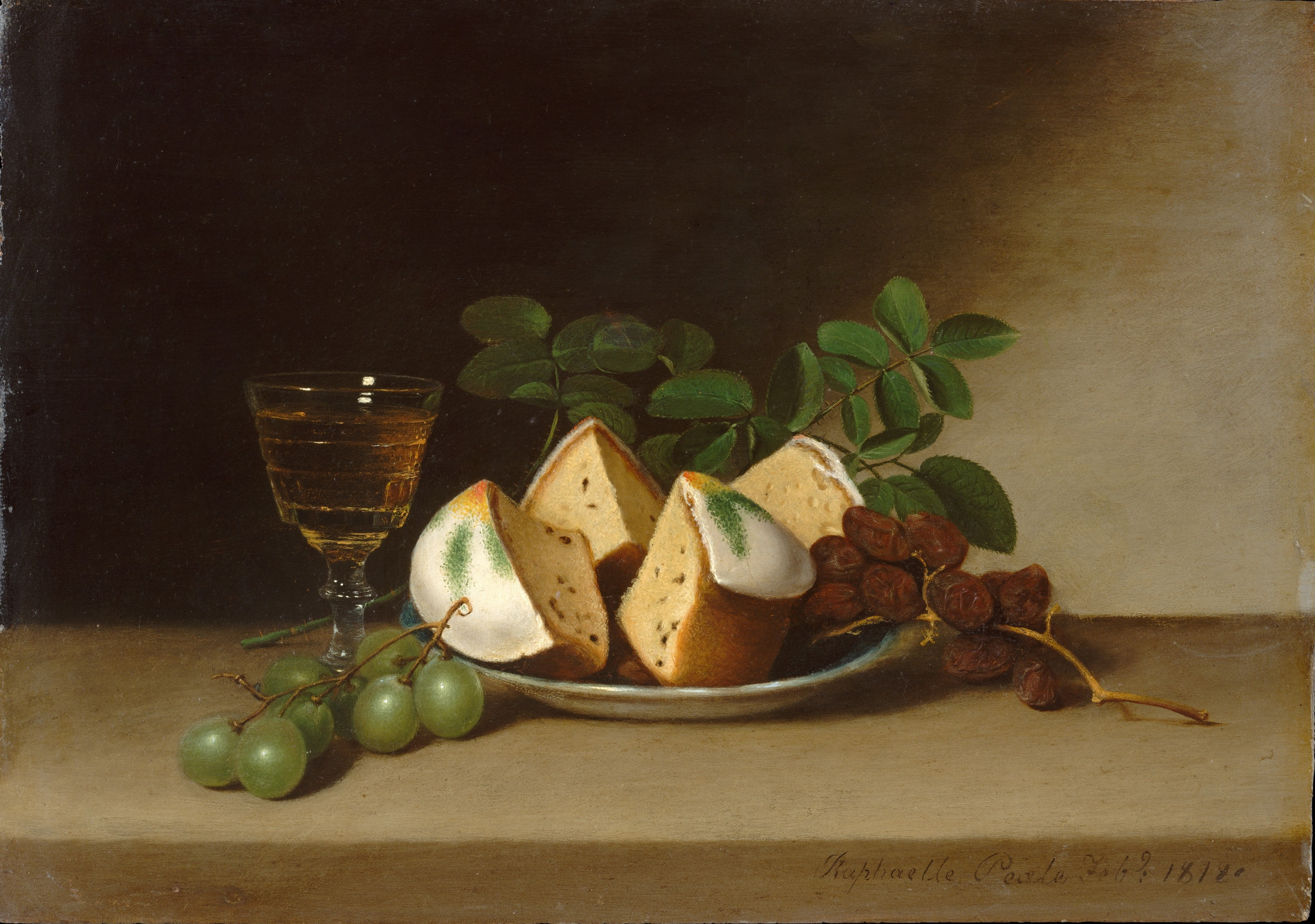
Still Life with Cake, 1818, Metropolitan Museum of Art

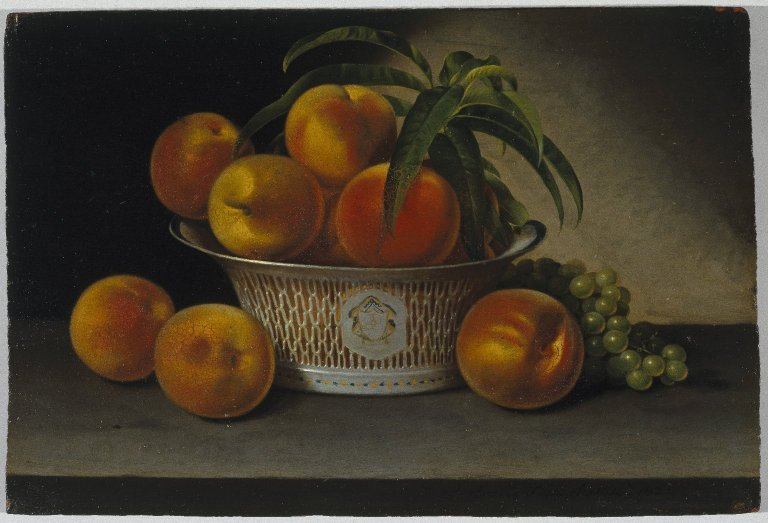
Still Life with Peaches, 1821

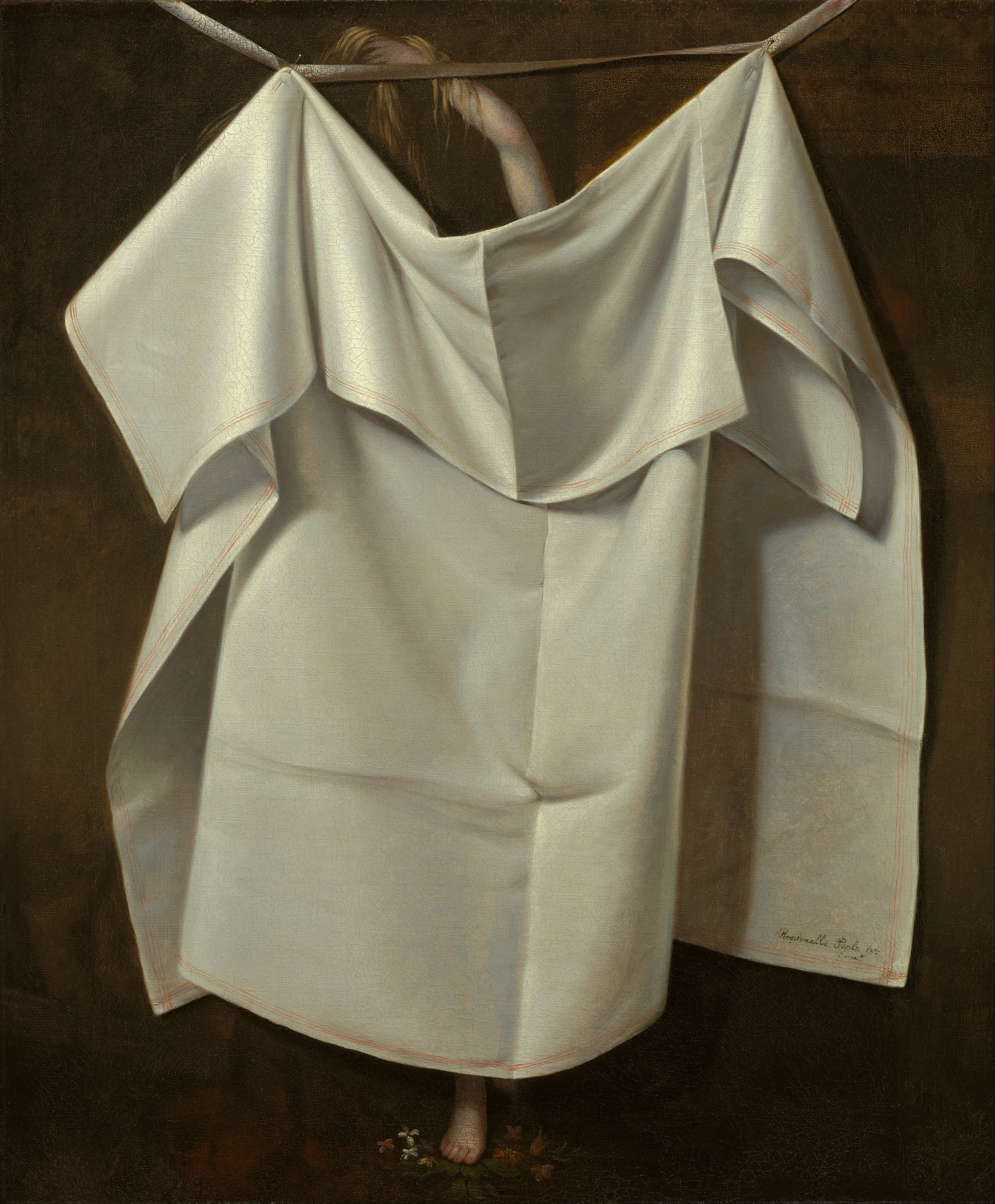
Venus Rising from the Sea – A Deception, 1822

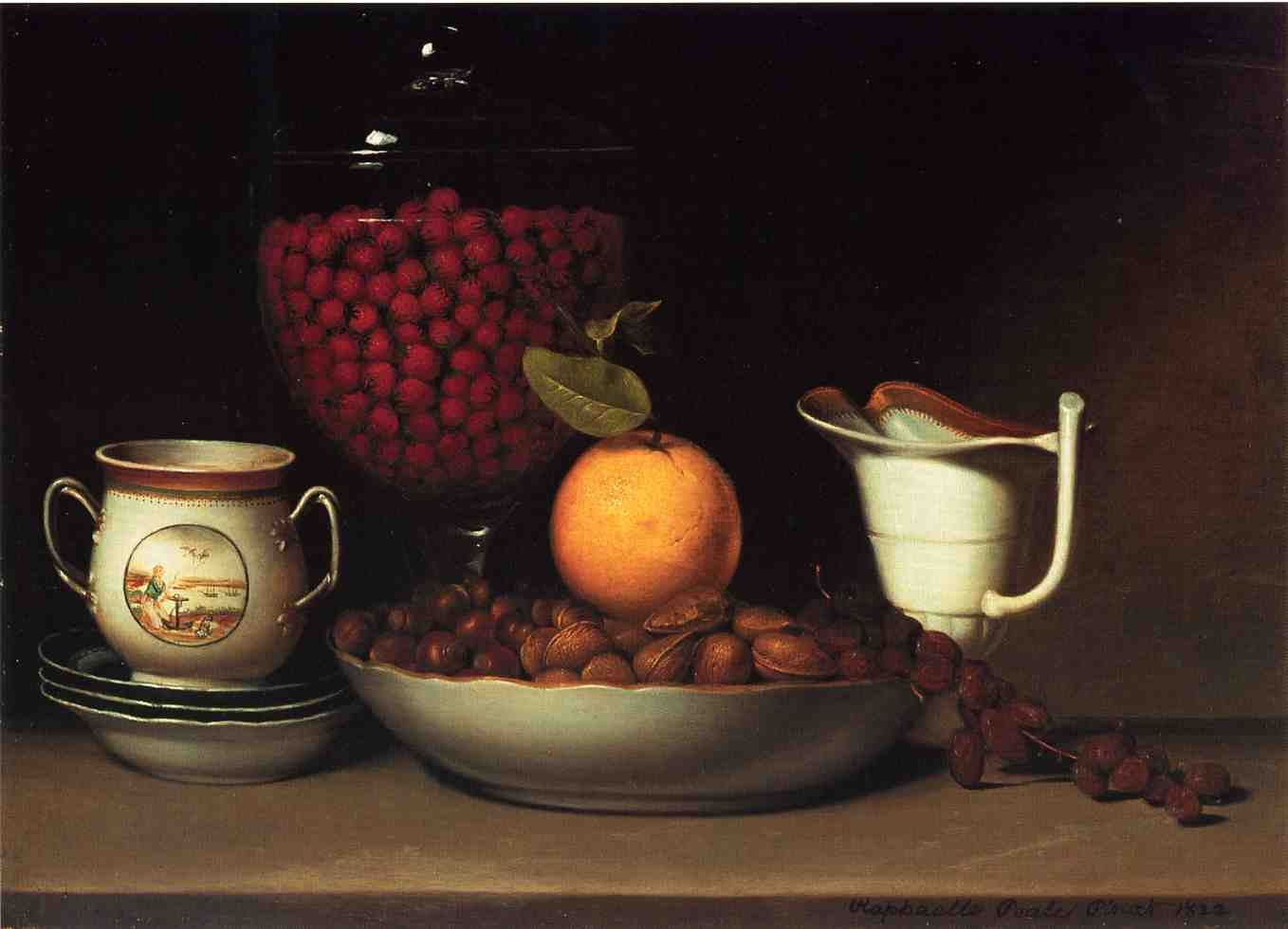
Still Life: Strawberries, Nuts &c., 1822
- Blackberries, c. 1813
- Melons and Morning Glories, 1813
- A Dessert (Still Life with Lemons and Oranges), 1814
- Still Life with Orange and Book, 1815
- Fruit, Pitcher, and Pretzel, unknown
- Bowl of Peaches, 1816
- Still Life with Fruit, Cakes and Wine, 1821
- Still Life with Peaches, 1822
- Lemons and Sugar, unknown
