= Nathaniel Pousette-Dart =

American painter (1886–1965)

Nathaniel Jermund Pousette-Dart (né Pousette; 7 September 1886 – 17 October 1965) was a painter and an art writer from St. Paul, Minnesota. The son of Swedish immigrants Algot Elias Pousette and Mathilda Nilson, he studied painting at the Art Students League in New York City Philadelphia under the painter Robert Henri and at the Academy of Fine Arts.

After he returned to St. Paul he became known for his depictions of Minnesotan landscapes and subjects. His art was described as "Wholly and progressively modern it is, and impressionistic to a degree, yet at bottom it is sane and conservative.". He also wrote articles on art and edited books on the same.

He married Flora Louise Dart on April 16, 1913. Dart was rather progressive in her ideas on marriage and refused to use the conventional vows promising to love, honor, cherish, and obey. She believed marriage should be one of mutual esteem and wrote her own vows reflecting this. After their marriage they combined their last names to form Pousette-Dart. The couple had moved to Valhalla, New York by 1920. Their son Richard Pousette-Dart became a famous artist in his own right.
