= Giovanni Pelliccioli =

Italian surrealist painter

Giovanni Pelliccioli is an Italian surrealist painter. He was born in 1947 at San Pellegrino, Terme, Italy. When he was eight he discovered art and started drawing. At 18 he began art studies at Carrara Academy of Bergame. At this time he painted realist and impressionist style paintings, but when he discovered surrealism he knew it would permit him to give the best of his artistic expression.

Pelliccioli's work continued to evolve and is often divided into three main periods. The 1st Surrealist period was characterized by paintings whose subjects were mostly inspired by Surrealist painters such as Magritte, Salvador Dalì, Max Ernst, Yves Tanguy. The paintings of the 2nd Surrealist period introduce the first signs of Giovanni Pelliccioli's own Surrealism, as he gave birth to new spiritual conceptions and new symbolic object leitmotifs. With his 3rd Surrealist period, the artist introduced some innovative ways of expression. In fact, it is the most creative period of his career, irony is the main theme. This is also the time when the artist started using new materials such as wood, metal, glass and other natural objects (leaf skeletons, stones) that gave his works a new sculptural dimension. The «trompe-l'œil» effect will also be a recurring game.

In 1993, Pelliccioli created a new form in the world of the artistic painting - the "triangle". It is a picture cut in a diagonal with a three-dimensional definition. It is a picture cut in a diagonal with a three-demensional definition. Whether oil on canvas of oil on wood a "trompe I'oeil" sensation is accomplished. A represented subject is half painted (unreal) and half coming out (real). This exclusive idea is patented by the artist.

Since then he has worked as a professional surrealist painter. In 40 years he has painted more than 4200 paintings. Pelliccioli's work is presented in more than 100 exhibitions around the world.

He is listed in the World Cultural Union at: The Museum of Modern Art (New York), the Tate Gallery (London), Galerie des 20 Jahrhunderts (Berlin), the Tokio Kukuritisu Kindai Bkjutsukan (Tokia), the National Gallery of Canada (Ottawa), the Musee d’Art Moderne (Paris), the Kunsthaus (Zurich), the National Gallery of Victoria (Australia), the National Museum (Stockholm), the Galleria Nacional de Arte Moderna (Buenos Aires), the National Gallery of Art (Hilton of Athens), the Country Museum of Art (Los Angeles) and many others.

Pelliccioli left Italy in 1993 and established himself in France at Antibes (French Riviera). He got his own workplace there. He died in 2016.

== Personal exhibitions ==
Year	Country	Place
1968	Italy	Town Hall exhibition (Ponte S. Pietro)
1969	Italy	Hotel des Alpes (Foppolo)
1969	Italy	Town Hall exhibition (Ponte S. Pietro)
1970	Italy	Grand Hotel (San Pellegrino)
1971	Italy	Hotel des Alpes (Foppolo)
1971	Italy	Town Excelsior San Marco art Gallery (Bergamo)
1972	Italy	Fondazione Europa art Gallery (Milan)
1973	Italy	La Torre art Gallery (Bergamo)
1973	Italy	Cristallo art Gallery (Cortina d'Ampezzo)
1974	Italy	Manzoni art Gallery (Milan)
1974	Italy	Duomo Gallery (Desenzano del Garda)
1975	Switzerland	Motte Gallery (Geneva)
1975	France	Des Etats Units (Cannes)
1975	Italy	Quaglino art Gallery (Turin)
1975	France	22 Rue Bonaparte (Paris)
1976	Italy	Cristallo art Gallery (Cortina d'Ampezzo)
1976	France	Des Etats Units (Cannes)
1977	Italy	Comanducci International art Gallery (Milan)
1977	Italy	Ghiggini art Gallery (Varese)
1977	Italy	International art Center (Rome)
1978	Italy	Michelangelo art Gallery (Bergamo)
1979	Italy	Il Portichetto Gallery (Stresa)
1979	Italy	La Firma (Riva del Garda)
1980	Italy	Il Setaccio Gallery (Sestri Levante)
1980	Italy	La Garrita art Gallery (Bergamo)
1981	Italy	Jordan's club Gallery (Gorla Minore)
1981	Italy	Nuova Mutina art Gallery (Modena)
1982	Italy	Quaglino Gallery (Turin)
1982	Italy	Aquarius Gallery (Cremona)
1982	Italy	XX Settembre Gallery (Bergamo)
1983	Netherlands	Volksuniverstiteit Gallery (Rotterdam)
1984	Italy	La Garrita Gallery (Bergamo)
1984	Italy	Rocca di Angera
1984	Italy	Nuova Mutina Gallery (Modena)
1986	Italy	Hotel Excelsior San Marco (Bergamo)
1987	Italy	La Cornice Gallery (desenzano del Garda)
1987	Italy	San Stefano Gallery (Venice)
1988	Italy	Palazzo dei Congressi (Madonna di Campiglio)
1988	Germany	Buro K. Grunzing (Frankfurt)
1989	Yugoslavia	Muzej Grada Trogira (Trogir)
1990	France	Nicole Sandor Gallery (Fontgombault Loire)
1990	Italy	Hotel Excelsior S. Marco (Bergamo)
1993	Italy	Parish Recreational Center (Mozzo)
1993	France	B.N.P. (Antibes)
1994	France	Hotel Martinez (Cannes)
1994	Germany	Les Beaux Artes Gallery (Düsseldorf)
1995	France	De Carmes Gallery (Rouen)
1995	France	B.N.P. (Paris)
1996	Germany	Hotel Holiday Inn(Frankfurt)
1996	Norway	Interior-Galleriet (Oslo)
1996	France	musée Naval Napoleonien (Antibes)
1997	Germany	Exposition Salo BMW (Usingen)
1999	France	Les Bain Douches (Antibes)
1999	France	Chateau du Pont de la Meurthe (Nancy)
1999	France	Chateau de Trousse Barriere (Orleans)
1999	Italy	Centro Parrochiale Mozzo (Bergamo)
2000	France	La conca verde (Ivrea)
2000	Italy	EUR 2000 (Rome)
2000	France	Centre International d'Art Modern (Nice)
2000	Italy	Valpelline le lievre amoureux (Aosta)
2001	France	Chateau de Saint Max (Nantes)
2001	Norway	Interior Galleriet (Oslo)
2001	France	Amadeus (Sophia Antipolis)
2001	Italy	Sala Civica di Via Piatti (Ponte San Pietro)
2001	Italy	Palazzo Boselli (San Giovanni Bianco)
2001	Italy	Sala Civica Carlo Cattaneo (Curno)
2002	Italy	Capella de Lourdes (Mozzo)
2003	Italy	Hotel Cappello d'Oro(Bergamo)
2004	France	Chateau de Saint Max (Nancy)
2004	Italy	Selvino
2005	Italy	Galleria Ponte Vecchio (Florence)
2006	Norway	Interior Galleriet (Oslo)
2006	Italy	Serina
2007	France	Chateau de Saint Max (Nancy)
2008	Italy	Proloco (Piazza Brembana)
2009	France	Mairie du 7e Arrondissement (Paris)
2009	Italy	Casino (San Pellegrino Terme)
2009	Italy	Museo della Valle (Zogno)
2010	Italy	Monastero del Lavello (Calolziocorte)
2011	France	Aeroporte Côte d'Azur (Nice)
2011	France	Salon Tous a l'Art (Nice)
2012	America	Artexpo (New York)
2023	Germany	Musikstudio und Galerie: Gabriele Paqué (Bonn)

== CD covers ==
A couple of paintings is used for classic music.

Name painting	CD
Fire island	Gabriel Fauré Requiem (1893 VERSION)
Where the future starts	French Orchestral Miniatures 1850 - 1950 VOL. I
The dream of a navigator	French Orchestral Miniatures 1850 - 1950 VOL. II
Sunrise of Civilization	French Orchestral Miniatures 1850 - 1950 VOL. III
A travel in the Abyss	The French Flute 1920 – 1930
The big mental game	Tchaikovsky: The Seasons Premier Trio Moscow
The wind over the sea	Peter Erasmus Lange-Müller

== Books ==
Name of the book	Summary
Il suo mondo magico	Monograph published for the exhibition in Milan 1977. Private Edition of 500 ex. numbered and signed by the Artist.
Beyond the realm of thoughts	Artist's autobiography In four editions : English, German, Italian and French
[Pelliccioli]	Review in four languages : English, German, Italian and French
