= Baltimore Museum =

The Baltimore Museum may refer to:

- Baltimore Museum and Gallery of Fine Arts
- Baltimore Museum of Art
- Baltimore Museum of Industry
- Peale Museum
