= Moses Williams =

Moses Williams may refer to:

- Moses Williams (antiquarian) (1685-1742)
- Moses Williams (artist) (1777-c. 1825)
- Moses Williams (crime victim) (d. 2014)
- Moses Williams (Medal of Honor) (1845-1899)
