= Museum shop =

Gift shop in a museum

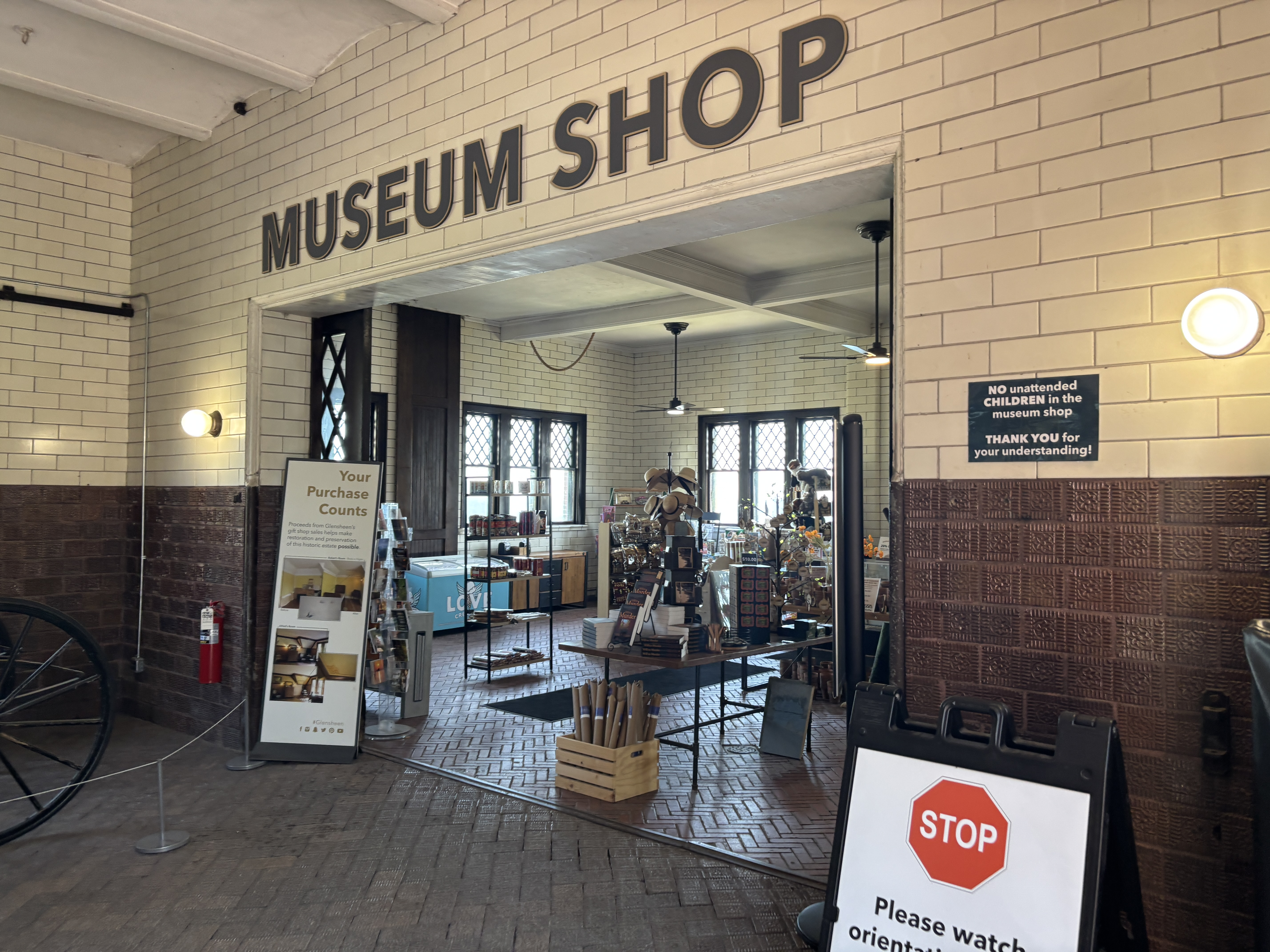
Entrance to a museum gift store

A museum shop or museum store is a gift shop attached to a museum. Typical offerings include reproductions of works in the museum, picture postcards, books related to the museum's collections, and various kinds of souvenirs. Art museums often include clothing and decorative objects inspired by or copying artwork. Science museums often include educational toys.

Museum shops are often placed near the entrance or the exit. Temporary special exhibitions often have their own shops. Museum shops are often important sources of revenue for museums as public funding diminishes, and museum professionals often consider them as important elements of visitor education.

Some museum shops function as specialist bookshops, selling publications of the museum, including exhibition catalogues; collection and visitor guides; reference books; and other publications related to the museum’s collections, exhibitions, and institutional history.

The concept of a museum gift store originated in 1802 at Charles Willson Peale's museum in Philadelphia, where visitors purchased custom-made silhouette portraits for eight cents, created onsite by Moses Williams, an African-American artist who had once been an enslaved person of Peale’s. Peale's shop set the precedent for cultural souvenirs, which evolved into the retail shops present in modern museums. In the United States, museum shops developed after the Second World War. At first, they were often small and not professionally managed. They became important revenue generators in the 1980s.

Museum shops have become an important element of visitors' perceptions of museums. Indeed, some studies show that visitors spend more time at the shop, the café, and so on, than with the exhibits.

Some writers on museums take an anti-commercialization position and criticize shops as undermining the cultural value of the museum.

== Bibliography ==
- Theobald, Mary Miley (2000). Museum Store Management. ISBN 074250431X.
- Museum Store Association (U.S.), ed. (2024). Museum store: the manager's guide: basic guidelines for the new museum store manager (Fifth ed.). Rowman & Littlefield Publishers. ISBN 978-1-5381-8533-9.
