= John E. Owens =

American actor (1823–1886)

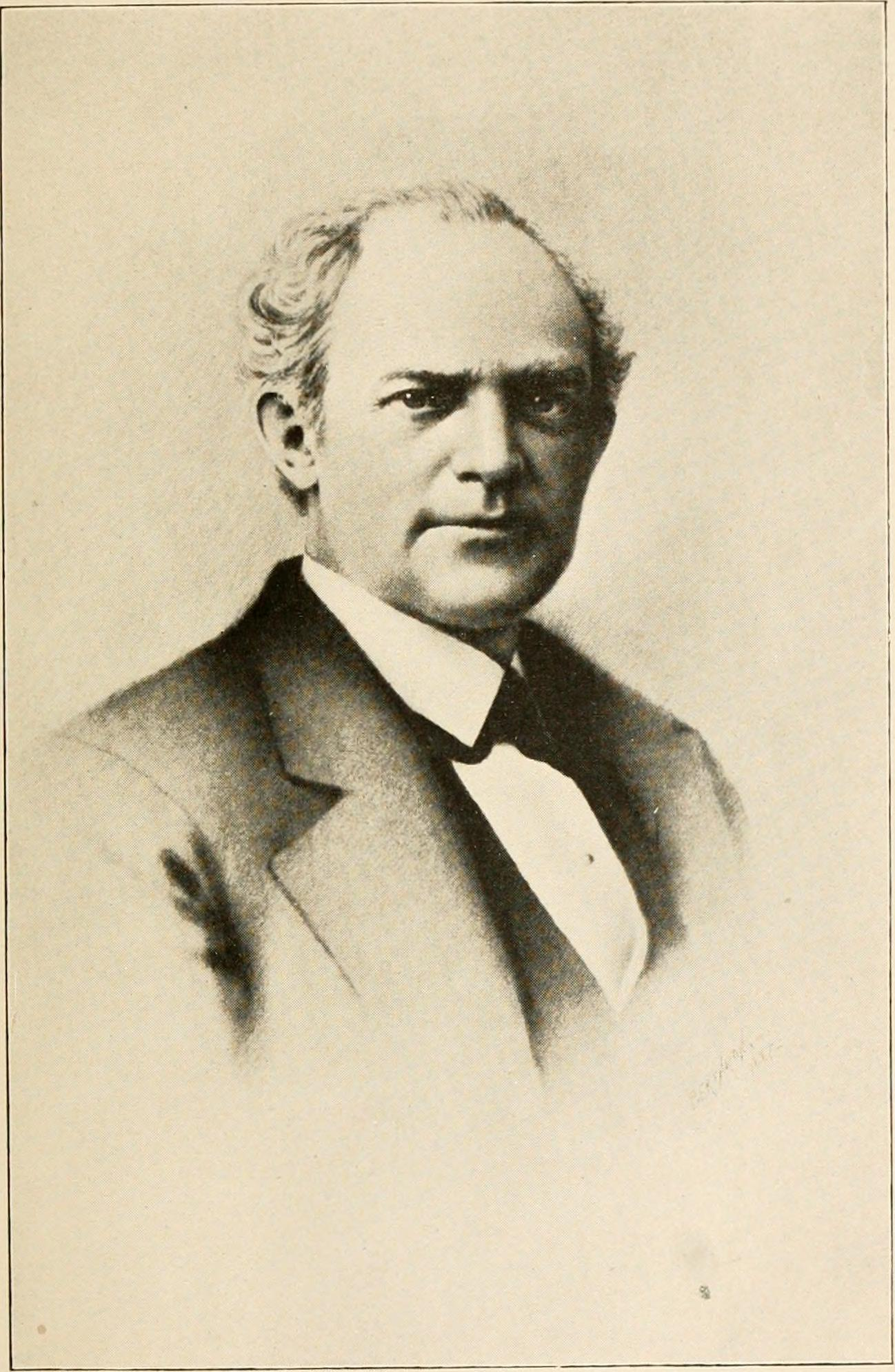
- John E. Owens
- Born: 1823; Liverpool, England United Kingdom
- Died: 7 December 1886 (age 63 ) Towson, Maryland, United States

John Edward (or Edmund) Owens (2 April 1823 in Liverpool – 7 December 1886 in Maryland) was an English-American comedian, born in the Aigburth district of Liverpool, England but taken to the United States when three years old. He began his stage career in 1841 in Philadelphia. In 1844 he was engaged at the Baltimore Museum and Gallery of Fine Arts (BMGFA), and after a three-year absence returned to that theatre where he was a frequent performer in the late 1840s. He purchased the BMGFA from P.T. Barnum in 1850, only to sell it a year later to Henry C. Jarrett.

Owens was a popular comedian whose regular repertory included about fifty parts and who earned a fortune. His Solon Shingle (1864) was famous both in the United States and in England; among his other favorite characters were Dr. Pangloss (in George Colman the Younger's The Heir at Law), Caleb Plummer in stage adaptations of Charles Dickens's The Cricket on the Hearth, and the old man (Elbert Rogers) in Esmeralda, in which he last appeared in New York. He was both humorist and a comedian. John E. Owens, describing the conduct of a bee in an empty molasses barrel, once threw a circle of his hearers almost into convulsions of laughter. He died at his home, Aigburth Vale near Towson, Maryland, 7 December 1886.

Owens was the first East Coast actor to tour to San Francisco's California Theatre in 1869 after completion. He then made an arduous journey to perform in Virginia City in his most popular productions. According to Owens' wife, he found the mining camp theater inadequate to stage his productions.
