= Nathan Dunn =

American businessman, philanthropist and sinologist

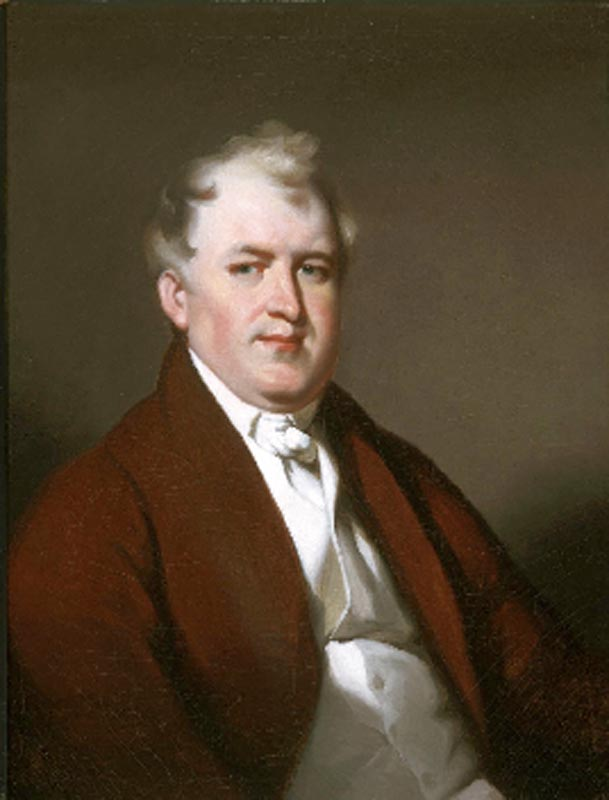
- Portrait of Dunn by George Chinnery, 1830s
- Born: November 11, 1782; Pilesgrove Township, New Jersey, U.S.
- Died: September 19, 1844 (aged 61); Vevey, Switzerland
- Resting place: Laurel Hill Cemetery, Philadelphia, Pennsylvania, U.S.
- Occupations: Businessman, Chinese artifact collector

Nathan Dunn (November 11, 1782 – September 19, 1844) was an American businessman, philanthropist and sinology pioneer who accumulated a large collection of Chinese artifacts while running a trade business in Canton, China for 12 years. In 1838, he created the first systematic collection of Chinese materials exhibited publicly in the United States at the Chinese Museum in Philadelphia. The exhibit toured London in 1842 and 1851 and was auctioned off to various collectors after Dunn's death.

== Biography ==
=== Early life ===
Dunn was born on November 11, 1783, in Pilesgrove Township, New Jersey, one of 5 children in the farming family of Nathan Dunn and Rhoda, née Silvers. His father died in 1782 at the age of 39. In 1788, Rhoda married Thomas Osborn and had three more children, of them Rhoda Osborn married Restore S. Lamb. Rhoda and Restore S. Lamb were noted ministers of the Religious Society of Friends.

=== Trading company ===
In 1816, Dunn was disowned by Philadelphia Monthly Meeting of the Society of Friends for bankruptcy. However, John Field, one of his creditors, proposed a way for Dunn to pay down debt through the creation of a joint business and a post in China.

In 1818 Dunn went to Canton, China and started the Nathan Dunn & Company trading business. Except for a visit to England in 1820-1821, he lived and worked there for 12 years buying tea and nankeen and selling specially produced British goods. Dunn designed an innovative triangular shipping pattern; American goods were shipped to Britain, profit from the sale of those good were used to purchase British goods popular in China; the British goods were shipped to Canton and exchanged for Chinese goods; the Chinese good were then shipped to America.

Dunn's year-round residence in China was a strategic advantage since it allowed him to out bid competitors on silk products before the other traders arrived in China for the tea season trading. He strictly abstained from the opium trade, a common profitable business of the time. His compliance with the Chinese anti-opium laws was one of the things that created a good reputation for him among his Chinese partners including Houqua, Tinqua and other Hong merchants. During the disastrous November 1822 fire at Canton warehouses, Tinqua sent eighty workers and multiple boats to rescue merchandise from Dunn's warehouse while competitors suffered huge losses. Before leaving China, Dunn's wealth was estimated to be $200,000. He returned to Philadelphia in 1832, and brought with him a large collection of Chinese artistic and cultural objects and paid off all of his creditors.

=== Chinese Museum ===
The Philadelphia Museum, created by Charles Willson Peale, appointed Dunn to its board of directors in 1836. He invested in the new museum building and as a result for a limited time he was free to use the first floor of the building for his own museum.

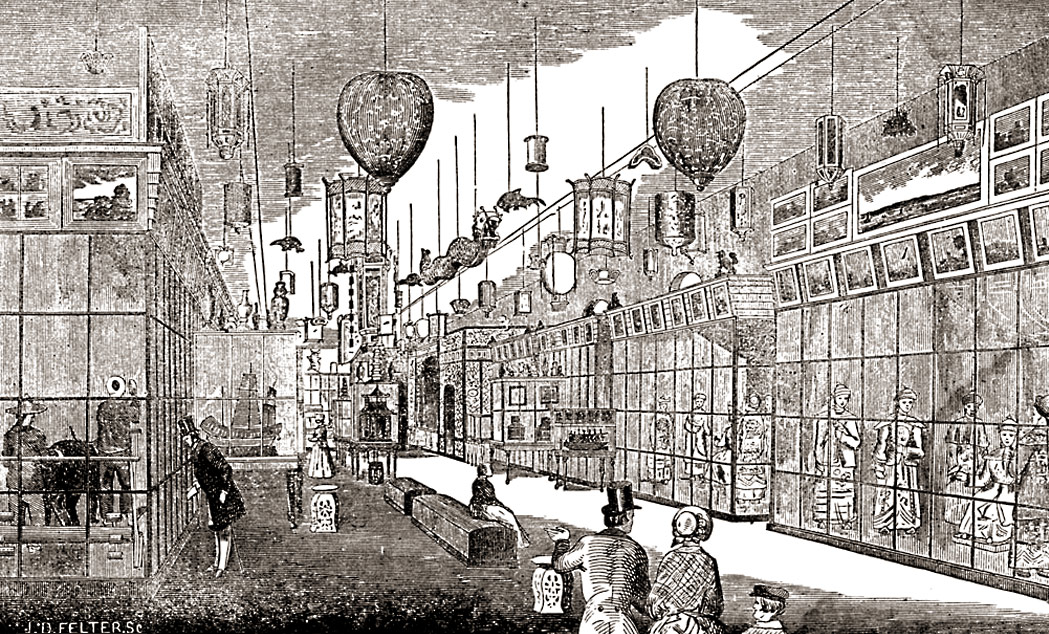
Ten Thousand Chinese Things exhibit

In 1838, he opened the “Chinese Museum” in Philadelphia, with an accompanying 120-page catalog, Ten Thousand Chinese Things. It was the first systematic collection of Chinese material exhibited publicly in the United States. 100,000 visitors saw it in Philadelphia. Despite the large number of attendees, the exhibit was not a financial success in Philadelphia and in 1842 Dunn brought the exhibit, known as The Chinese Collection, to London to expand the scope of people who could observe it and to highlight Chinese culture in an attempt to thwart the opium trade. The collection was displayed in a pagoda-like exhibition hall designed by John Notman at Hyde Park Corner. An estimated 100,000 people viewed the exhibit in London including a young Queen Victoria. 70,000 to 80,000 catalogs describing the exhibit were sold in the U.S. and England.

Apart from artifacts, the museum had life-size clay figures accurately modeled after about 50 real Chinese acquaintances personally selected by Dunn, representing variety of social positions, occupations etc., standing against dioramas, and extensive annotations of the exhibits.

=== Later life ===
Dunn was a supporter of several charities. In 1840 he gave a gift of over $20,000 to Haverford College. He built a "Chinese cottage" in Mount Holly, New Jersey, which for many years was run by his half-sisters Phoebe and Rhoda. He was elected a member of the American Philosophical Society and joined the Academy of Natural Sciences. He was director of the Philadelphia House of Refuge and worked with other charitable institutions such as the Pennsylvania Institute for the Instruction of the Blind, the indigent Widows and Single Women's Society, African colonization societies and prison reform societies.

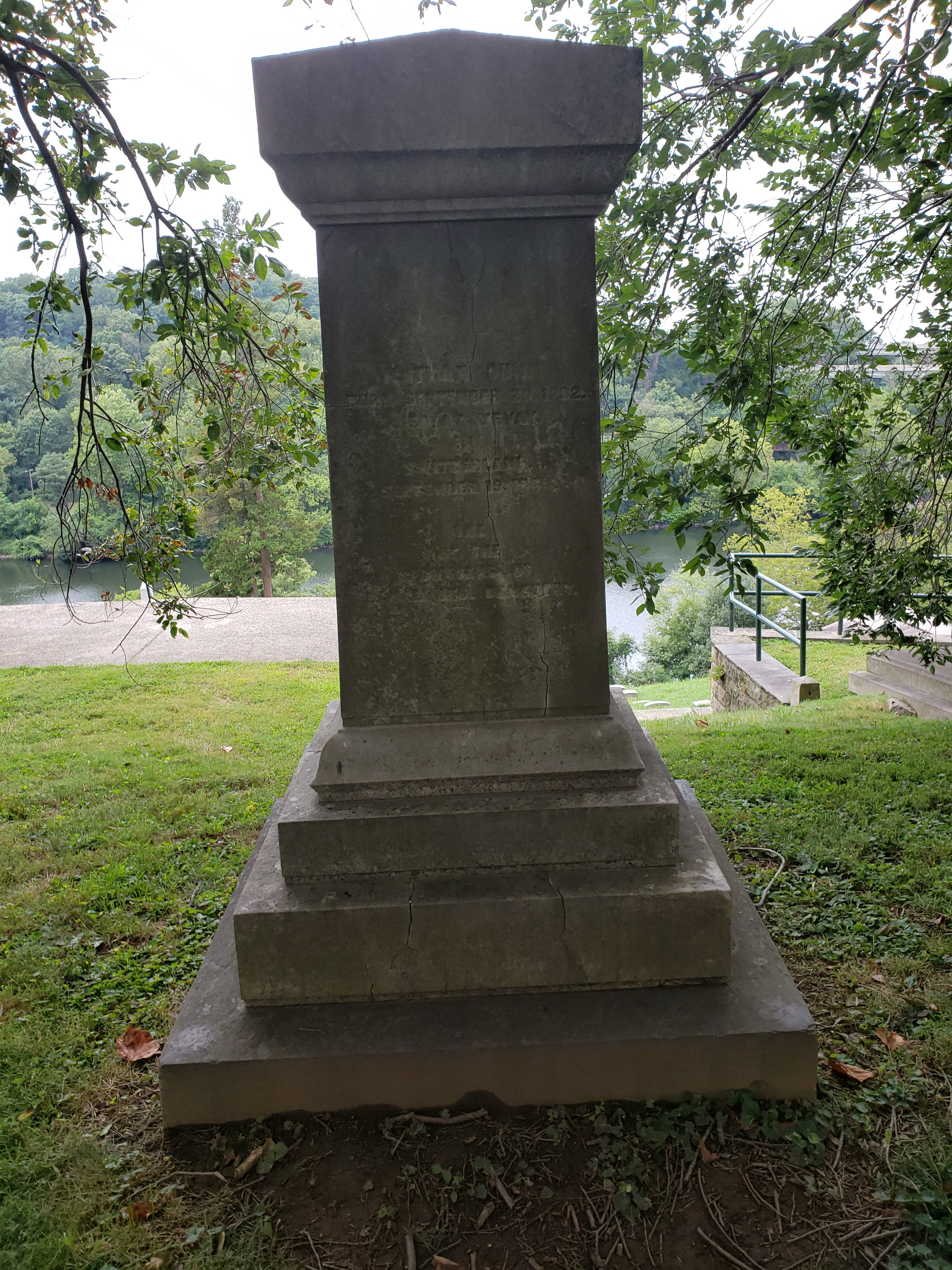
Nathan Dunn tombstone in Laurel Hill Cemetery

Dunn died of malaria on September 19, 1844, in Vevey, Switzerland. His remains were returned to the US and he was interred at Laurel Hill Cemetery in Philadelphia. Dunn's assets could not cover the generous bequests of his will and the collections was exhibited throughout England in an attempt to raise money. His partners brought his Chinese Collection to London once again in 1851, to coincide with the Great International Exhibition. This time the collection was largely ignored, and much of it was auctioned at Christie’s in December of that year. Some of the collection was purchased by P.T. Barnum and displayed at this museum in New York.

== Sources ==
- Blackman, Leah (1963) [1880]. History of Little Egg Harbor Township, Burlington County, NJ: From Its First Settlement to the Present Time, Comprising the Genealogy of Many of Its Inhabitants, Together with Short Biographies of Eminent Characters and Most Events Worthy of Remembrance. Tuckerton, New Jersey: Great John Mathis Foundation – via Internet Archive.
- Haddad, John Rogers (2008). The Romance of China: Excursions to China in U.S. Culture, 1776–1876. Columbia University Press. ISBN 9780231130943.
- Hummel, Arthur W. (Spring 1970). "Nathan Dunn". Quaker History. 59 (1): 34–39. doi:10.1353/qkh.1970.0018. JSTOR 41946615. S2CID 201774371.
- Langdon, Wm. B. (1842). "Ten Thousand Chinese Things": A Descriptive Catalogue of the Chinese Collection, Now Exhibiting at St. George's Place, Hyde Park Corner, London, with Condensed Accounts of the Genius, Government, History, Literature, Agriculture, Arts, Trade, Manners, Customs and Social Life of the People of the Celestial Empire – via Google Books.
- Van Dyke, Paul A.; Schopp, Susan E. (2018). The Private Side of the Canton Trade, 1700–1840: Beyond the Companies. Hong Kong University Press. ISBN 978-988-8390-93-9 – via Google Books.
- Wilkinson, Nancy B. (February 18, 2009). "The Chinese Collection of Nathan Dunn: Its Origin, Travels and Influence on the Arts of Britain". The International Journal of the Arts in Society: Annual Review. 3 (4): 61–70. doi:10.18848/1833-1866/CGP/v03i04/35503.
