= Baltimore Museum and Gallery of Fine Arts =

Former theatre and dime museum in Baltimore, Maryland

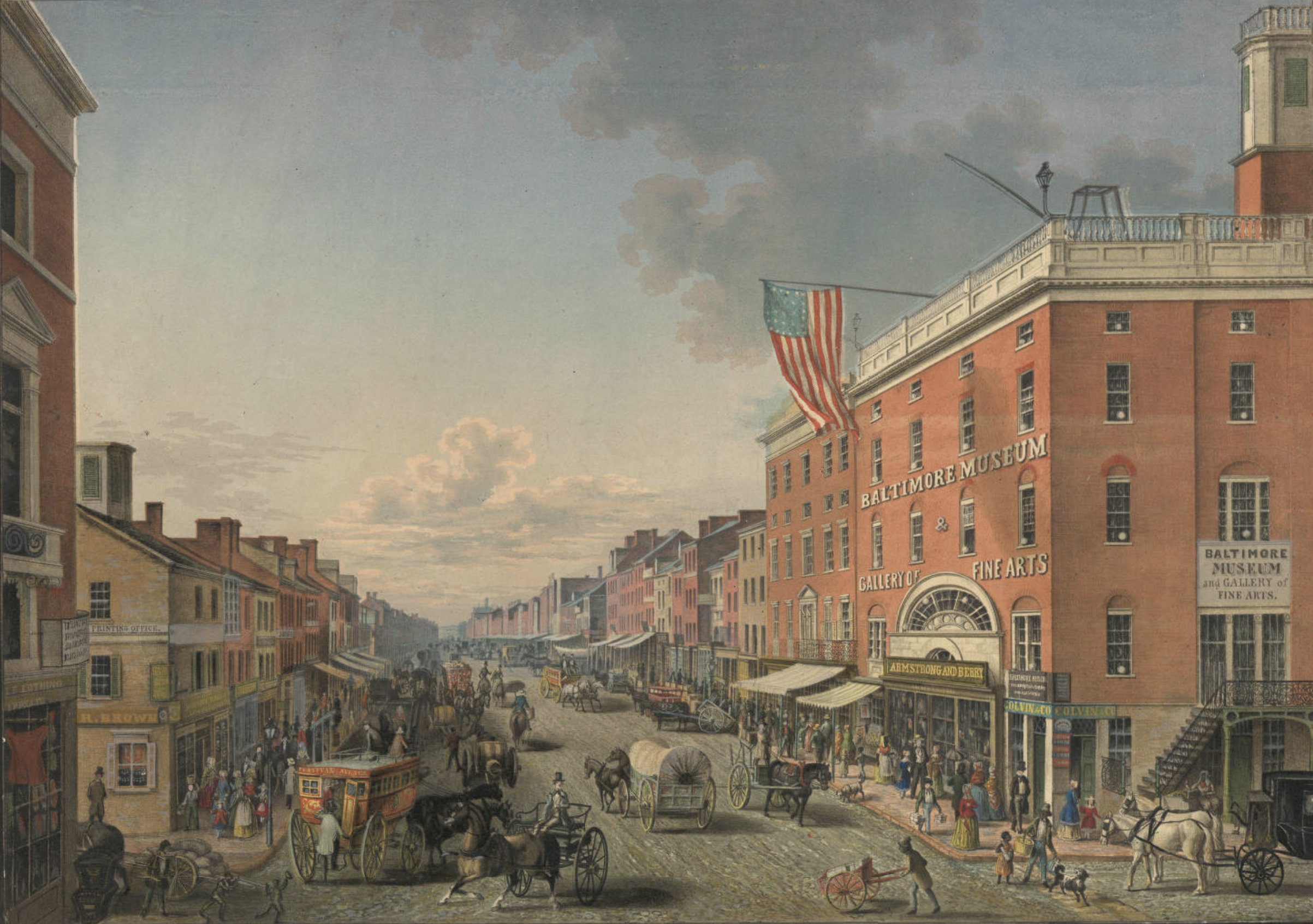
1850 lithograph of the Baltimore Museum and Gallery of Fine Arts

The Baltimore Museum and Gallery of Fine Arts, sometimes referred to as the Baltimore Museum Theatre or simply the Baltimore Museum, was a theatre and dime museum in Baltimore, Maryland, United States, located at the corners of Baltimore and Calvert streets. It was originally the second location of Rubens Peale's Baltimore Museum which occupied the second floor of the building beginning in January 1830. In 1834, it was renamed the Baltimore Museum and Gallery of Fine Arts after the enterprise was taken over by Edmund Peale, the nephew of Rubens. Edmund operated the business until it was purchased by P. T. Barnum in 1845. In 1847, the building underwent a major reconstruction to turn it into a proper theatre venue. After this, it was often referred to as the Baltimore Museum Theatre. In 1861, the theatre came under the management of George Kunkel who re-named the venue Kunkel's Ethiopian Opera House. After Kunkel left in 1864, the venue was used more as a bar and place for public dances rather than a theatre. It was destroyed by fire on December 12, 1873.

== Baltimore Museum at Holliday Street ==
In 1814, the artist Rembrandt Peale established "Peale's Baltimore Museum and Gallery of Paintings" on Holliday Street in Baltimore. The collection included some 40 portraits, together with natural history specimens, including the skeleton of a mastodon, which his father, Charles Willson Peale, had excavated in 1801. Rembrandt's father had opened his own Philadelphia Museum in 1784. In 1822 Rembrandt transferred the museum to his brother Rubens.

== Baltimore Museum at Calvert and Baltimore Streets ==
By January 1830, the entire collection of the Baltimore Museum had been moved by Rubens Peale from its original building at 225 North Holliday Street to a recently erected building at the corner of Calvert and Baltimore streets. The building was built and owned by John Clark who used the lower floor of the structure to sell state lottery tickets. Clark rented the upper floors to Rubens, who continued to operate the museum from this location. While admission to the museum cost a quarter, the museum was essentially a dime museum in that it contained many items that were in the collection not because of any real artistic or historical value, but for their novelty appeal. Like other dime museums, it also featured a "lecture room" that presented a wide range of changing entertainment, from plays to music groups and different types of variety theatre such as ventriloquists and magicians. One item on display was George Washington's shaving brush.

In February 1833, the museum was severely damaged by fire. The consequences were that the "Anatomical Cabinet" containing wax models, in the fifth story, was destroyed; the "curiosities" in the fourth story were destroyed or damaged; the "Gallery of Paintings" in the third story was saved; and the contents of the second story were largely saved.

== Baltimore Museum and Gallery of Fine Arts ==
In 1834, Rubens's nephew, Edmund Peale, acquired the museum from his uncle and renamed it the Baltimore Museum and Gallery of Fine Arts (BMGFA). The venue continued to operate as a dime museum under Edmund's management. By the late 1830s, advertisements for BMGFA were using the word vaudeville to promote its variety theatre performances. These are among the earliest uses of the term vaudeville. One act featured a professor of chemistry and the "Pyrotechnic Arts" where a living rabbit was allowed to die inside a heated oven, followed by the placement of a live dog in the same oven, only for it to be miraculously saved by the professor's miracle formula. The same formula allegedly saved a man who drank poison in front of the audience.

In 1845, Edmund Peale sold the BMGFA to P. T. Barnum, and the building underwent a major reconstruction to turn it into a proper professional theatre venue in 1847. After this, it was often referred to as the Baltimore Museum Theatre. The actor John E. Owens was a member of the company of players at the BMGFA in 1844 and returned in 1847; performing often at the BMGFA in the late 1840s. In 1850, he purchased the BMGFA from Barnum, only to sell it a year later to Henry C. Jarrett. Other actors who were active at the BMGFA in the 1840s and 1850s included Junius Brutus Booth, Charlotte Cushman, Edward Loomis Davenport, Edwin Forrest, Joseph Jefferson, Charles Kean, Ellen Kean, Kate Ludlow, Charles Macready, James Murdock, Fanny Wallack, and James William Wallack.

In 1861, the BMGFA came under the management George Kunkel who renamed the venue Kunkel's Ethiopian Opera House. Kunkel and his minstrel show, Kunkel's Nightingales, were active at the theatre until 1864, when they relocated to the Front Street Theatre. After this, the venue became more of a bar and space for public dances than a theatre, although it never completely stopped offering live entertainment of one form or another. While hosting a public dance on December 12, 1873, a fire began on the fourth floor of the building. It spread and destroyed the entire structure.
