= Gift shop =

Store primarily selling items intended to be used as souvenirs

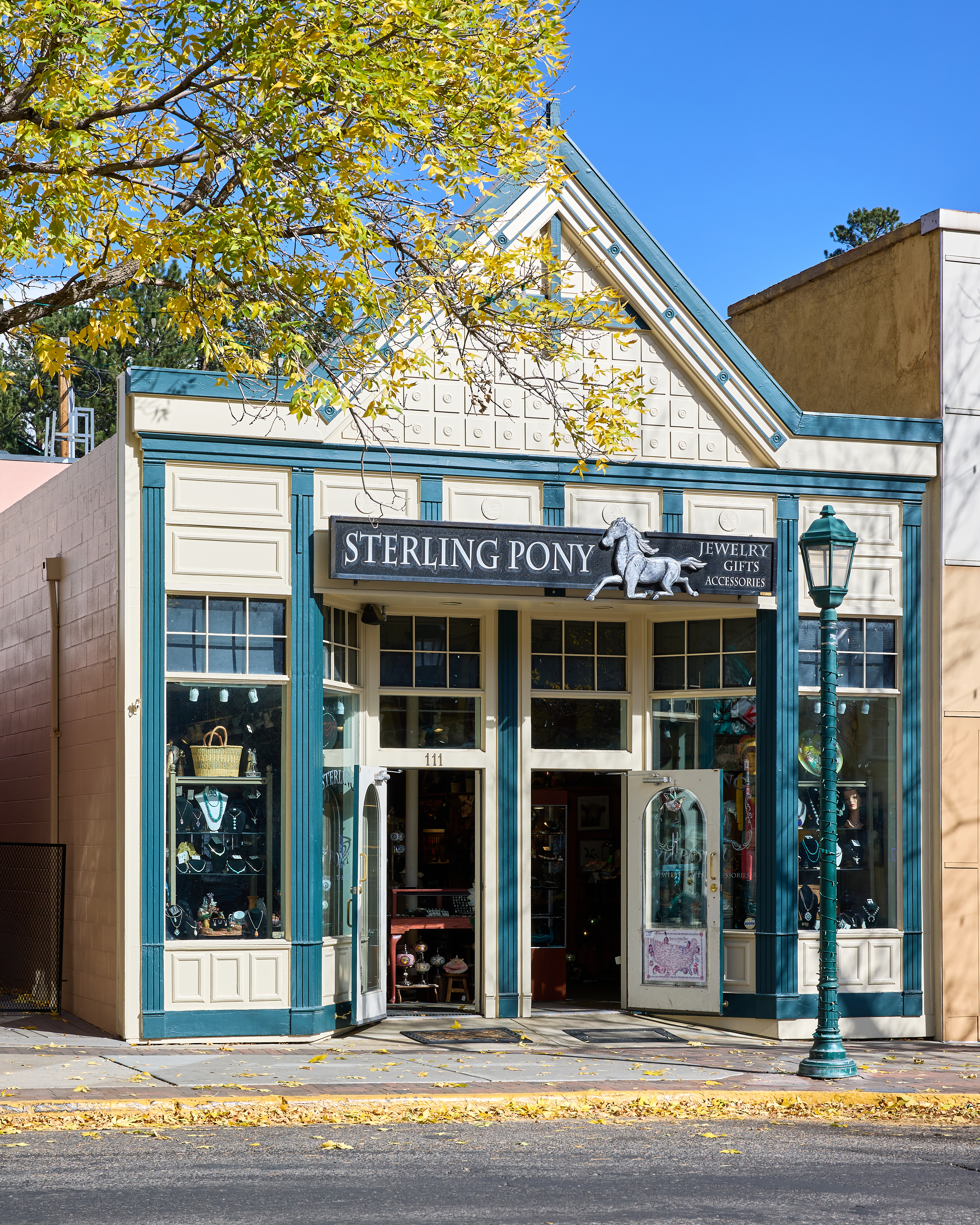
Gift shop in Estes Park, Colorado

A gift shop or souvenir shop is a store primarily selling souvenirs, memorabilia, and other items relating to a particular topic or theme. The items sold often include coffee mugs, stuffed animals, toys, t-shirts, postcards, handmade collections and other souvenirs, intended to be kept by the buyer as a memento of their visit, or given to another as a gift.

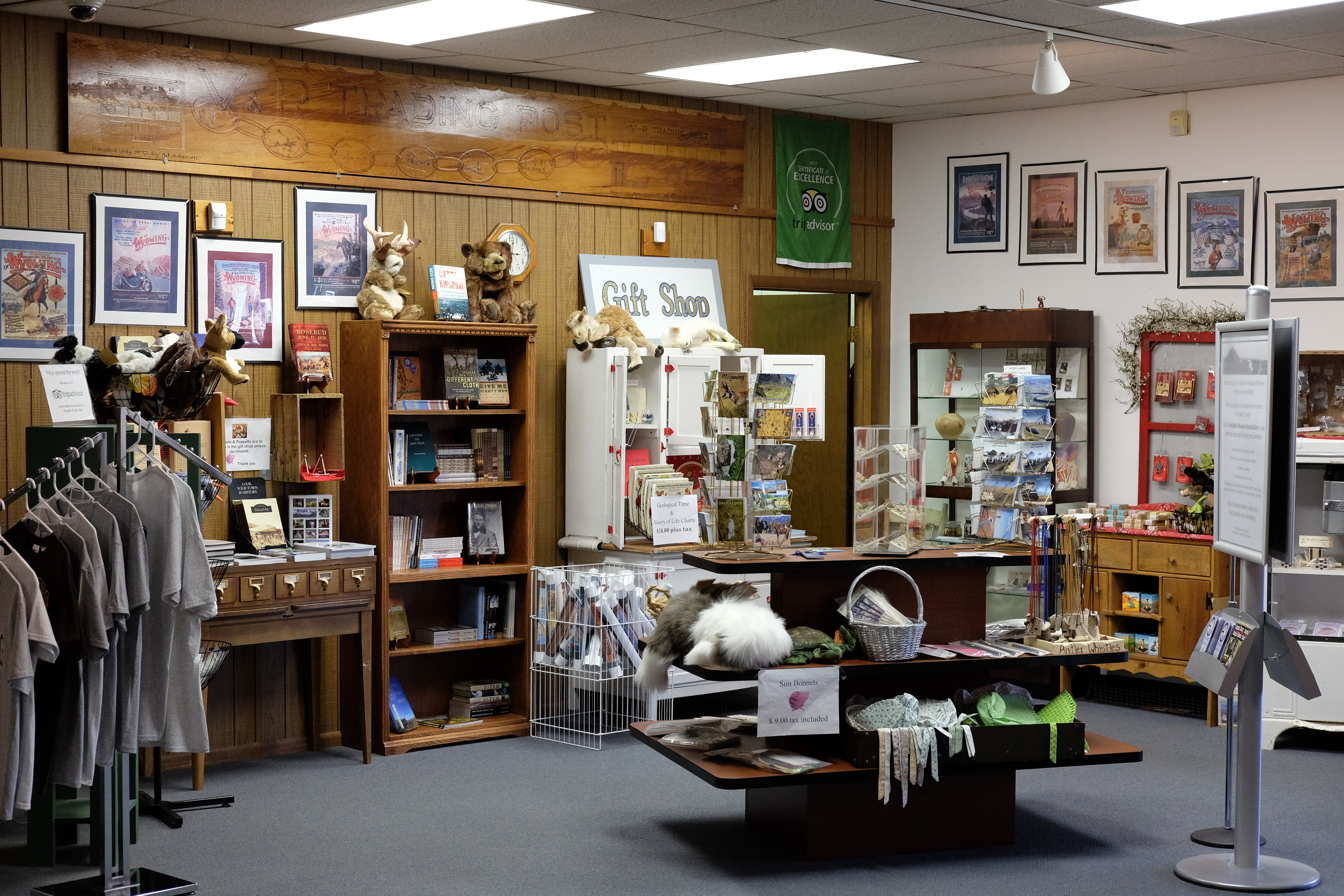
Campbell County Rockpile Museum gift shop in Gillette, Wyoming

Gift shops are normally found in areas visited by many tourists. Hotels and motels often feature a gift shop near their entrance. Venues such as zoos, aquariums, national parks, theme parks, and museums have their own gift shops as well; in some cases, these shops sell items of higher value than gift shops not associated with a venue, as well as trinkets. These stores are sometimes a source of financial support for educational institutions.

== Mainstream businesses ==
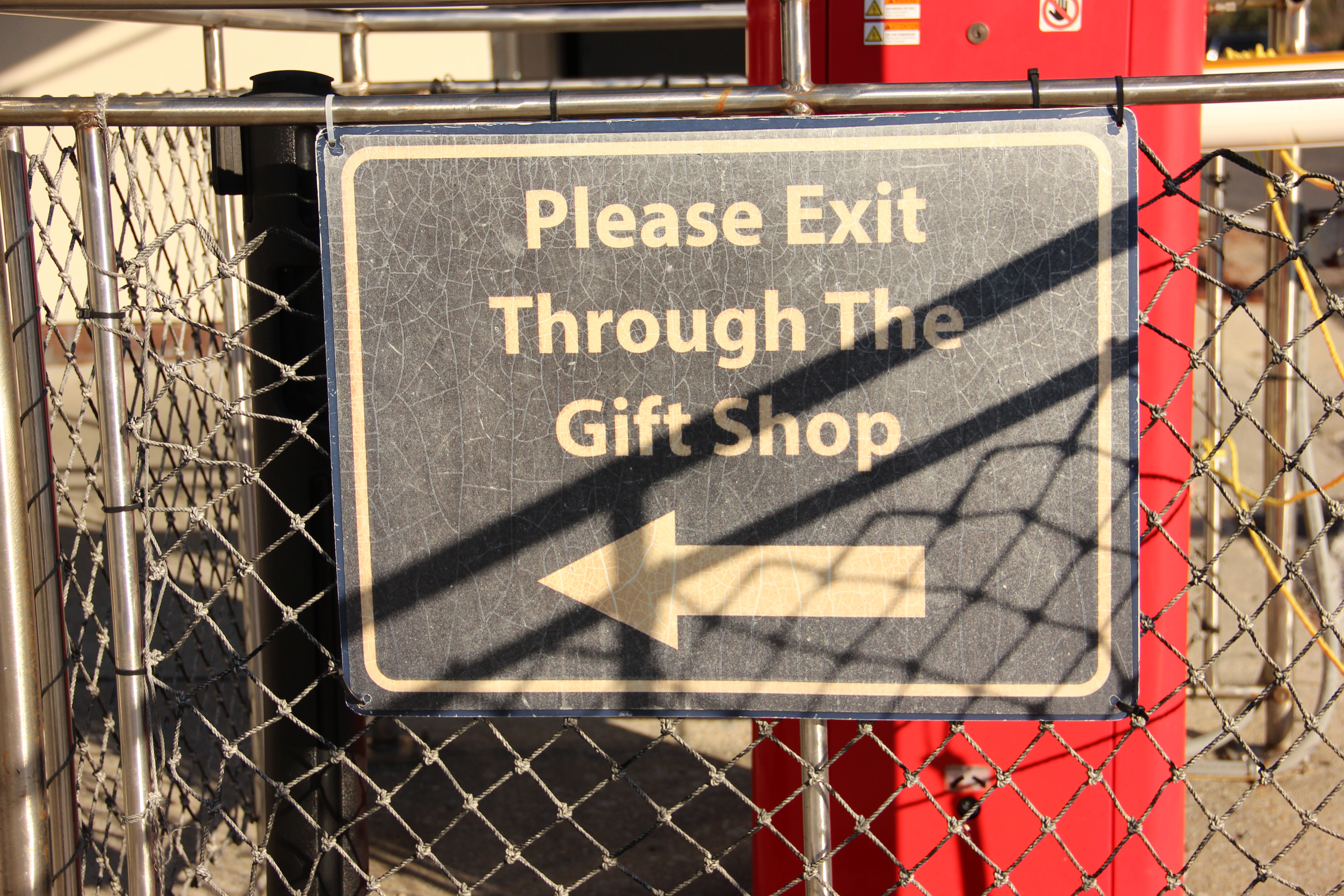
Many theme parks and museums instruct visitors to "exit through the gift shop."

There are many mainstream shopping businesses that target gift-buyers as their primary customer base. These retailers can vary in size, from small independent boutiques to chain stores to large department stores. Each will have different business strategies and will typically sell various product ranges that appeal to different customer groups, with gender, age, celebration or personal interest differentiation.

Many shops that are not primarily gift shops become gift shops during typical gift-giving periods such as Halloween, Christmas, Valentine's Day and Easter offering ranges of gift products for a limited time period in the build-up to these celebrations.

== See also ==
- Tourist trap
- Museum shop
