= Peale Museum =

Museum in Baltimore, Maryland, US

- The Peale
- U.S. National Register of Historic Places
- U.S. National Historic Landmark
- Baltimore City Landmark
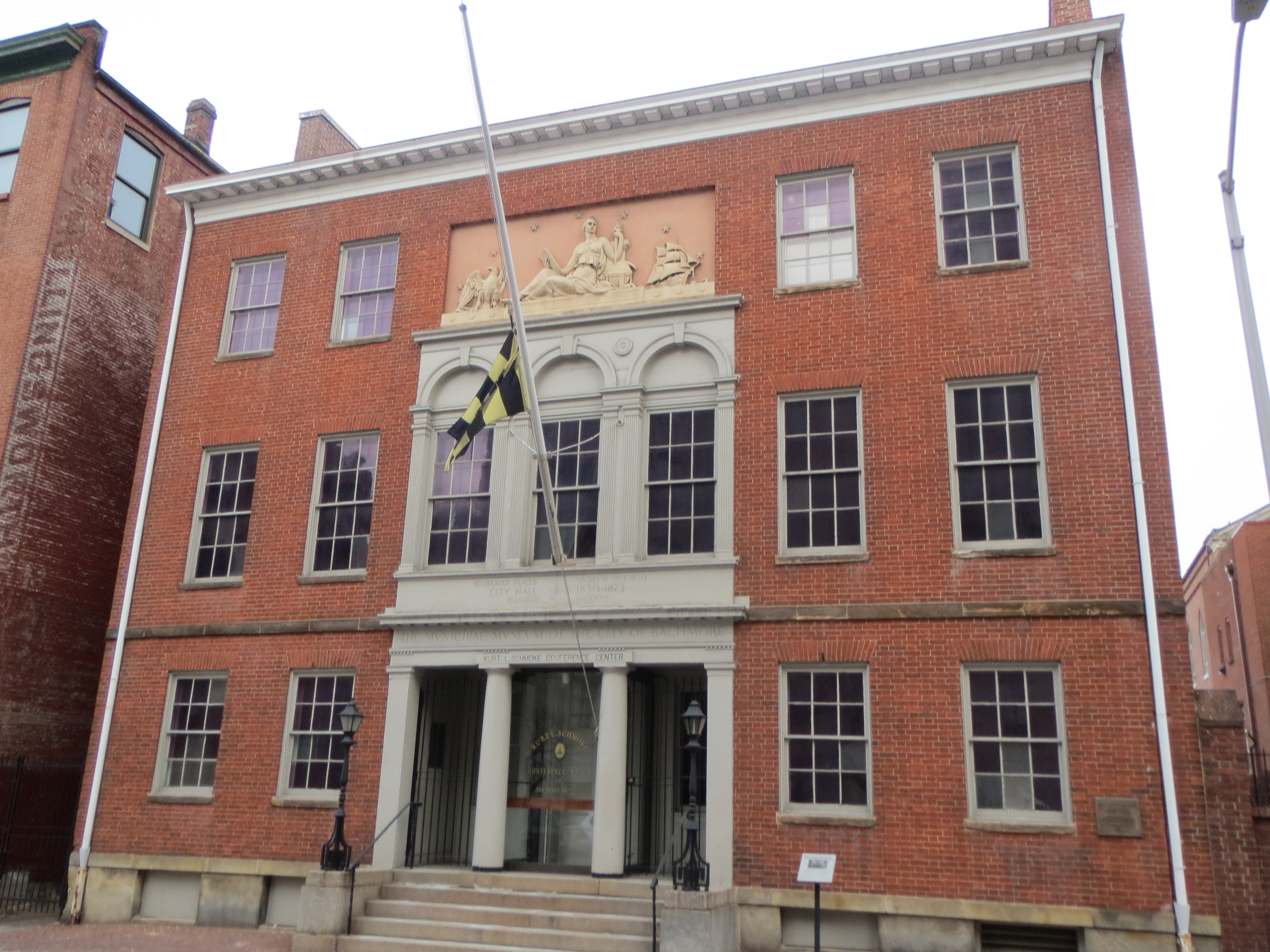
- Museum building in 2013

- Location within Baltimore Location within Maryland Location within the United States
- Location: 225 North Holliday Street, Baltimore, Maryland
- Coordinates: 39°17′30.7″N 76°36′36.4″W
- Built: 1814
- Architects: Robert Carey Long, Sr.
- Architectural style: Georgian
- Website: thepeale.org
- NRHP reference No.: 66000915

Significant dates
- Added to NRHP: October 15, 1966
- Designated NHL: December 21, 1965
- Designated BCL: 1971

The Peale is a community museum in Baltimore, Maryland, which reopened in 2017 after 20 years of vacancy and was fully renovated by 2022. It occupies the first building in the Americas to be designed and built specifically as a museum.

Rembrandt Peale's original museum was open from 1814 until 1829. The collection was moved to a new building as the Baltimore Museum and Gallery of Fine Arts. The original building later served as Baltimore's City Hall from 1830 to 1875 and from 1878 to 1887 as one of the first grammar schools and the first high school for African-American students in Baltimore.

The Building was renovated and rededicated in 1931 as the Municipal Museum of Baltimore. It was renovated again starting in 1978 and was reopened in 1981 as the Peale Museum. The Municipal Museum closed in 1997 and the entire collection was moved to the Maryland Historical Society.

== History ==
=== Peale's Baltimore Museum ===
In 1814, artist Rembrandt Peale established "Peale's Baltimore Museum and Gallery of Fine Arts" at 225 North Holliday Street between East Saratoga and East Lexington streets in Baltimore. Rembrandt was the second son of Charles Willson Peale, the artist and founder of Peale's Philadelphia Museum. The museum occupied the first building in the Western Hemisphere to be designed and built specifically as a museum. It was designed by architect Robert Cary Long, Sr. Rembrandt Peale's museum featured portraits of famous Americans, including some by its founder, as well as the complete skeleton of a prehistoric mastodon exhumed by Charles Willson Peale in 1801. During the Battle of Baltimore a month after opening, Rembrandt Peale, his wife, and seven children spent the night in the museum hoping that the British military would think the museum was their home and spare the building.

The fame of Peale's museum was such that it was occasionally described as simply the "Baltimore Museum." Rembrandt's brother, Rubens Peale, managed the museum until 1829.

Extensive reviews by John Neal of the museum's annual exhibitions in 1822 and 1823 are some of the earliest published works of American art criticism.

The museum was the first building in Baltimore to have gas lighting.

In 1829, the museum building was sold due to financial difficulties and the exhibits were moved to a newly constructed building on the northwest corner of North Calvert Street and East Baltimore Street, one block south of the Battle Monument Square and the Baltimore City Courthouse. This second building became the Baltimore Museum and Gallery of Fine Arts (also known as the Baltimore Museum Theatre) in 1834.

=== Other uses ===
From 1830 to 1875, the museum's former building served as the first Baltimore City Hall.

The building was turned over to the city's Board of School Commissioners and the Baltimore City Public Schools. In 1878, it became the Male and Female Colored School No. 1. The school, which operated until 1887, was one of the first grammar schools and the first high school for African American students in Baltimore. The high school, which opened in 1883, was the predecessor of Frederick Douglass High School.

The building housed the Bureau of Water Supply from 1887 to 1916 and was rented by various shops and factories from 1916 to 1928.

=== Modern museums ===
By 1928, the building had been repeatedly condemned and was in danger of demolition. It was renovated and rededicated in 1931 as the Municipal Museum of Baltimore. The renovation of the building was supervised by John Henry Scarff, a Baltimore-born architect, painter, and archaeologist, who later worked closely on policies governing looted art and damaged monuments during and after World War II.

The building was designated a National Historic Landmark in 1965.

The building underwent a major two-year renovation starting in 1978 and was reopened in 1981 as the Peale Museum. In 1985, the Peale Museum became part of the Baltimore City Life Museums (BCLM), a consortium of historic homes, building and sites.

BCLM folded in 1997 and the entire Peale Museum collection was moved to the Maryland Historical Society, now called the Maryland Center for History and Culture, leaving the original building on North Holliday Street vacant until it was reopened for periodic public programs and events in 2017.

In 2014, a campaign was being waged by a Maryland group to raise $4 million for restoration of the museum. The restoration project was completed in 2022 and "the Peale", "Baltimore’s Community Museum" and had its grand reopening celebrations on the occasion of the building's 208th anniversary in August 2022.
