= Peale's Philadelphia Museum =

Former museum in Philadelphia

Philadelphia Museum
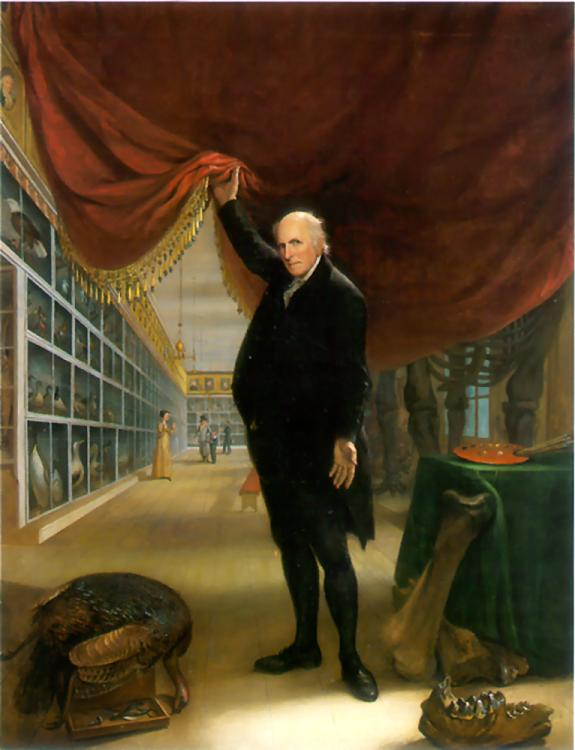
- The Artist in His Museum (1822)
- Established: 1784
- Dissolved: 1849
- Location: Independence Hall, Philadelphia, Pennsylvania (1802–1827)
- Key holdings: Peale's mastodon
- Founder: Charles Willson Peale

The Philadelphia Museum was an early museum in Philadelphia started by the painter Charles Willson Peale and continued by his family. It opened in 1784 as an art museum and added a natural history collection in 1786. The exhibits included the first nearly complete skeleton of the mastodon, a relative of the mammoth. Peale died in 1827 and the collection was sold in 1849 and 1854.

== History ==
=== Early years ===
Peale opened the Philadelphia Museum in his home at Third and Lombard Streets in 1784. The first exhibition was a collection of forty-four portraits of "worthy personages" from the American Revolutionary War. Two years later, in 1786, he advertised his museum as a repository for natural curiosities. In addition to portraits, the museum's collection eventually included natural history specimens, fossils, archaeological finds, Native American and Asian objects and curiosities. Peale preserved his animal specimens using the methods of Edme-Louis Daubenton; however, the results were not satisfactory. He therefore tried other methods and found that arsenic or mercuric chloride were more effective. In 1794 Peale accepted the post of librarian at the American Philosophical Society and moved his home and museum to their building at Fifth and Chestnut Streets.

=== The Peale Mastodon ===
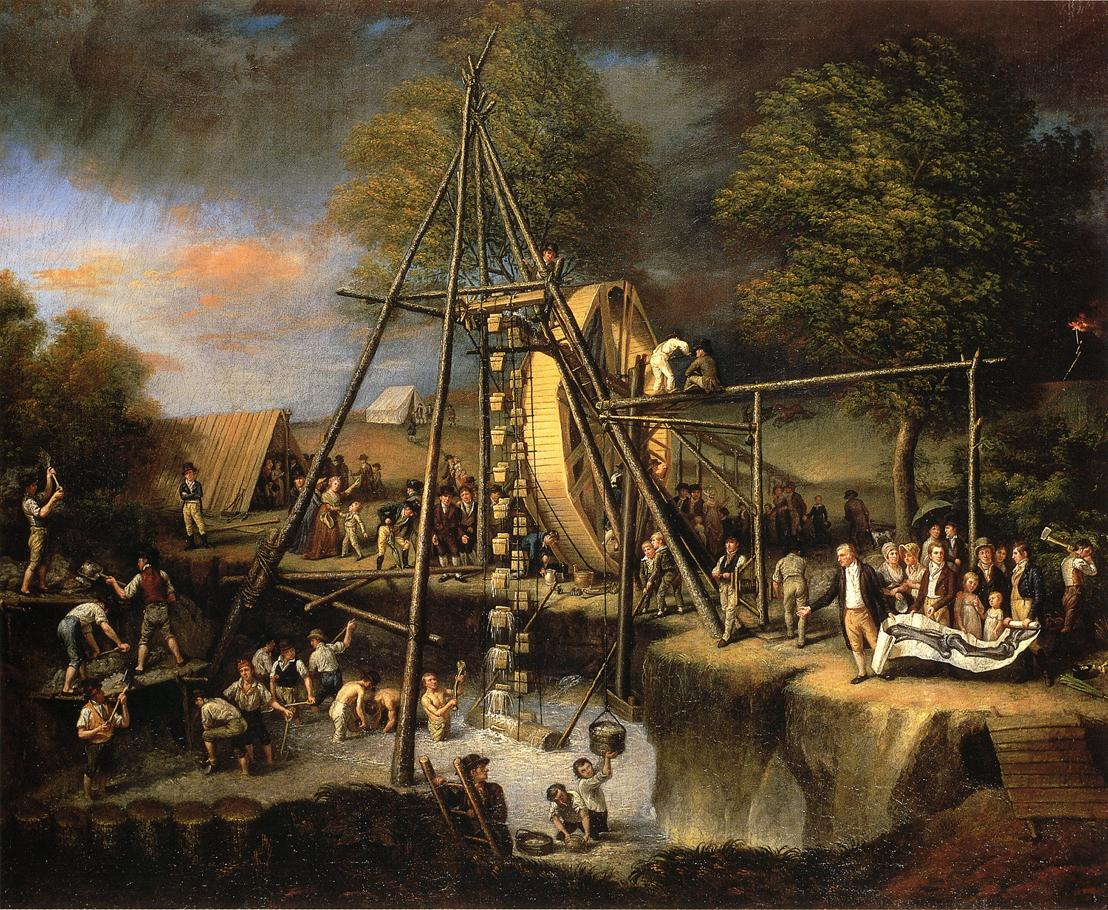
The Exhumation of the Mastodon, 1806, by Charles Willson Peale

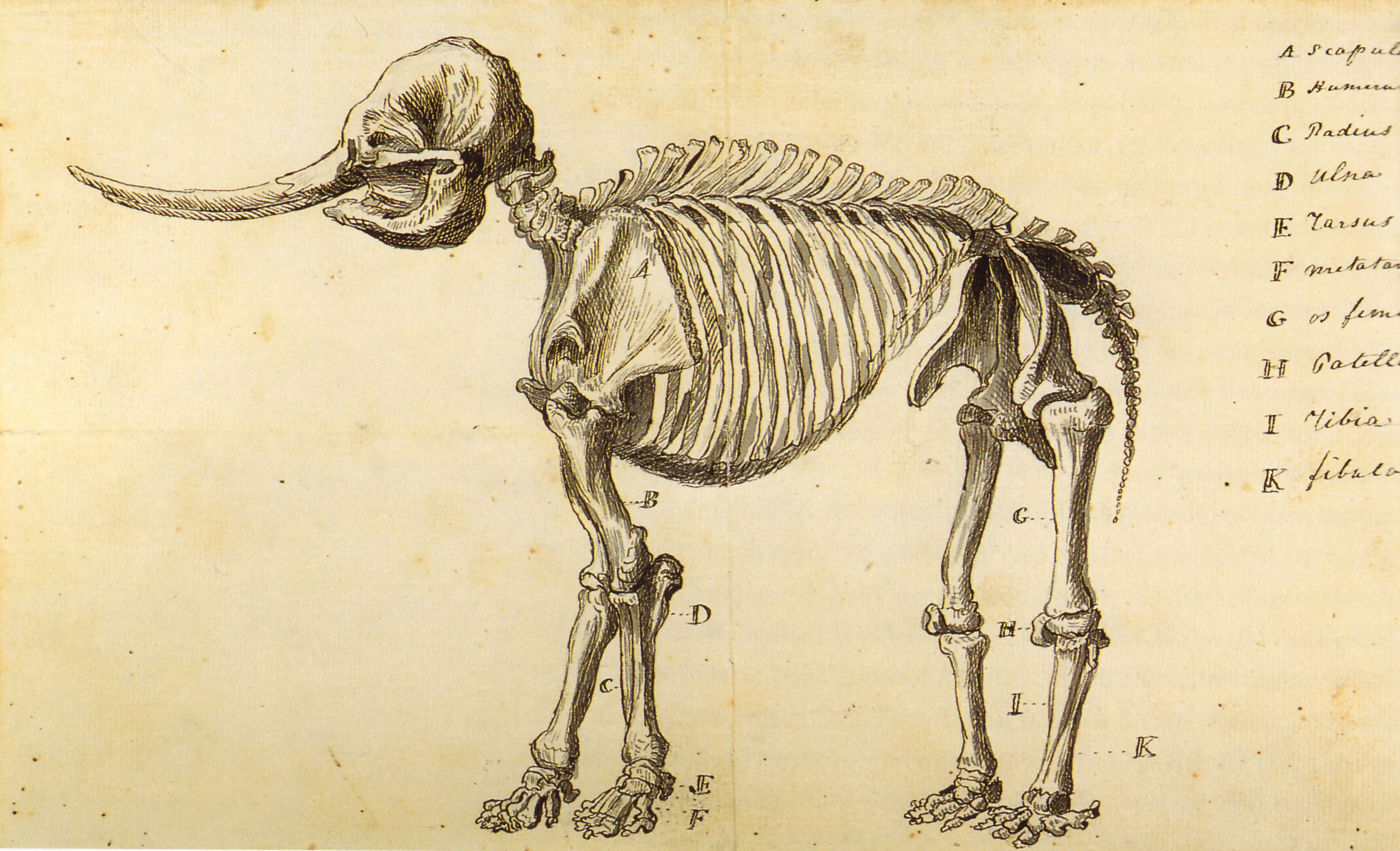
Sketch of the mastodon skeleton, 1801, by Rembrandt Peale

In 1801 Peale visited a farm in New York State to view some recently discovered bones of a mastodon, an extinct relative of the European mammoth which was then known as the Great Incognitum. He agreed to pay the farmer $200 for the bones already discovered and $100 for permission to find the remaining bones. The excavation involved draining a 12-foot pit and took six weeks, but eventually the first nearly complete skeleton of the species was recovered. As the skeleton was incomplete, Peale's son Rembrandt carved wooden replicas with the help of the sculptor William Rush and Moses Williams, a formerly enslaved person. This was only the second time that a fossil skeleton had been mounted, the previous example being a megatherium assembled in Madrid. The skeleton was unveiled in December as a separate exhibit costing 50¢, in addition to 25¢ to visit the museum. Peale commemorated the excavation with his painting of 1806–1808, The Exhumation of the Mastodon. The skeleton was purchased by the naturalist Johann Jakob Kaup in 1854 and is now in the Hessisches Landesmuseum Darmstadt in Germany. Peale also reconstructed a second skeleton, which was later displayed in the Peale Museum in Baltimore, then purchased by John Collins Warren and eventually acquired by the American Museum of Natural History in New York.

=== Independence Hall ===
In 1802 the museum moved again to Independence Hall, the former Pennsylvania statehouse. Peale retired in 1810 and left the running of the museum to his son Rubens. The museum was incorporated as the Philadelphia Museum Company in 1821. In 1822 Peale painted The Artist in His Museum, a self-portrait with his museum in the Long Room of the Independence Hall in the background.

=== Other museums ===
In 1814 Peale's son Rembrandt opened a second Peale Museum in Baltimore, which was the first purpose-built museum building in the United States. Rubens opened a third museum in New York in 1825. In the 1840s the Peale museums suffered from declining revenue and competition from the showman P. T. Barnum, who opened his American Museum in New York in 1842. The New York Peale museum was closed in 1842 and the Baltimore museum in 1845, their contents being sold to Barnum.

=== Later years ===
Peale died in 1827 and the museum moved again to Chestnut Street Arcade. Later, Peale's son Titian took over. In 1838 the museum moved to a newly constructed building at Ninth and Sansom streets, which was also known as the Chinese Museum as it initially housed the Chinese collection of Nathan Dunn, one of its directors, in its lower story. That building burned down in 1854. In 1840, the museum acquired the Mechanical Turk, a chess playing "automaton" operated by a hidden human.

Due to financial problems, the museum sold its 1838 building in 1843 and had to pay a high rent for the building until it moved out. Charles Willson's grandson, Edmund Peale, bought the collection at auction in 1845 and moved it into an ex-Masonic hall in Chestnut Street. The majority of the Philadelphia collection was sold to P. T. Barnum and Moses Kimball in 1849 and was subsequently lost or destroyed. The portrait collection was auctioned in 1854 and some of it was bought by the City of Philadelphia for display in Independence Hall.

== Gallery ==
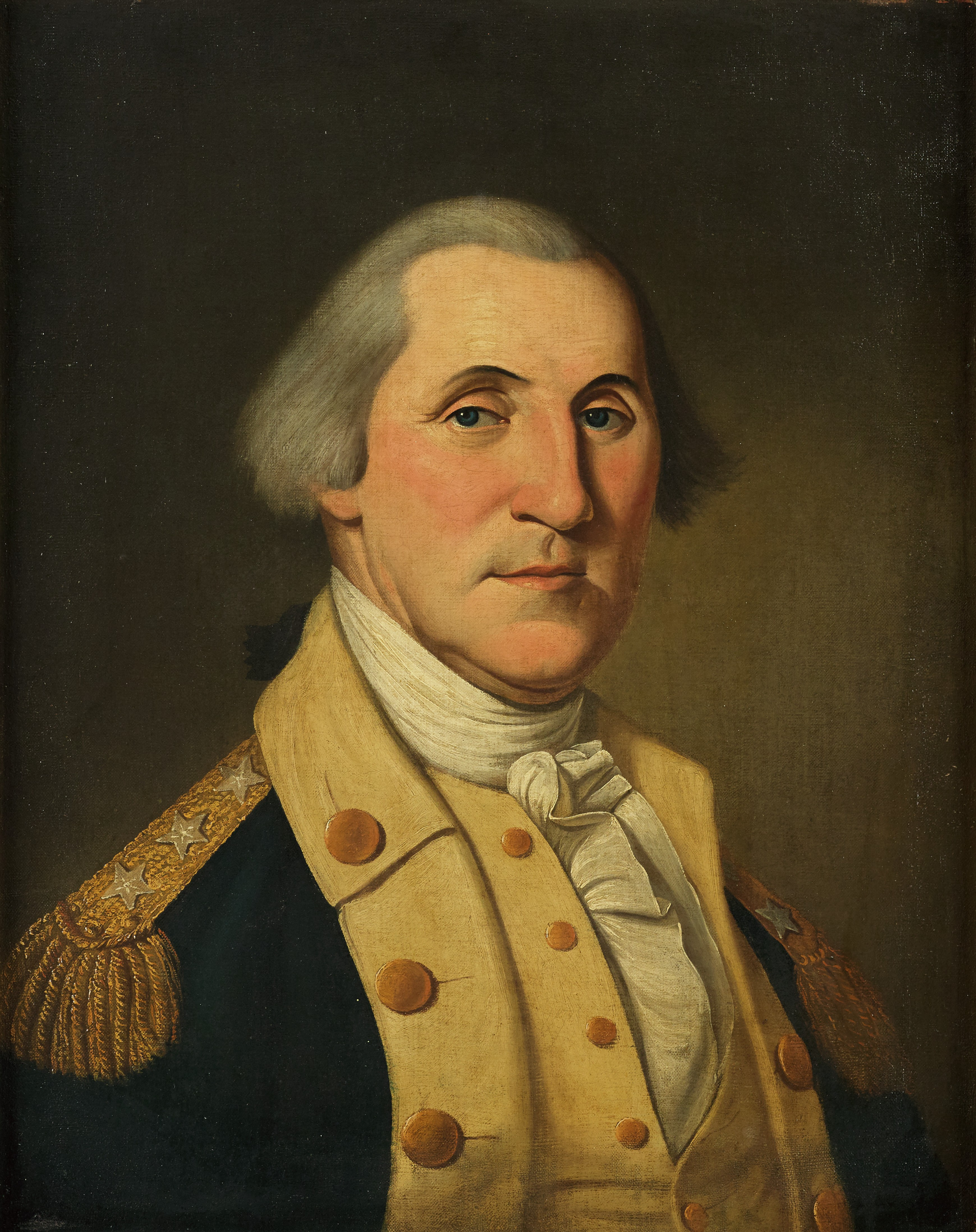
George Washington

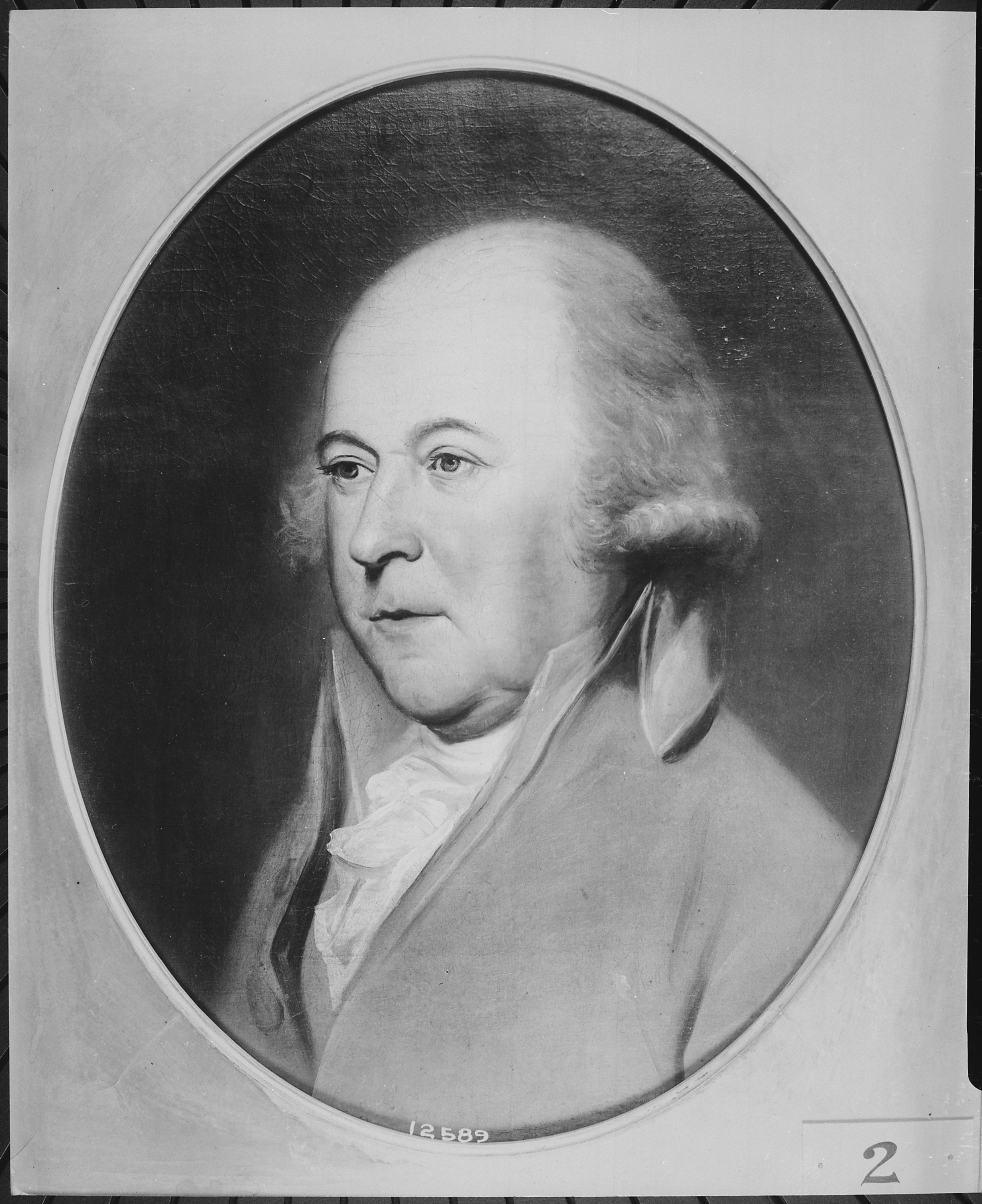
John Adams

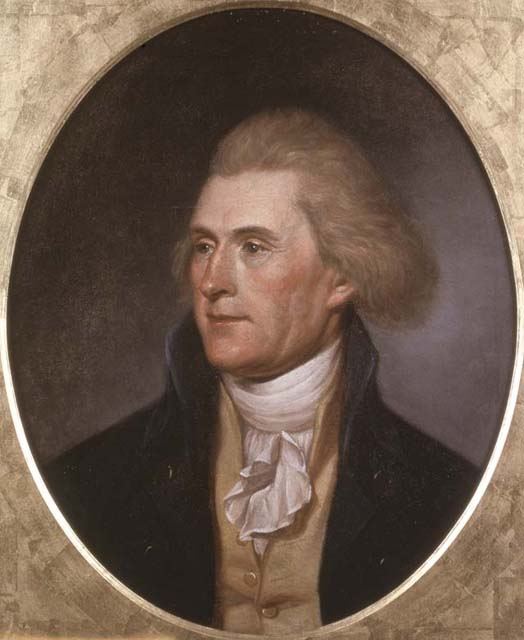
Thomas Jefferson

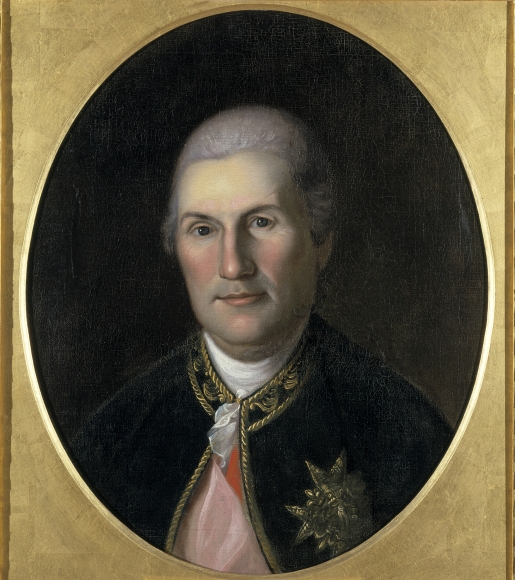
Comte de Rochambeau

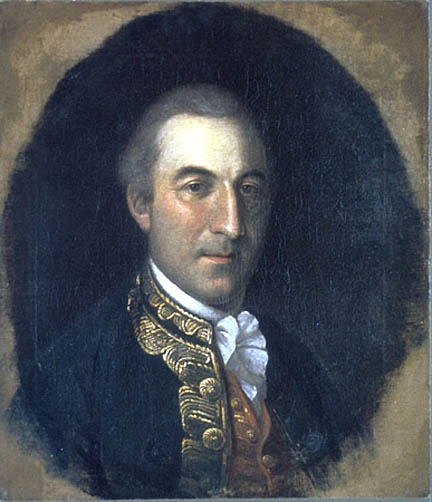
François Jean de Chastellux

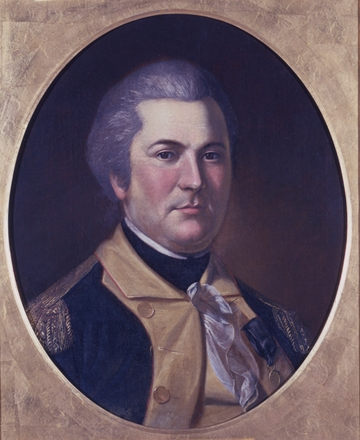
Louis Antoine Jean Baptiste Chevalier De Cambray Digny

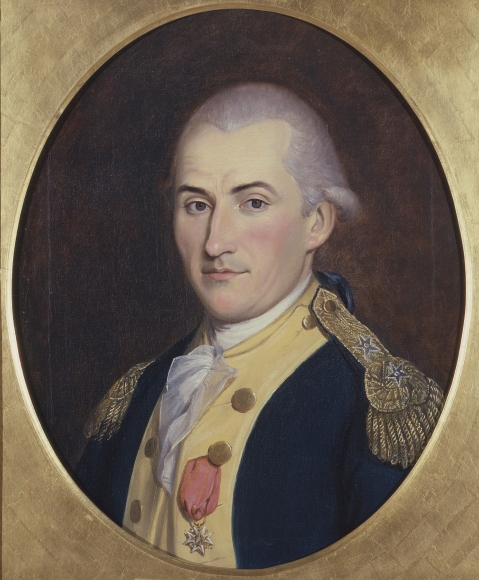
Louis Le Bègue de Presle Duportail

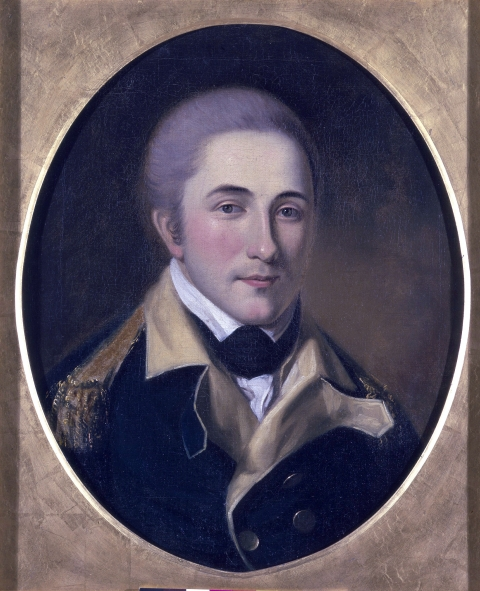
Chevalier de Ternant

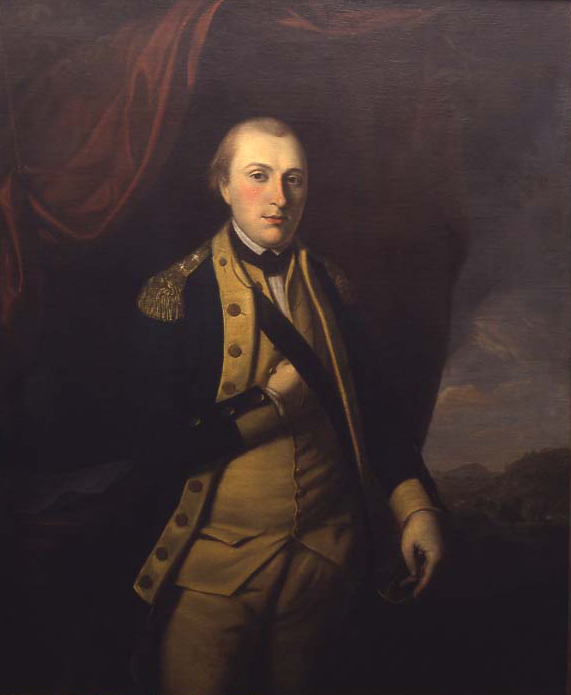
Marquis de Lafayette

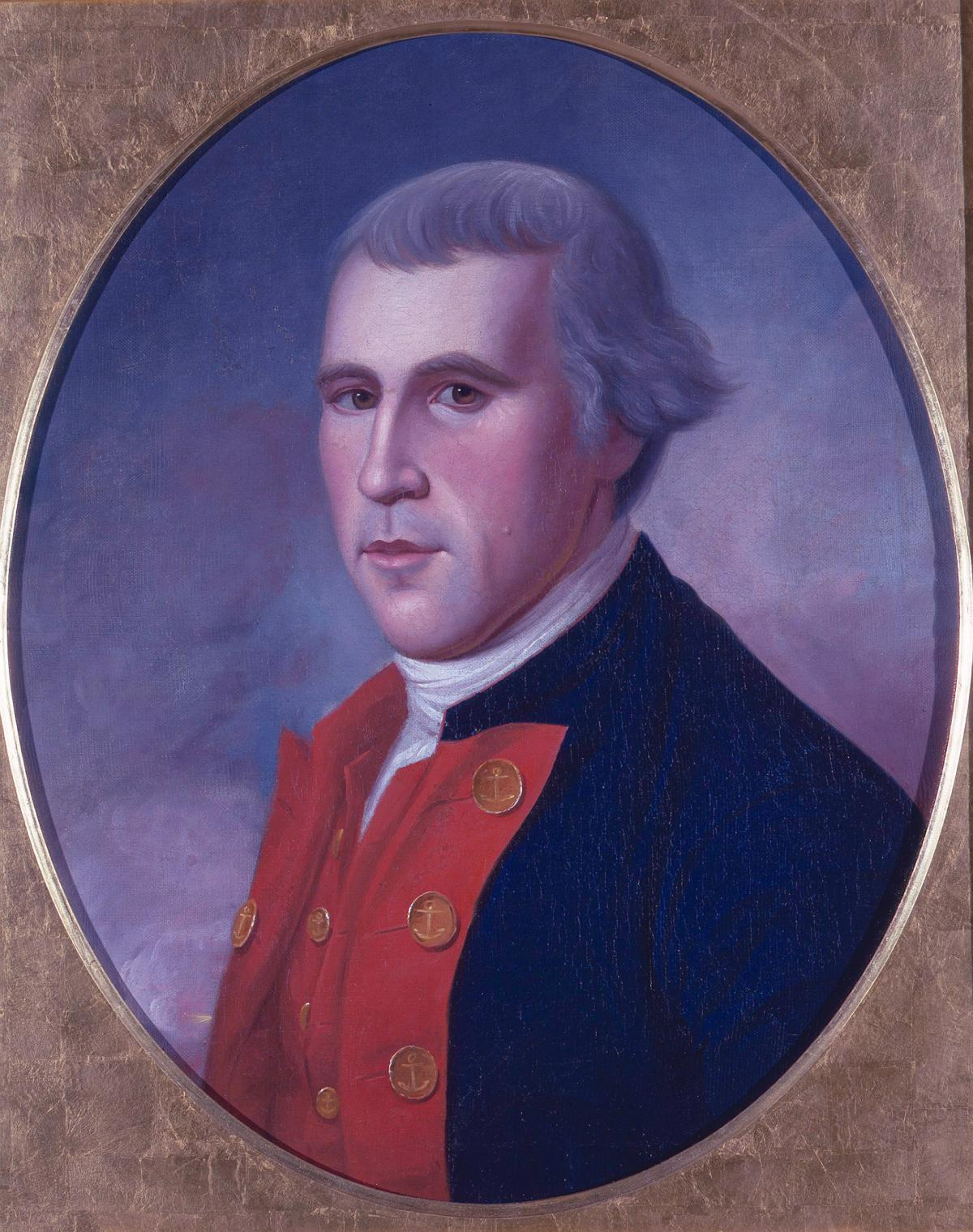
Nicholas Biddle

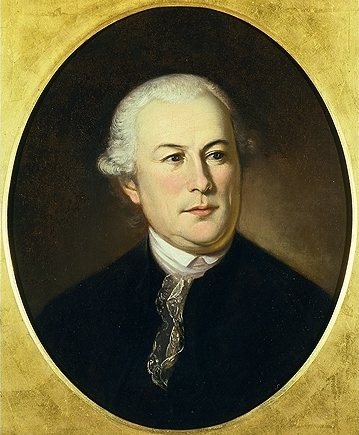
Elias Boudinot

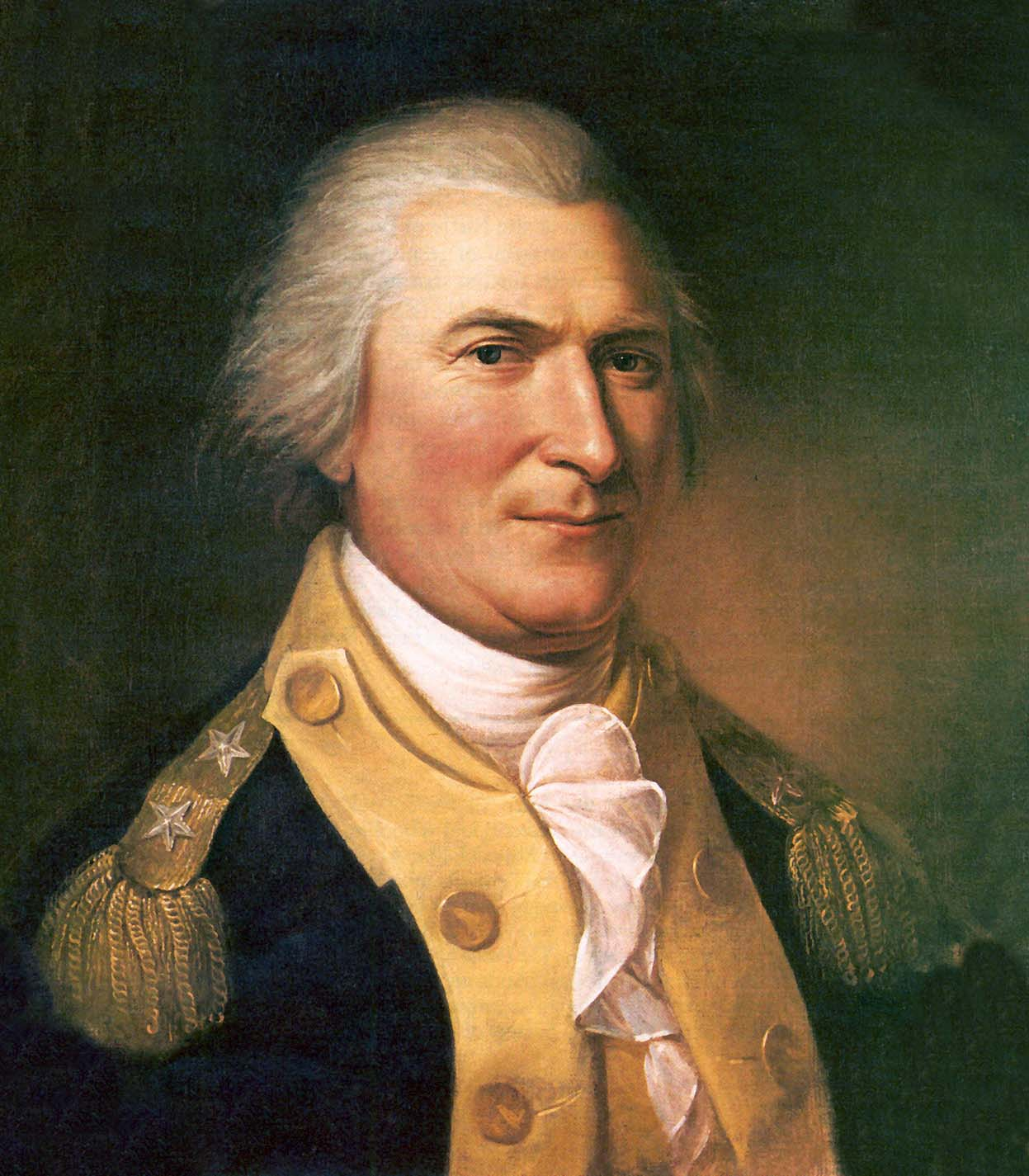
Arthur St Clair

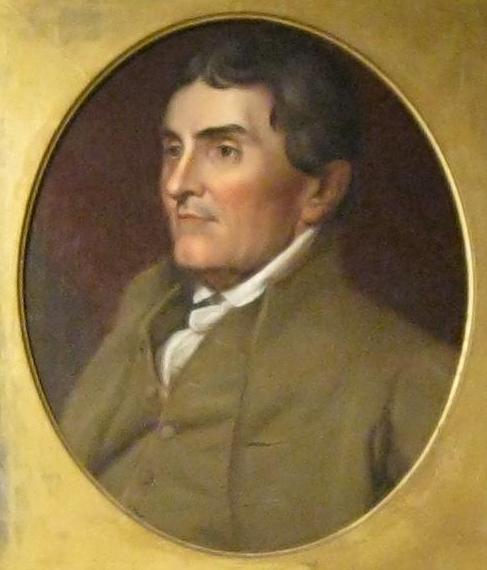
Thomas Forrest

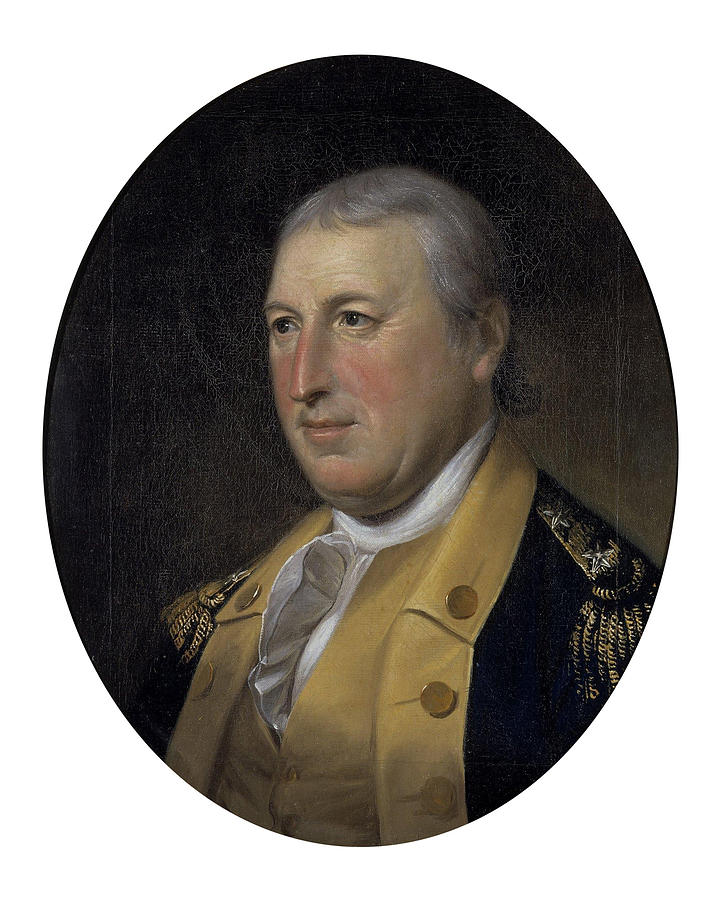
Horatio Gates

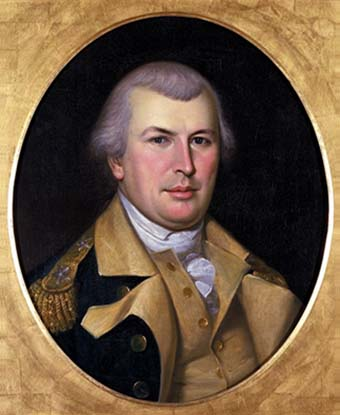
Nathanael Greene

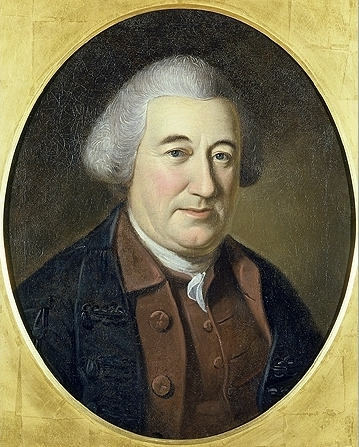
John Hanson

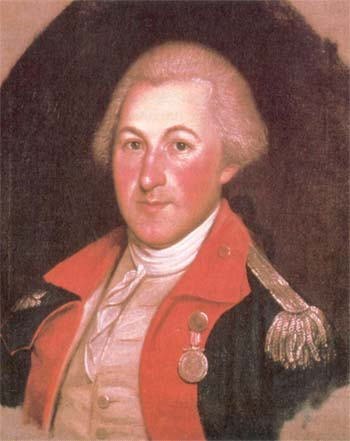
John Eager Howard

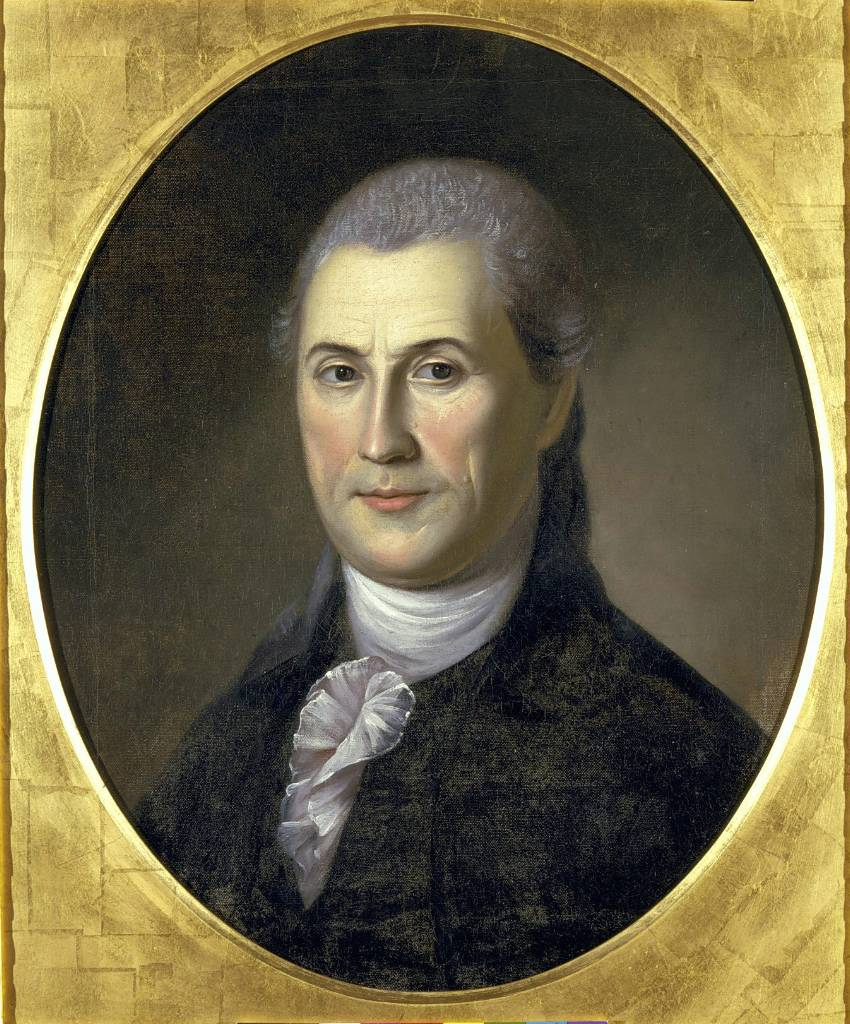
Samuel Huntington

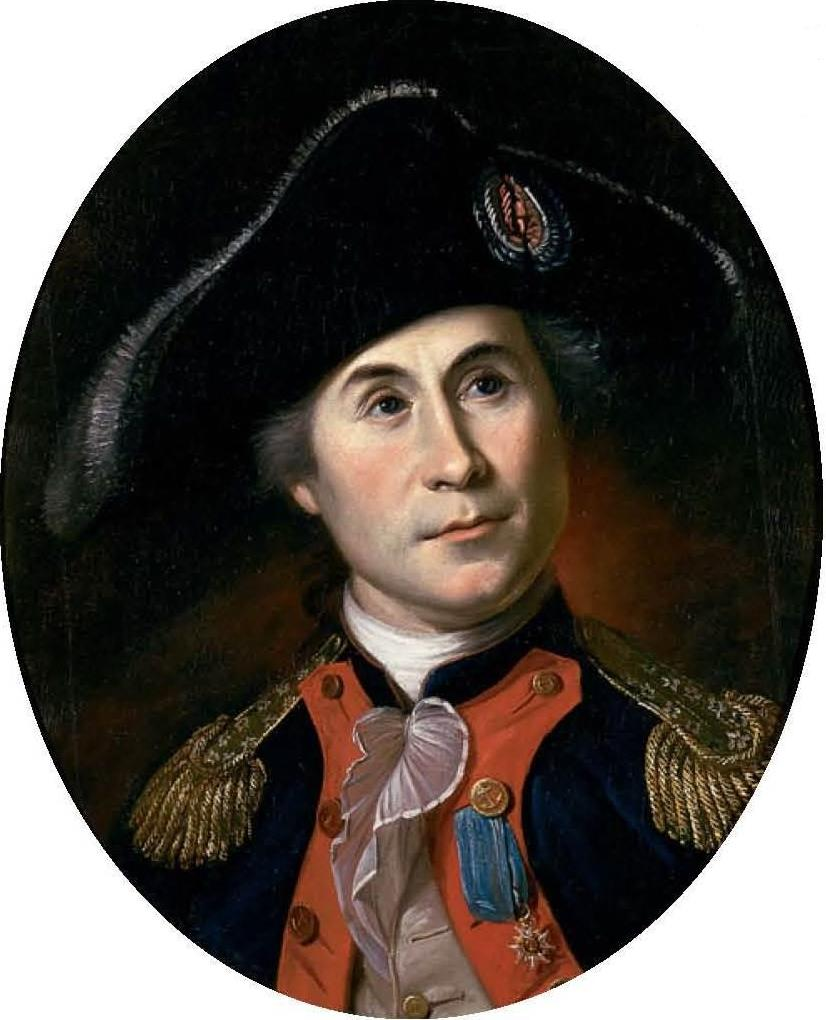
John Paul Jones

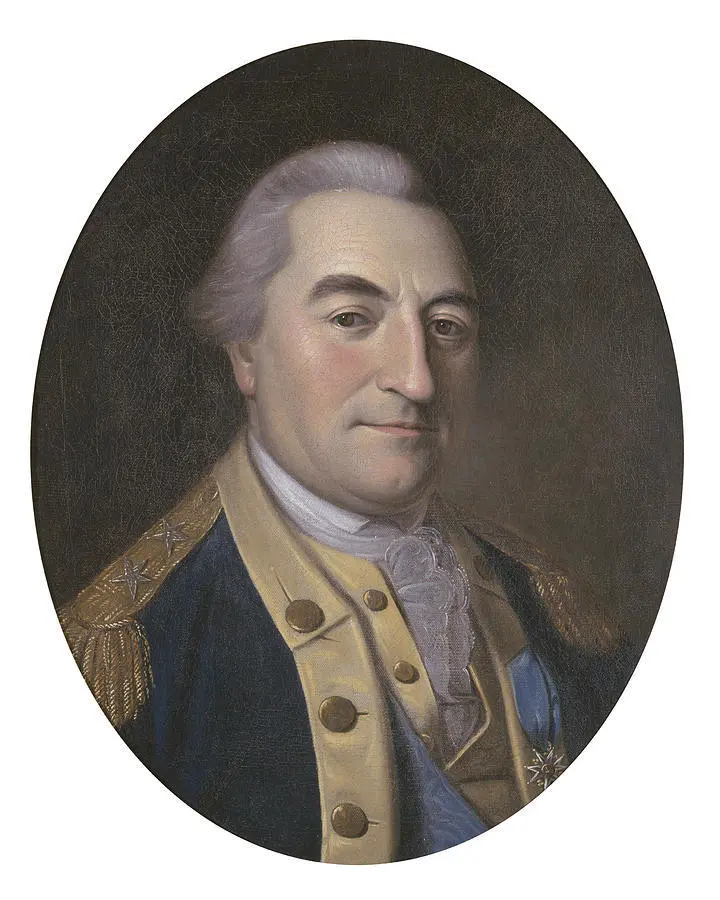
Johann de Kalb

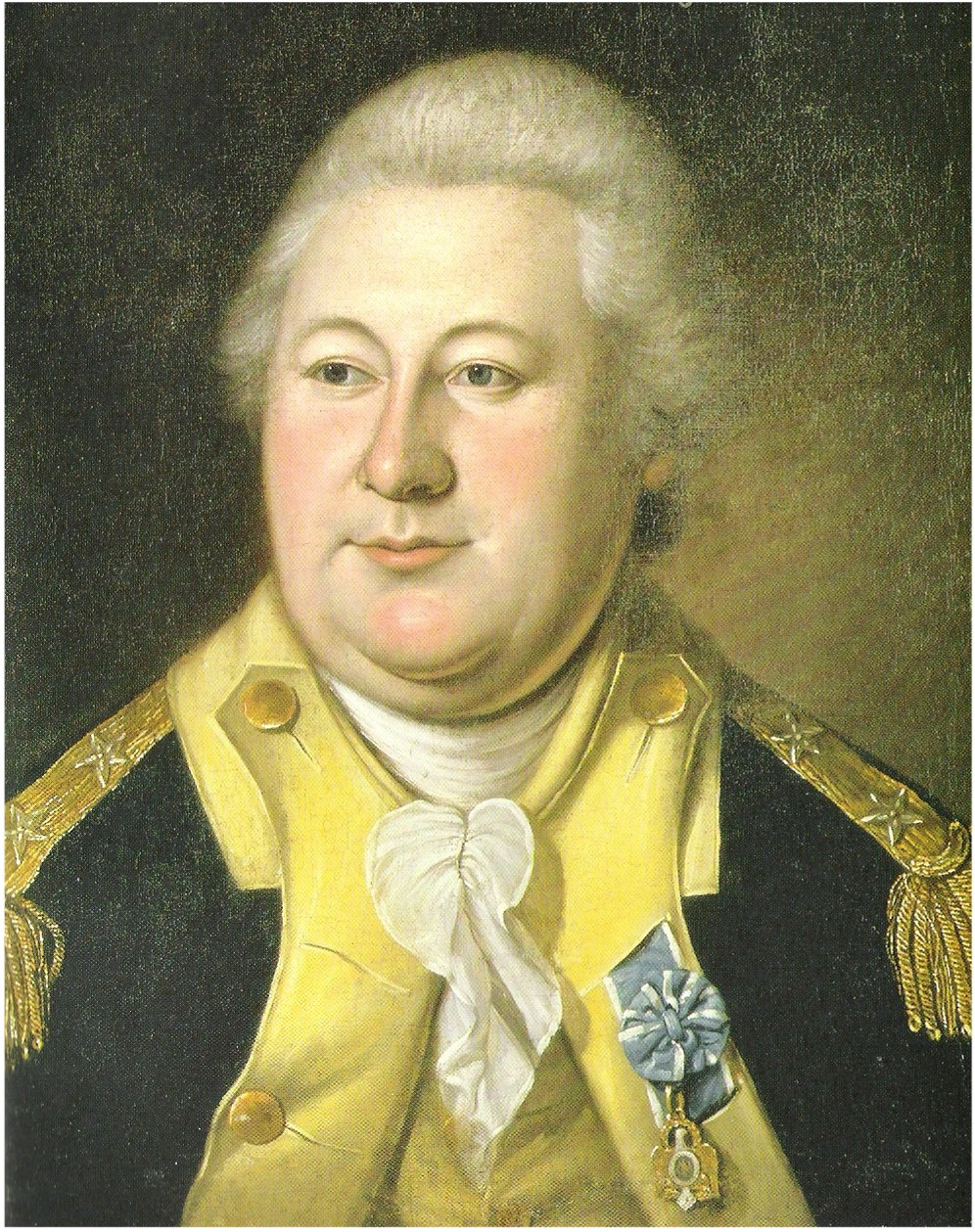
Henry Knox

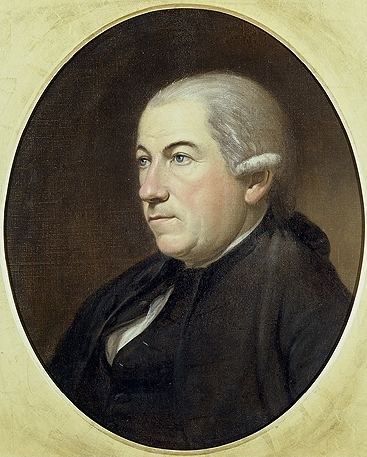
Henry Laurens

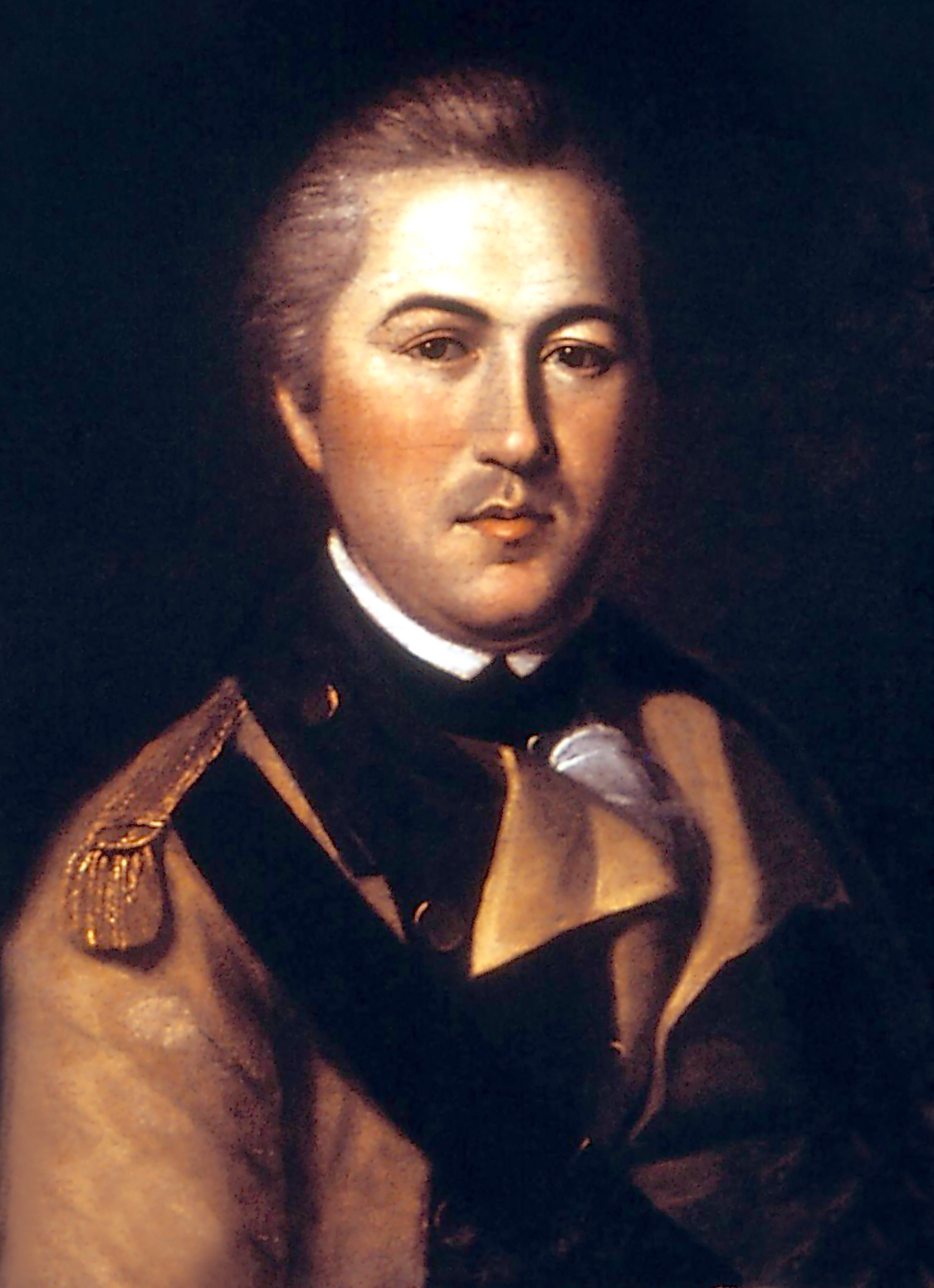
Henry Lee

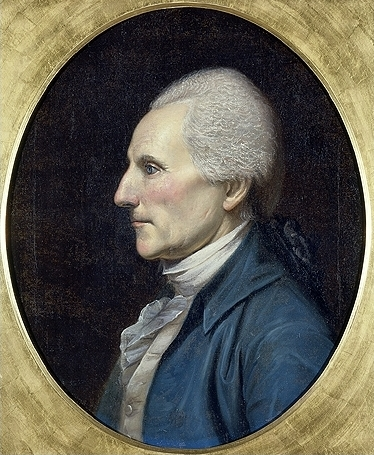
Richard Henry Lee

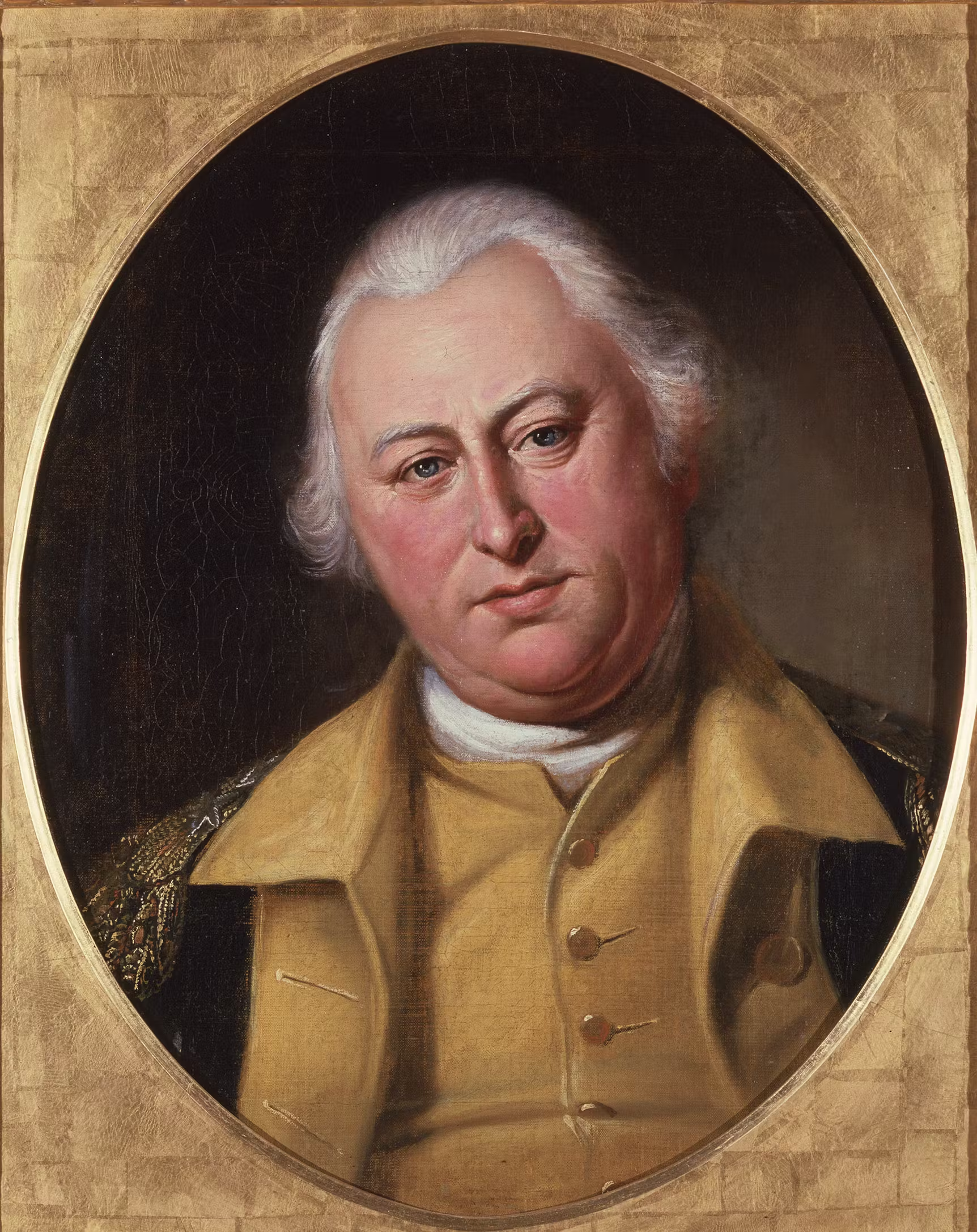
Benjamin Lincoln

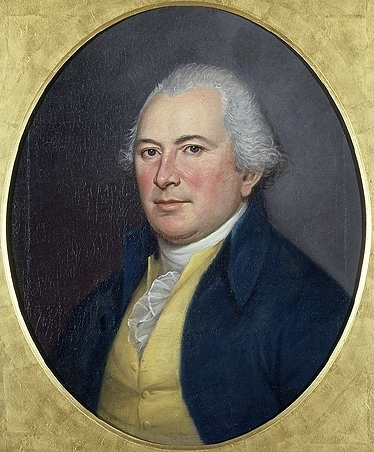
Thomas Mifflin

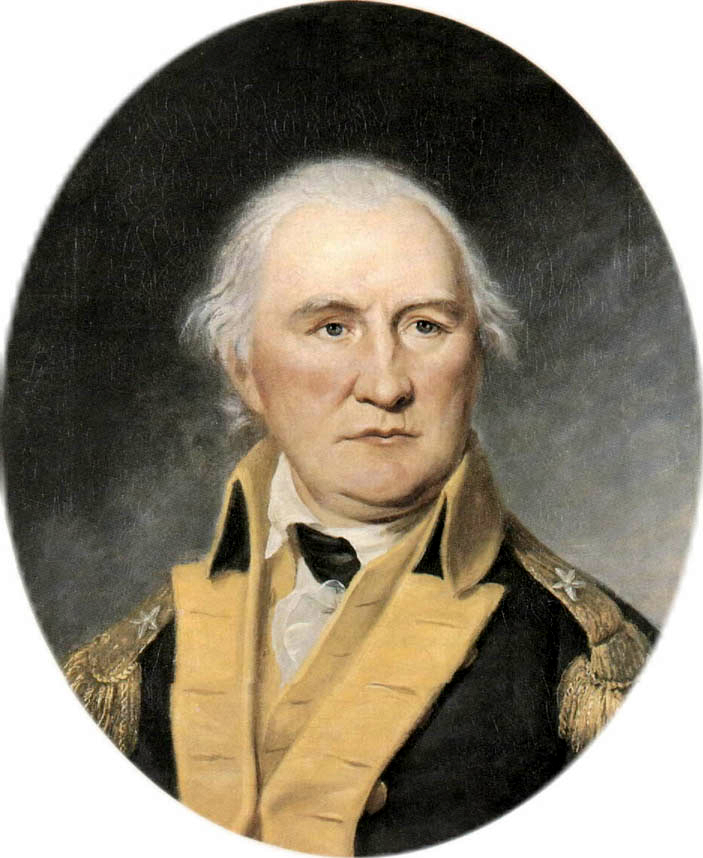
Daniel Morgan

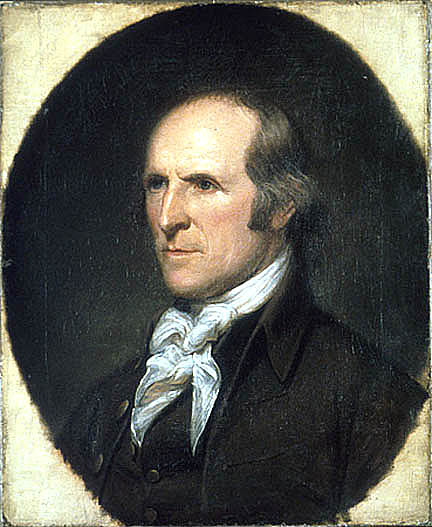
Timothy Pickering

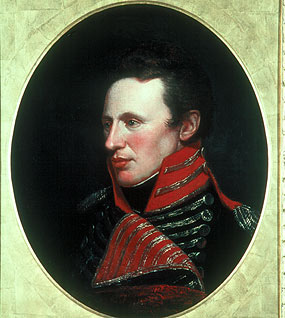
Zebulon Pike

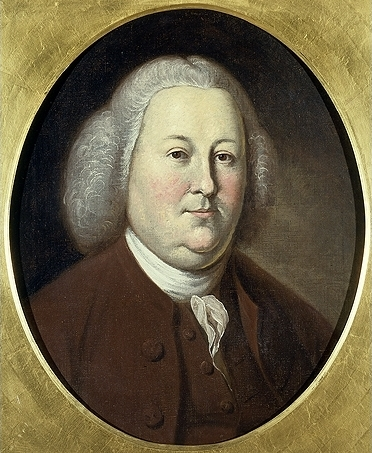
Peyton Randolph

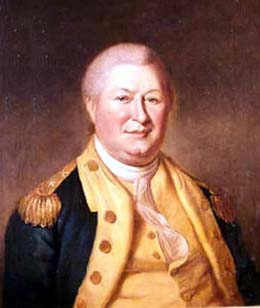
William Smallwood

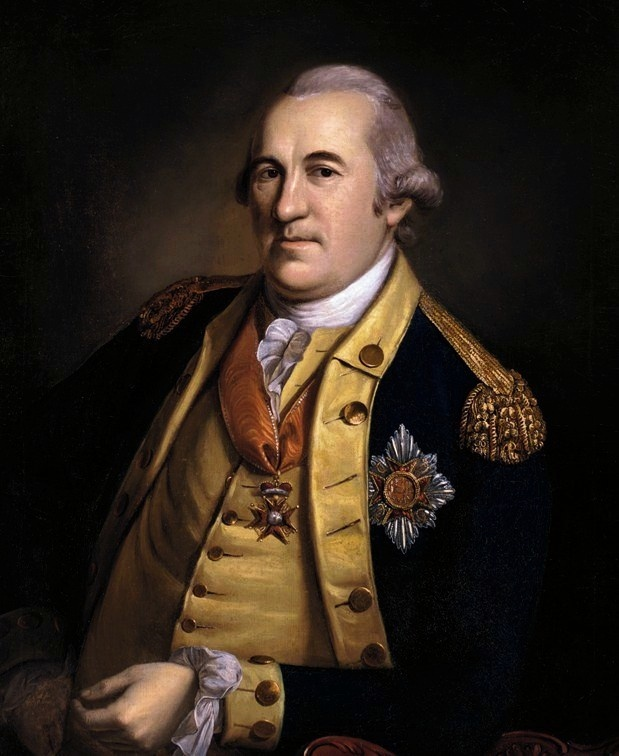
Baron Steuben

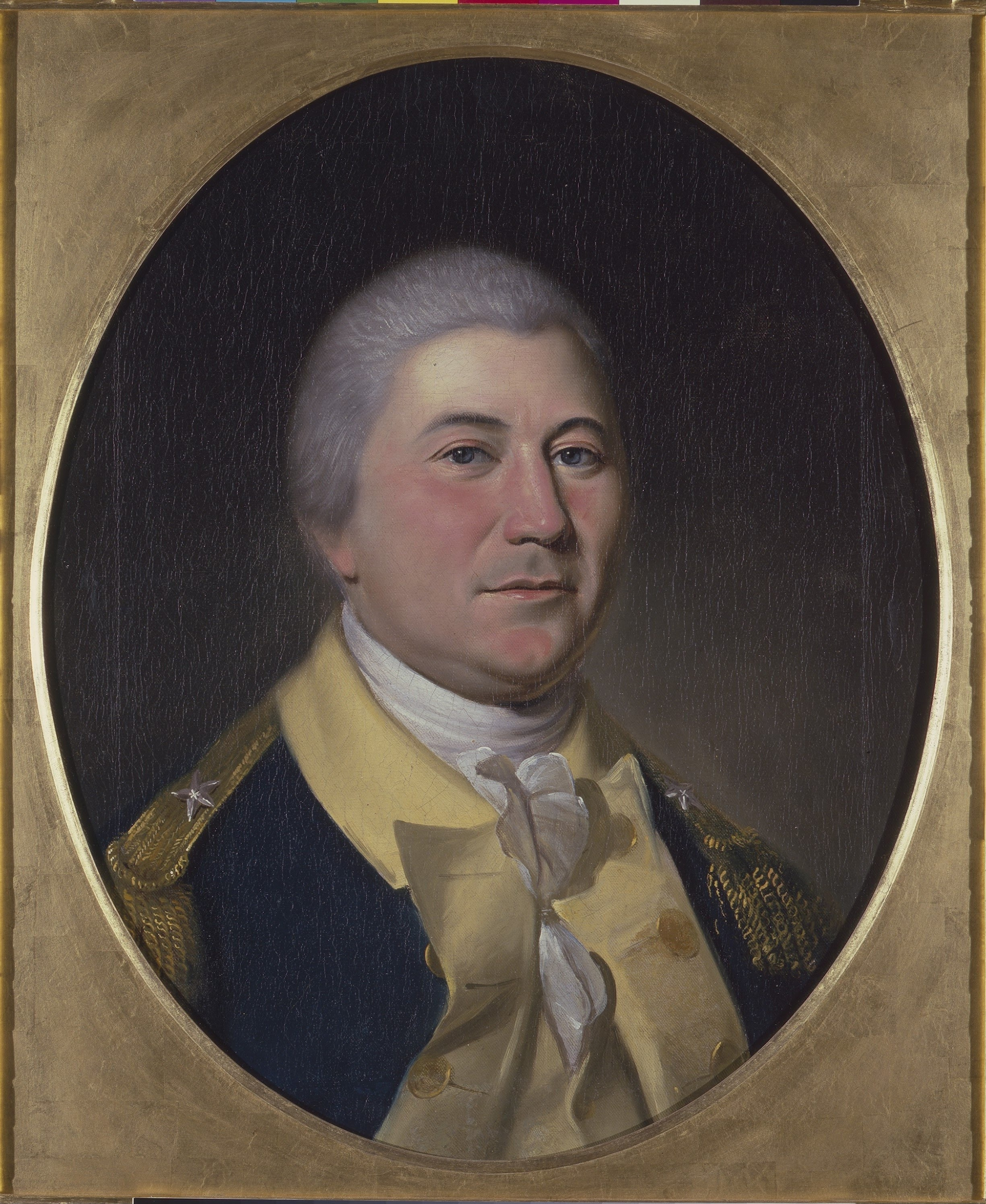
James Mitchell Varnum

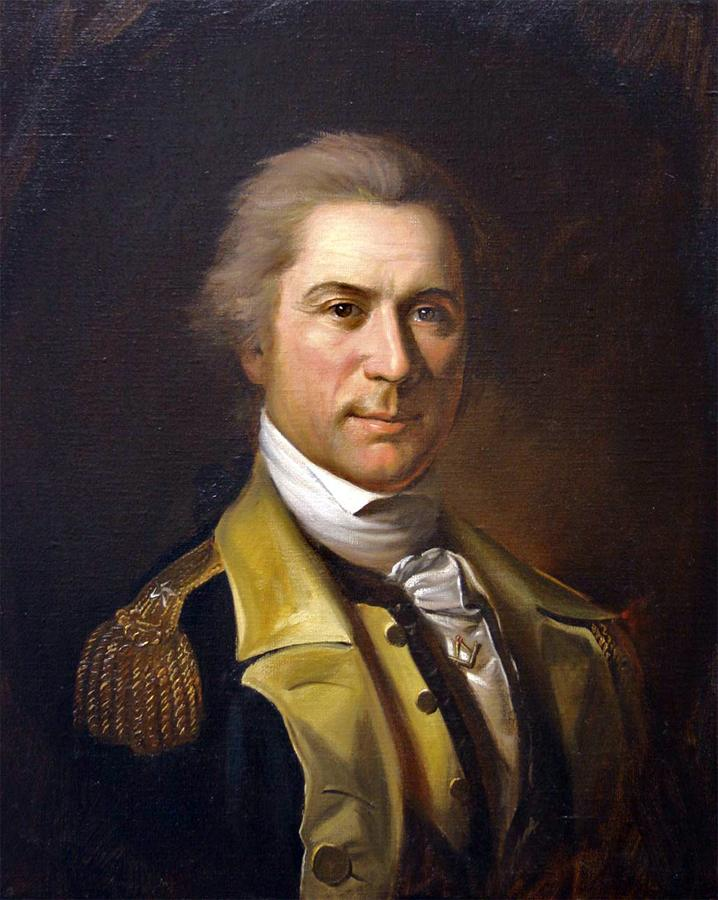
Otho Holland Williams

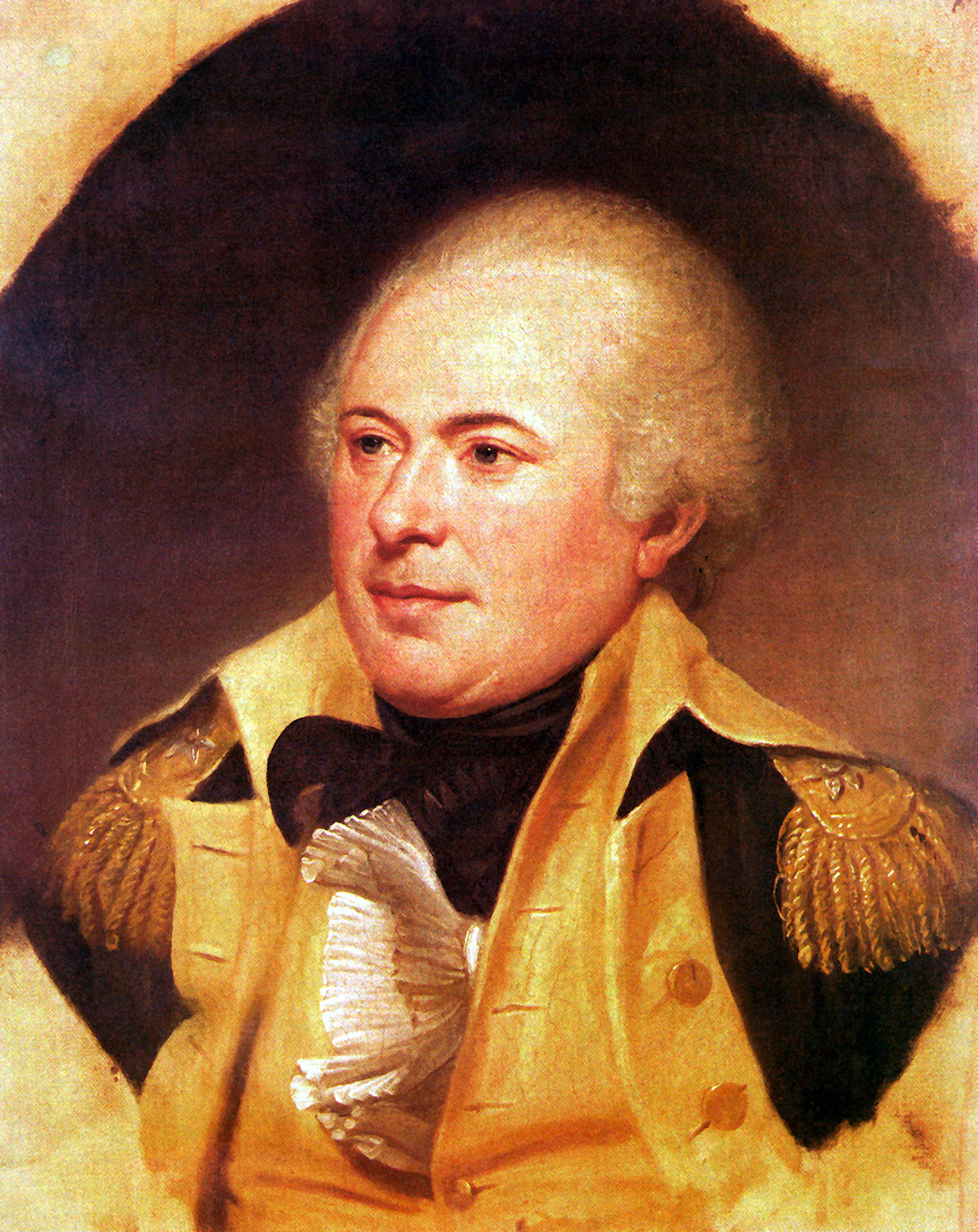
James Wilkinson
