= Moses Williams (artist) =

African-American visual artist

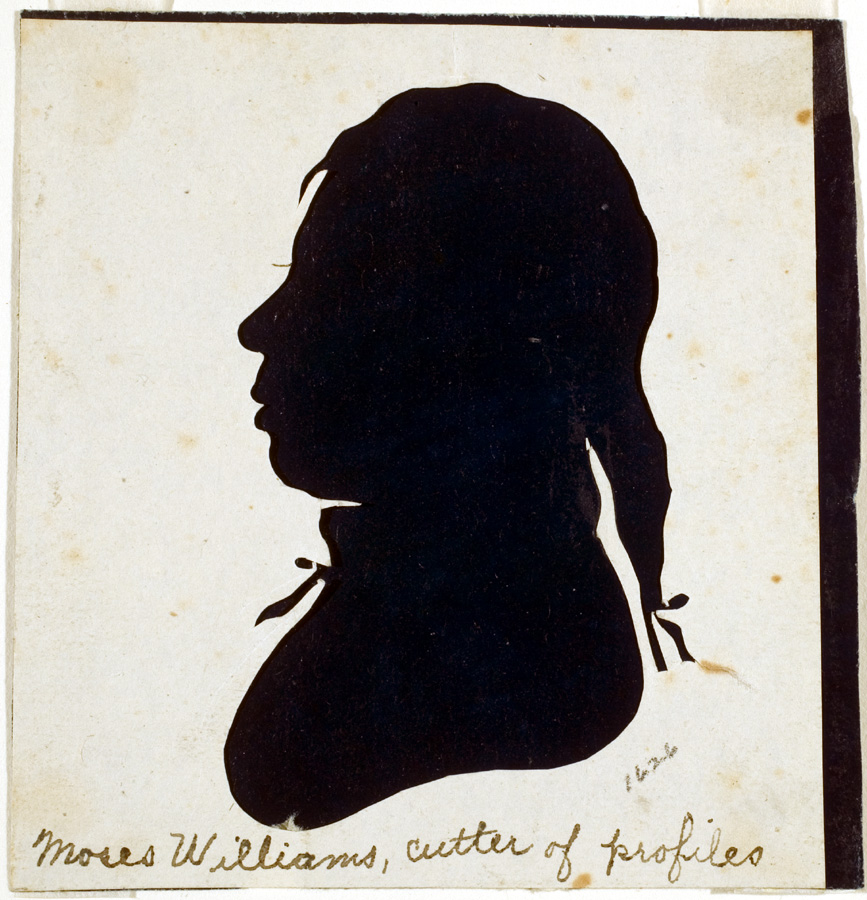
- Silhouette of Moses Williams
- Born: Philadelphia, Pennsylvania, US
- Known for: Silhouette making
- Patrons: Charles Willson Peale

Moses Williams (c. 1777 – c. 1830) was a formerly enslaved African American visual artist who made tens of thousands of silhouettes for visitors to Peale's Philadelphia Museum. He was associated with Philadelphia-based artist Charles Willson Peale.

== Early life, slavery, and education ==
Moses Williams was born into slavery circa 1777 in Philadelphia, Pennsylvania, to enslaved parents Scarborough and Lucy Peale. While living in Annapolis, Maryland, sometime between 1769 and 1775, renowned artist Charles Willson Peale had acquired Williams's parents. In 1786, Peale manumitted Williams's parents in accordance with Pennsylvania state law, and Williams's father, Scarborough, changed his name to John Williams. Years later, upon gaining his freedom, Williams took his father's surname.

Although Williams's parents had been freed, the law mandated that the nine-year-old Moses remain in Peale's service until his twenty-eighth birthday. Consequently, Williams grew up in the Peale household alongside Peale's many artistic children, including Rembrandt Peale, Raphaelle Peale, Franklin Peale, and Titian Ramsay Peale.

The Philadelphia Daily News at one point described Williams as a "light mulatto man" who was "pleasant" and "witty." Similarly, Peale himself referred to his slave in a 1799 diary entry as “my Molatto [sic] Man Moses,” indicating that Williams was multiracial. With his long, straight hair tied back in a queue, as depicted in his 1803 silhouette, he may have sought to anglicize his features.

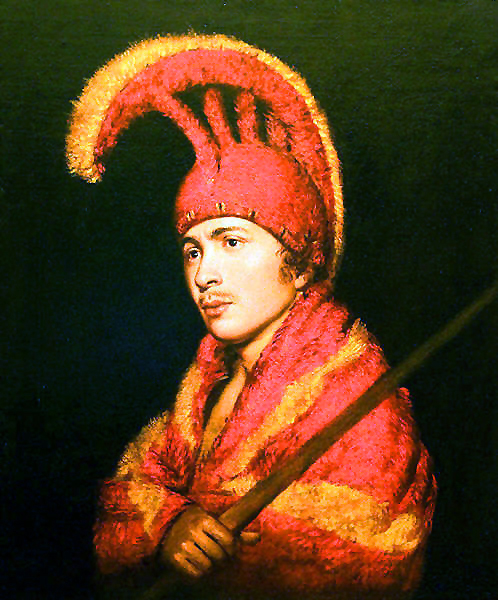
"Man Wearing Feather Cloak and Helmet" by Rembrandt Peale, with Moses Williams as the model

== Silhouette maker ==
Growing up in the Peale household, Williams received training in areas such as taxidermy, object display, and silhouette-making in order to work at Peale's Philadelphia Museum. With Rembrandt Peale and sculptor William Rush, Williams probably worked on the museum's famous mastodon exhibit. As a slave, he was not taught the "higher art" of painting.

After showing skill at silhouette-making, Williams was supplied with a physiognotrace machine to make silhouettes. He continued to work at Peale's museum as a freedman and professional silhouette artist, making black-and-white paper silhouettes for museum visitors. He produced more than 8,000 silhouettes during his first year working at Peale's museum. He earned 6 to 8 cents for every silhouette he cut. He also created silhouettes of the Peale family, including Charles Willson Peale and his wife, Elizabeth. Williams' silhouettes were stamped simply "Museum," so his legacy received scant scholarly attention until the 1990s.

With the money he earned making silhouettes, Williams purchased his freedom one year in advance of his 28th birthday and purchased a two-story brick house on 10 Sterling Alley in Philadelphia, becoming one of the few African Americans to own property in Philadelphia. He also married Maria (surname unknown), a white woman who had worked as Peale's cook. He had at least four children.

By 1823, silhouette-cutting as a profession was in decline, and Williams had to sell his house. According to the Author's Note in The Poison Place, a novel about Moses Williams, he was listed in city directories as a profile cutter until 1833. There is no scholarly consensus on his exact date of death, with estimates ranging from 1825 to 1833, though the probability lies with the latter date.

== Public institutions ==
Williams' silhouettes can be found in the collections of several institutions, including the following:

- Philadelphia Museum of Art
- Museum of Fine Arts, Houston
- Library Company of Philadelphia
