= List of Lincoln University (Pennsylvania) alumni =

This list of Lincoln University alumni includes graduates, non-graduate former students and current students of Lincoln University, a historically black university (HBCU).

Lincoln University has many notable alumni, including Thurgood Marshall, Langston Hughes, Hildrus Poindexter, Horace Mann Bond, Roscoe Lee Browne, Robert L. Carter, Nnamdi Azikiwe, Kwame Nkrumah, and Melvin B. Tolson.

Name	Class year	Notability	Reference(s)
Ebenezer Ako-Adjei		Ghanaian politician, member of the United Gold Coast Convention and The Big Six	
Frederick D. Alexander	1931	businessman, civil rights activist	
Walter G. Alexander	1899	first African-American to serve in the New Jersey Legislature	
Brenda A. Allen	1981	psychologist and second female president of Lincoln University (2017–)	
William T. Amiger	B.A. 1899; M.A. 1902; S.T.B. 1902	educator, Baptist minister, president of State University at Louisville (now Simmons College of Kentucky), and American Baptist Theological Seminary (now American Baptist College)	
Charles E. Anderson	1941	first African-American to earn a Ph.D. in Meteorology	
Nnamdi Azikiwe	1930	first president of Nigeria	
Phillip Banks III	1984	first African-American chief of the New York Police Department	
Harry W. Bass	1888	first African-American elected to the Pennsylvania General Assembly in 1910	
A.A. Birch, Jr.	1952	first African-American to serve as chief justice of the Tennessee Supreme Court	
Edward Wilmot Blyden III	1948	Sierra Leonean diplomat, political scientist and editor	
Donald Bogle	1966	film historian, author, educator	
Horace Mann Bond	1923	educator, scholar; first African-American and alumnus to become president of Lincoln University	
Oscar Brown, Jr.	1940	singer, actor, playwright, director	
Roscoe Lee Browne	1946	actor, former 800-meters record holder	
Isaac D. Burrell	1890	physician and pharmacist	
Maria Louisa Bustill		teacher and mother of Paul Robeson	
Cab Calloway	1930	entertainer, bandleader	
Robert L. Carter	1937	general counsel of the NAACP, United States district judge	
Joseph Newman Clinton	1873	Florida politician; U.S. Internal Revenue Service Collector in Tampa for 14 years	
Frank "Tick" Coleman	1935	educator	
William A. Creditt	B.A. 1885; Hon. D.D. 1898; Hon. LL.D. 1911	Baptist minister, educator, civil rights activist, and co-founder of Downingtown Industrial and Agricultural School in Pennsylvania	
Alexander Darnes	1876	born into slavery, owned by Confederate General Edmund Kirby Smith; second African-American physician in Florida	
Horace Dawson	1949	U.S. ambassador to Botswana	
James A. Donaldson	1961	longtime Howard University mathematics professor and dean; established the first mathematics PhD program at a HBCU	
Lillian E. Fishburne	1971	first African-American woman promoted to the rank of rear admiral in the U.S. Navy	
Christian Fleetwood	1860	served in the Union Army during the American Civil War, earned the Medal of Honor	
William Fontaine	1930	philosopher	
Archibald H. Grimke	1870	lawyer, journalist, public speaker, member of the Niagara Movement	
Francis J. Grimké	1870	pastor of the Fifteenth Street Presbyterian Church in Washington, D.C., member of the Niagara Movement	
Joseph Winthrop Holley	1897	founder of Albany State College	
William E. Holmes		former president of Central City College, faculty of the Atlanta Baptist Institute, now Morehouse College, for 25 years	
Langston Hughes	1929	poet	
Roderick L. Ireland	1966	first African-American associate justice of the Massachusetts Supreme Judicial Court	
Montford "Monte" Irvin	attended, early 1950s	New York Giants player; inducted into the Baseball Hall of Fame in 1973	
Brian Jackson	1973	keyboardist, writer	
Robert Walter "Whirlwind" Johnson	1924	physician, educator, tennis instructor of Althea Gibson and Arthur Ashe	
Muhammad Kenyatta	attended, 1960s	Baptist minister, civil rights leader; ran for mayor of Philadelphia, 1975	
Pee Wee Kirkland	2000	former street basketball player from New York City; played at Rucker Park in the 1970 and 1971 seasons	
Saara Kuugongelwa	1994	Namibian politician, prime minister of Namibia	
Raphael O'Hara Lanier	1923	U.S. minister to Liberia; first president of Texas Southern University	
Robert Lee	1941	South Carolina-born dentist, emigrated to Ghana in 1956 and operated a dental practice there for nearly five decades until his retirement in 2002	
Matthew M. Lewey	1870	attorney, Florida state legislator, journalist, author	
Gordon J. Linton	1970	public servant, member of the Pennsylvania House of Representatives from the 200th District; administrator of the Federal Transit Administration, US Department of Transportation	
William P. Mabson		politician	
Cecil Mack	1897	composer, lyricist and music publisher	
Max Manning	attended, 1937	Newark Eagles player	
Thurgood Marshall	1930	first African-American Supreme Court Justice	
Thomas E. Miller	1872	member, U. S. House of Representatives from South Carolina; first president of South Carolina State University	
Joseph Miró	1970	politician, member of the Delaware House of Representatives from the 22nd district	
Clarence M. Mitchell, Jr.	1932	NAACP lobbyist ("101st U.S. senator"), civil rights leader	
Aaron Albert Mossell	1885	attorney, first African-American to graduate from the University of Pennsylvania School of Law	
Nathan Francis Mossell	1879	physician, first African-American to graduate from the University of Pennsylvania School of Medicine	
Donald Mullett	1951	academic administrator, interim president of Lincoln University as well as Cheyney University of Pennsylvania and Lincoln University (Missouri)	
Larry Neal	1961	Black Arts Movement leader in the 1960s	
Robert N. C. Nix Sr.	1921	first African-American elected to Congress from Pennsylvania	
Kwame Nkrumah	1939	first president of the modern Ghana	
Sheila Y. Oliver	1974	first African-American female speaker of the New Jersey General Assembly and lieutenant governor of New Jersey	
Barrington D. Parker	1936	U.S. Court of Appeals justice	
Cherelle Parker	1994	100th mayor of Philadelphia, first African-American woman elected to the role	
John H. Paynter	1884	poet; nonfiction writer; US government employee	
Harold E. Pierce	1942	dermatologist and cosmetic surgeon	
Fayette Pinkney	1984	singer, one of the original members of the group The Three Degrees	
Hildrus Poindexter	1924	bacteriologist; head of Howard University Medical School in 1934	
Edward S. Porter	1873	physician	
Joseph C. Price	1879	founder of Livingstone College	
Charles H. Roberts		first of two African Americans elected to the New York City Board of Aldermen	
William Drew Robeson I	1876	minister, father of Paul Robeson	
James H. Robinson	1935	founder of Operation Crossroads Africa (a model for the Peace Corps); chapters 8, 9 and 10 of Robinson's 1950 autobiography, Road Without Turning, describe life at Lincoln in the early 1930s	
Charles R. Saunders	1968	author and journalist; pioneer in the "sword and soul" literary genre	
Gil Scott-Heron	attended, early 1970s	activist, singer-songwriter	
Abdulalim A. Shabazz	1949	professor of Mathematics, chairman of the Mathermatics and Computer Science Department at Lincoln University (Pennsylvania) 1998–2000	
James Francis Shober	1875	first professionally trained African-American physician in North Carolina	
Francis Cecil Sumner	1915	father of Black psychology; first African-American to receive a Ph.D in psychology	
Wilbert "Bill" Tatum	1958	publisher emeritus of The New York Amsterdam News	
Julius Taylor	1938	physics professor, established physics department at Morgan State University	
Clive Terrelonge	1994	Olympic track and field athlete from Jamaica	
Mose Penaani Tjitendero	1968	Namibian politician; former speaker of the National Assembly of Namibia; chairman, SWAPO Central Committee	
Tjama Tjivikua	1983	vice-chancellor of the Namibia University of Science and Technology	
Melvin B. Tolson	1924	poet, educator, columnist, and politician	
James L. Usry	1946	first African-American mayor of Atlantic City, New Jersey	
Mahlon Van Horne	1868	first African-American to serve in the Rhode Island General Assembly	
Joseph Cornelius Waddy	1935	federal judge	
Herb J. Wesson Jr.	1999	speaker of the California State Assembly	
Albert H. Wheeler	1936	first African-American mayor of Ann Arbor, Michigan	
Boyce Courtney Williams	1974	vice president of National Council for the Accreditation of Teacher Education	
Franklin Williams	1941	diplomat; former president of Phelps Stokes Fund; former assistant attorney general of California	
Waverly B. Woodson Jr.	1948	United States Army soldier	
Bruce M. Wright	1942	judge in New York and Connecticut, author of Black Robes, White Justice	
