= List of Beta Kappa Chi chapters =

Beta Kappa Chi is an American collegiate honor society that recognizes academic achievements in the fields of natural science and mathematics. It was established in 1923 at Lincoln University, a historically Black university near Oxford, Pennsylvania.

Beta Kappa Chi chapters were originally assigned Greek letter names in alphabetical order. In 1950, the society abolished Greek letter names and renamed chapters by their host institutions.

In the following list of Beta Kappa Chi chapters, inactive institutions are indicated in italics.

| Chapter and institution | Old chapter name | Charter date and range | Location | Status | Ref. |
|---|---|---|---|---|---|
| Lincoln University | Alpha | January 31, 1923 | Lincoln University, Pennsylvania | Active | |
| West Virginia State University | Beta | May 8, 1926 | Institute, West Virginia | Active | |
| Howard University | Gamma | c. 1929–193x ?; 1943 | Washington, D.C. | Active | |
| Johnson C. Smith University | Delta | 193x ?–193x ?; March 11, 1943 | Charlotte, North Carolina | Active | (Note: The local science club revived the chapter in 1941.) |
| Lincoln University | Epsilon | 193x ? | Jefferson City, Missouri | Active | |
| Virginia Union University | Zeta | 193x ? | Richmond, Virginia | Active | |
| Morgan State University | Eta | before 1936 | Baltimore, Maryland | Active | |
| Virginia State University | Theta | before 1936 | Ettrick, Virginia | Active | |
| Storer College | Iota | 1942 | Harpers Ferry, West Virginia | Inactive | (Note: The college closed in 1955.) |
| Hampton University | Kappa | 1943 | Hampton, Virginia | Active | (Note: Hampton University was originally the Kappa chapter.) |
| Wilberforce University | Lambda | 194x (between 1943 and 1945) | Wilberforce, Ohio | Inactive | |
| Lane College | Mu | 194x (between 1943 and 1945) | Jackson, Tennessee | Active | |
| Southern University | Nu | 194x (between 1943 and 1945) | Scotlandville, Baton Rouge, Louisiana | Active | |
| Tennessee State University | Xi | March 8, 1944 | Nashville, Tennessee | Active | |
| Louisville Municipal College | Omicron | 194x (between 1943 and 1945) | Louisville, Kentucky | Inactive | |
| North Carolina Central University | Pi | April 1944 | Durham, North Carolina | Active | |
| Philander Smith University | Rho | April 1944 | Little Rock, Arkansas | Active | |
| Tuskegee University | Sigma | 194x (between 1943 and 1945) | Tuskegee, Alabama | Active | |
| Miner Teachers College | Tau | 1944 | Washington, D.C. | Inactive | (Note: The college merged with Wilson Teachers College, its white counterpart, to create the District of Columbia Teachers College in 1955.) |
| Livingstone College | Upsilon | 1944 | Salisbury, North Carolina | Active | |
| Fort Valley State University | Phi | 1944 | Fort Valley, Georgia | Active | |
| LeMoyne College | Chi | 194x (1944 or 1945) | Memphis, Tennessee | ? | |
| Fisk University | Psi | 194x (1944 or 1945) | Nashville, Tennessee | Active | |
| Kentucky State University | Omega | 194x (1944 or 1945) | Frankfort, Kentucky | Active | |
| North Carolina A&T State University | Alpha Alpha | 194x (in range 1946–1950) | Greensboro, North Carolina | Active | |
| Atlanta University Center | Alpha Beta | 194x (in range 1946–1950) | Atlanta, Georgia | Active | (Note: Collaboration of Clark Atlanta University, Spelman College, Morehouse College, and the Morehouse School of Medicine.) |
| Prairie View A&M University | Alpha Gamma | 194x (in range 1946–1950) | Prairie View, Texas | Active | |
| Bluefield State University | Alpha Delta | 194x (in range 1946–1950) | Bluefield, West Virginia | Active | |
| Alabama State University | Alpha Epsilon | 194x (in range 1946–1950) | Montgomery, Alabama | Active | |
| Bennett College | Alpha Zeta | 194x (in range 1946–1950) | Greensboro, North Carolina | Active | |
| South Carolina State University | Alpha Eta | 194x (in range 1946–1950) | Orangeburg, South Carolina | Active | |
| Benedict College | Alpha Theta | 194x (in range 1946–1950) | Columbia, South Carolina | Active | |
| Central State University | Alpha Iota | 194x (in range 1946–1950) | Wilberforce, Ohio | Active | |
| Duquesne University | Alpha Kappa | 194x (in range 1946–1950) | Pittsburgh, Pennsylvania | ? | |
| Bethune–Cookman University | | 195x (in range 1950–1953) | Daytona Beach, Florida | Active | |
| Shaw University | | 195x (in range 1950–1953) | Raleigh, North Carolina | Active | |
| Texas Southern University | | 195x (in range 1950–1953) | Houston, Texas | Active | |
| Arkansas State University | | 195x (in range 1950–1953) | Jonesboro, Arkansas | ? | |
| Bishop College | | 195x (in range 1950–1953) | Dallas, Texas | ? | |
| Texas College | | April 7, 1953 | Tyler, Texas | Active | |
| Savannah State University | | 1953 | Savannah, Georgia | Active | |
| Florida A&M University | | January 6, 1953 | Tallahassee, Florida | Active | |
| Dillard University | | 195x (in range 1953–1958) | New Orleans, Louisiana | Active | |
| Talladega College | | 195x (in range 1953–1958) | Talladega, Alabama | Active | |
| Grambling State University | | 195x (in range 1953–1958) | Grambling, Louisiana | Active | |
| Knoxville College | | 195x (in range 1953–1958) | Knoxville, Tennessee | Active | |
| Tougaloo College | | 195x (in range 1953–1958) | Tougaloo, Mississippi | Active | |
| Huston–Tillotson University | | 1962 | Austin, Texas | Active | |
| Norfolk State University | | 1962 | Norfolk, Virginia | Active | |
| Fayetteville State University | | 1963 | Fayetteville, North Carolina | Active | |
| Delaware State University | | 1963 | Dover, Delaware | Active | |
| Alcorn State University | | 1963 | Lorman, Mississippi | Active | |
| Alabama A&M University | | 1964 | Normal, Alabama | Active | |
| Langston University | | 1967 | Langston, Oklahoma | Active | |
| Barber–Scotia College | | 1968 | Concord, North Carolina | ? | |
| Jackson State College | | 1969 | Jackson, Mississippi (?) | ? | |
| University of Maryland Eastern Shore | | 1970 | Princess Anne, Maryland | Active | |
| Cheyney University of Pennsylvania | | April 1975 | Cheyney, Pennsylvania | Active | |
| Alvernia University | | 2005 | Reading, Pennsylvania | Active | |
| Jackson State University | | 2013 | Jackson, Mississippi | Active | |
| Agnes Scott College | | | Decatur, Georgia | Active | |
| Albany State University | | | Albany, Georgia | Active | |
| Clark Atlanta University | | | Atlanta, Georgia | Active | |
| Coppin State University | | | Baltimore, Maryland | Active | |
| Florida Memorial University | | | Miami Gardens, Florida | Active | |
| Georgia Gwinnett College | | | Lawrenceville, Georgia | Active | |
| Jacksonville State University | | | Jacksonville, Alabama | Active | |
| Jarvis Christian College | | | Hawkins, Texas | Active | |
| Miles College | | | Fairfield, Alabama | Active | |
| Mississippi Valley State University | | | Mississippi Valley State, Mississippi | Active | |
| Morehouse College | | | Atlanta, Georgia | Active | |
| Paul Quinn College | | | Dallas, Texas | Active | |
| St. Augustine's University | | | Raleigh, North Carolina | Active | |
| Southern University at New Orleans | | | New Orleans, Louisiana | Active | |
| Spelman College | | | Atlanta, Georgia | Active | |
| Stillman College | | | Tuscaloosa, Alabama | Active | |
| Trinity Washington University | | | Washington, D.C. | Active | |
| University of Arkansas at Pine Bluff | | | Pine Bluff, Arkansas | Active | |
| University of the District of Columbia | | | Washington, D.C. | Active | |
| Wiley University | | | Marshall, Texas | Active | |
| Winston-Salem State University | | | Winston-Salem, North Carolina | Active | |

Graduate chapters were chartered at one point, Alpha Chi graduate chapter was in Chicago.
