= Rendall (surname) =

Rendall is a surname that may refer to:

- Athelstan Rendall (1871–1948), British politician
- Athelstan Rendall (pilot) (1914–2006), British pilot
- David Rendall (tenor) (1948–2025), English opera singer
- George Rendall (c. 1791–1837), British colonial governor in the Gambia
- Gerald Rendall (1851–1945), English educator and college administrator
- Isaac Norton Rendall (1825–1912), American minister and college administrator
- John Ballard Rendall (1847–1924), American minister, educator, and politician
- Jonathan Rendall (1964–2013), British writer
- Kimble Rendall (1957–2025), Australian musician and director
- Mark Rendall (born 1988), Canadian actor
- Paul Rendall (1954–2023), English rugby union player
- Robert Rendall (1898–1967), Scottish poet and amateur naturalist
- Tom Rendall (1933–2002), Canadian ice hockey player
