= Rundall =

Rundall is a surname. Notable people with the surname include:

- Francis Rundall (1908–1987), British diplomat
- Mary Ann Rundall (died 1839), British educational writer

== See also ==
- Randall (surname)
- Rendall (surname)
- Rundell (disambiguation)
