= George Rowe =

George Rowe may refer to:

- George Rowe (cricketer) (1874–1950), South African cricketer
- George Rowe (footballer) (born 1968), Scottish footballer and manager, mainly with Queen of the South
- George Rowe (printmaker) (1796–1864), Cheltenham printmaker, lithographer and businessman
- George Rowe (sport shooter) (1874–1952), Canadian sports shooter
- George Rowe (actor) (1894–1975), American character actor
- George C. Rowe, American missionary, minister, and poet
- George Duncan Rowe (1857–1934), British stockbroker, co-founder of Rowe & Pitman
- George Fawcett Rowe (1832–1889), actor and dramatist in Australia, UK, US
- George Thomas Rowe, British sailor, quartermaster aboard RMS Titanic

== See also ==
- George Roe, owner of the now defunct Thomas Street Distillery, Dublin
