= Hood Theological Seminary =

Christian seminary in Salisbury, North Carolina

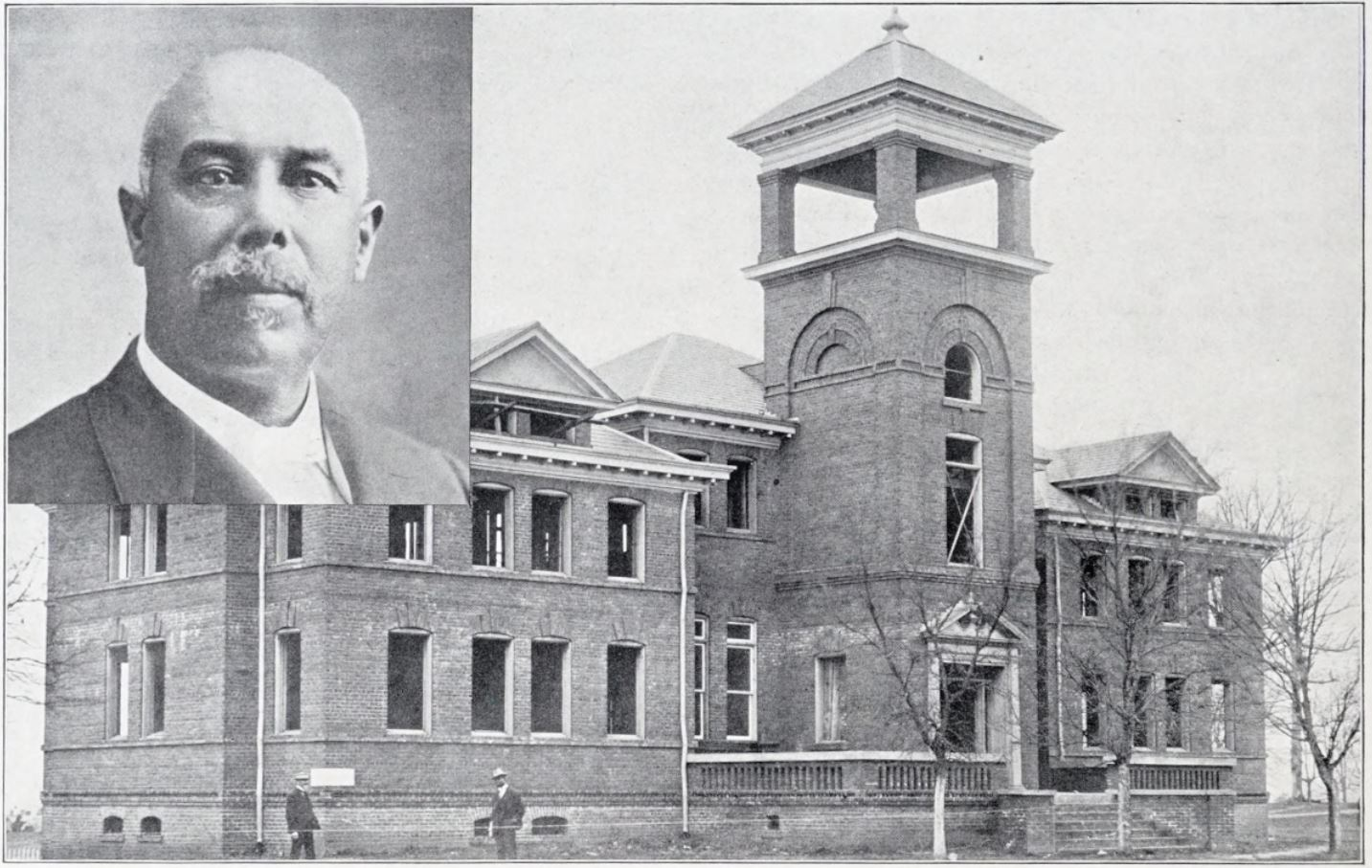
The seminary and its president, W. H. Goler, c. 1910

Hood Theological Seminary is a Christian seminary sponsored by the African Methodist Episcopal Zion Church in Salisbury, North Carolina. It is a graduate and professional school sponsored by the African Methodist Episcopal Zion Church (A.M.E. Zion) and approved by the University Senate of The United Methodist Church. From its founding in 1879 until 2001, the seminary was part of Livingstone College; it is now independent. The seminary is accredited by the Association of Theological Schools in the United States and Canada.

== History ==
The Hood Theological Seminary was founded in 1879 and is named for Bishop James Walker Hood.

The first building was erected one last purchased by Hood from a fundraiser campaigner that he executed in London, England, acquiring $3,000 from London and another $1000 from the City of Salisbury. The institute opened in 1882, with Joseph Charles Price named the institution’s first president—who served as president until his death in 1893. During his tenure the seminary, the school’s collegiate school became the arts and science faculty, with Hood Theological Seminary became the theological department at Livingston. The first dean was George Lincoln Blackwell, and the institution was originally affiliated with the African Methodist Episcopal Zion Church.

A PhD program existed at the school from 1895 until its dissolution in 1902. The school of divinity inaugurated its Bachelor of Divinity in 1903.

In 1904 the college began raising funds for a building to house the seminary. The cornerstone for the $20,000 building was laid in 1906, and the school was named for Hood. By the 1927 the graduate divinity program ceased operations, as did its teaching programs. After reorganization, Hood reopened in 1934 as a graduate school and gained full accreditation.

In 1965 the school moved into a new, three-story building that featured an A-frame chapel. The top floor contained dorm rooms for single students and married-student apartments. On the second (main) floor were the library and faculty offices, while the ground floor offered classrooms and a student lounge. That building served very well for an era when the student body was relatively small and nearly all male.

In 1994 the Livingstone College board stepped outside of AME Zion ranks to hire United Methodist scholar Dr. Albert J. D. Aymer as the Dean of Hood Theological Seminary. A native of Antigua, Aymer was trained at the London School of Theology, Lancaster Theological Seminary, and Drew University. He had taught for fourteen years at Drew University Divinity School, where he served as Associate Dean and Director of the Doctor of Ministry Program. Aymer sparked a new era of explosive growth at Hood by raising the quality of the library, updating the curriculum for the Master of Divinity program, converting the Master of Religious Education program to a Master of Theological Studies, creating a certificate program to help train ministers who lacked bachelor's degrees, launching a Doctor of Ministry program, and securing official approval to prepare students for ordained ministry in the United Methodist Church. He also increased the size, quality, and ecumenical diversity of the faculty. Within a few years, the student body grew from thirty to three hundred, and those students came from a dozen different denominations and included a high percentage of women. Most unusual for a historically black school, in any given year as many as a third of the students were now white.

The school began operating separately from Livingstone College in 2001 and began a fully independent accredited institution in 2002. In 2004, the school moved again, this time to what had once been a Holiday Inn motel. The seminary hired local Salisbury architect Karen Kirks Alexander to redesign some buildings into modern classroom, office and chapel spaces, still leaving plenty of rooms for housing and space to build a new, multipurpose activity building and dining hall. The new facilities could accommodate the much larger student body.

Dr. Albert J. D. Aymer was the first president of Hood after it became fully independent. Dr. Vergel L. Lattimore is presently the President and Professor of Pastoral Psychology and Counseling.

== Academics ==
The seminary is accredited by Association of Theological Schools. The institution awards Master of Divinity (M.Div.), Master of Theological Studies (MTS), and Doctor of Ministry (D.Min.) degrees.

== Institute of Early Career Clergy Development ==
The IECCD seeks to provide early-career clergy with the tools for sustainable and bold ministry in the 21st century. Through consultation, education, mentoring, and partnership, early-career clergy learn the best practices for challenging their congregations to be bolder in their faith and outreach. They also learn the best practices for managing the daily challenges that pastors face in their congregational settings.

The IECCD is part of Lilly Endowment Inc.’s Thriving in Ministry, an initiative that supports a variety of religious organizations across the nation as they create or strengthen programs that help pastors build relationships with experienced clergy who can serve as mentors and guide them through key leadership challenges in congregational ministry.

== Notable people ==
=== Faculty and staff ===
- Albert J. D. Aymer: emeritus, president, Hood Theological Seminary
- Trevor Eppehimer: academic dean, Messinger-Williams Associate Professor in Theology and Ethics
- Vergel L. Lattimore: president, professor of pastoral psychology and counseling
- Dora Rudo Mbuwayesango: dean of students, George E. and Iris Battle Professor of Old Testament and Languages
- Andre’ Resner: research professor, professor, homiletics, preaching and worship

=== Notable alumni ===
- George Battle Jr.: bishop of the African Methodist Episcopal Zion Church
- George D. Crenshaw: bishop of the African Methodist Episcopal Zion Church
- Alfred G. Dunston: deceased bishop of the African Methodist Episcopal Church and author, Black Man in the Old Testament
- Michael A. Frencher: bishop of the African Methodist Episcopal Zion Church
- Darrin H. Mitchell: pastor, Trinity A.M.E. Zion Church, Greensboro, North Carolina, adjunct professor of pastoral theology, HTS
- Darryl B. Starnes Sr.: bishop of the African Methodist Episcopal Zion Church
- George W.C Walker Sr.: retired bishop of the African Methodist Episcopal Zion Church
- Leon Watts: Yale School of Divinity, associate professor of pastoral theology, 1971–1987
