= Ivory V. Nelson =

American chemist and university president

12th President of Lincoln University
- In office August 15, 1999 – November 2011
- Preceded by: James A. Donaldson
- Succeeded by: Robert R. Jennings

President of Central Washington University
- In office 1992 – February 1999

Personal details
- Born: June 11, 1934 (age 91) Shreveport, Louisiana, US
- Education: Grambling State University; University of Kansas
- Occupation: Chemist, educator, academic administrator

Ivory V. Nelson (born June 11, 1934) is an American chemist, educator, and academic administrator who served as president of Central Washington University from 1992 to 1999 and president of Lincoln University of Pennsylvania from 1999 to 2011.

== Life and career ==
Nelson was born in Shreveport, Louisiana. After graduating from Booker T. Washington High School in Shreveport in 1951, he enlisted in the United States Air Force, where he served three years. He graduated magna cum laude from Grambling State University in 1959, earning a Bachelor of Science degree in chemistry and secondary education. He went on to receive a PhD in analytical chemistry from the University of Kansas in 1963. He was the first Grambling alumnus to go on to earn a PhD, and the first African American to earn a PhD in chemistry from the University of Kansas. He subsequently became a professor of chemistry at Prairie View A&M University, a historically black land-grant university located in Prairie View, Texas.

Nelson received a Fulbright Lectureship and served as department chair, assistant dean of academic affairs, and vice president for research at Prairie View A&M University. In 1982, he served as the university's acting president for nine months. In 1983, he left Prairie View to become executive assistant to the chancellor of the Texas A&M University System. From 1986 to March 1992, he was the first African American to serve as chancellor of the Alamo Community College District, San Antonio, Texas.

Nelson served as president of Central Washington University from early 1992 to February 1999. He was the university's first African American president. Many faculty and students protested that his hire was orchestrated by the Black chairwoman of the board of trustees. In November 1998, responding to low faculty salaries, presidential opposition to a proposed faculty union, and other grievances, Central Washington University's faculty senate issued a resounding vote of no-confidence in President Nelson. The motion carried by a margin of 63%. Nelson retired a few months later.

Nelson next served as the twelfth president of Lincoln University in Oxford, Pennsylvania, from August 15, 1999, to November 2011, when he retired. He revitalized the faltering historically black university. During his tenure, Lincoln University increased student enrollment, paid off its $15 million debt, eliminated operating deficits, and secured $325 million in public and private funding for the construction and renovation of campus infrastructure. The Ivory V. Nelson Science Center, which opened in the fall of 2009 on Lincoln's campus, was named in his honor. The building houses Lincoln's mathematics, computer science, biology, chemistry, and physics departments.

In 2017, Nelson came out of retirement to serve as interim provost of Jackson State University.
