= John Pym Carter =

American minister and university president (1811–1892)

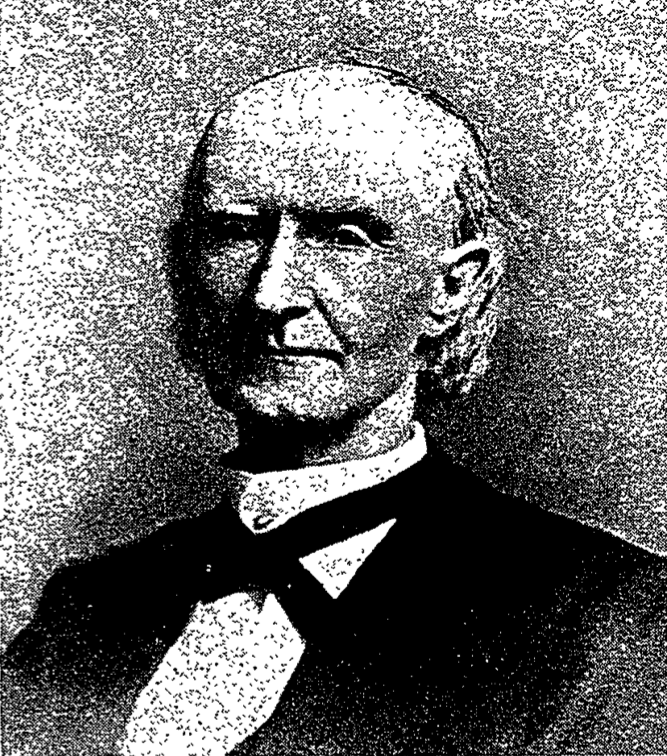

2nd President of Lincoln University
- In office October 8, 1856 – 1861
- Preceded by: John Miller Dickey
- Succeeded by: John Wynne Martin

Personal details
- Born: 1811 Plymouth, England
- Died: January 6, 1892 (aged 80–81) Washington, D.C., US
- Education: Georgetown University
- Occupation: Minister, educator

John Pym Carter (1811 – January 6, 1892) was an American Presbyterian minister and educator who served as the second president of the Ashmun Institute, which became Lincoln University, a historically black university in Oxford, Pennsylvania. He served from October 8, 1856, to 1861. He concurrently served as the sole faculty member and instructor, providing a general college education as well as seminary training to prepare his students for Presbyterian ordination and missionary work.

== Early life and education ==
Carter was born in Plymouth, England, in 1811 and immigrated to America with his parents when he was five years old. The family settled in Washington, D.C. Carter attended Georgetown University and married Martha Webb, a native of Baltimore, where he settled after graduation. He converted to Presbyterianism in 1834 and became an ordained minister in 1838.

== Ashmun Institute ==
The Ashmun Institute had only four students when it opened on January 1, 1857, after receiving its state charter in 1854. John Miller Dickey, the school's founder and president of the board of trustees, offered Carter a salary of $700 per year, along with use of a house and farm on campus. Twenty African American men passed through the school during Carter's tenure. He taught geography, history, grammar, composition, elocution, mathematics, classical languages, theology, and prayer.

Dickey and Carter eschewed abolitionism. Carter insisted that the Institute did not seek to "interfere in any way with the claims of masters to their servants; nor to preach a crusade against the institution of domestic Slavery, as it exists in the South." Rather, the Ashmun Institute was committed to "the noble cause of Africa education, missions, and colonization." Its first three graduates, Armisted Miller, James R. Amos, and Thomas H. Amos, emigrated to Liberia as missionaries.

John Wynne Martin, minister of Doe Run Presbyterian Church, joined the school as its second faculty member and professor of languages and church history in the autumn of 1860. Carter quit the school in the spring of 1861, and Martin was appointed to succeed him. The school struggled financially during the ensuing years, and the board of trustees forced Martin to resign the presidency in 1865. Carter returned to deliver the theological commencement address at Lincoln University in 1889.

== Later life ==
After leaving the Ashmun Institute, Carter taught briefly at New London Academy in New London Township, Pennsylvania, and then returned to his native Baltimore, where he founded and operated the Maryland Collegiate Institute until 1869. He served as chief clerk of the naval office of the Baltimore Custom House for eighteen years and served as Stated Clerk of the Baltimore Presbytery from 1866 until his death, and as Stated Clerk of the Synod from 1870 until his death.

Carter died after a brief illness in Washington, D.C., on January 6, 1892, at the age of 81.
