= John Miller Dickey =

American minister, educator, and president of Lincoln University of Pennsylvania

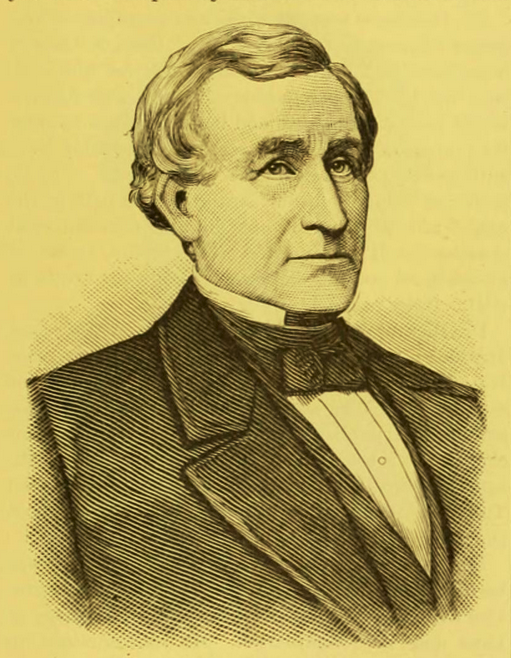

1st President of Lincoln University
- In office 1854–1856
- Succeeded by: John Pym Carter

Personal details
- Born: December 15, 1806 Oxford, Pennsylvania, U.S.
- Died: March 2, 1878 (aged 71) Philadelphia, U.S.
- Spouse: Sarah Emlen Cresson
- Relatives: Ebenezer V. Dickey (brother)
- Education: Dickinson College, Princeton Theological Seminary
- Occupation: Minister, educator

John Miller Dickey (December 15, 1806 – March 2, 1878) was an American Presbyterian minister. He and his wife, Sarah Emlen Cresson, a Quaker, founded Ashmun Institute on May 24, 1854, which was renamed Lincoln University in 1866 following the assassination of President Abraham Lincoln. They named the school after Jehudi Ashmun, a religious leader and social reformer. They founded the school for the education and religious training of African American men, whose opportunities were limited. Lincoln University is the oldest historically black college or university in the United States.

Dickey served as the first president of Ashmun Institute from 1854 to 1856 and continued to chair its board of trustees until his death twenty-two years later. Eschewing abolitionism and anti-slavery agitation, he supported the establishment of Liberia as a colony for African Americans and was active in the American Colonization Society. Dickey encouraged his students, James Ralston Amos (1826–1864), his brother Thomas Henry Amos (1825–1869), and Armistead Hutchinson Miller (1829/30–1865), to become missionaries in Africa or among African Americans. All three men became ordained ministers.

The son of a Presbyterian minister, Dickey was born in Oxford, Pennsylvania, and graduated from Dickinson College in 1824 and from Princeton Theological Seminary in 1827, where he earned his doctoral degree in divinity. After conducting missionary work in Pennsylvania, Florida, and Georgia and serving briefly as a pastor in New Castle, Delaware, Dickey settled in Oxford on June 15, 1832, where he served two local churches through April 9, 1856, when he retired due to ill health. For fifteen years he presided over the Oxford Female Seminary, and for twenty years he served on the board of the Princeton Seminary. His brother Ebenezer V. Dickey was a physician and state representative.

== Honors ==
The John Miller Dickey Hall at Lincoln University was completed in 1991 with funds allocated by the Commonwealth of Pennsylvania. The building is a 60,000 square feet (5,600 m^{2}), three-story, steel-and-concrete structure.

== See also ==
- Rachel Creefield silhouette
