= Niara Sudarkasa =

American anthropologist (1938–2019)

- Sudarkasa in the 1990s
- Born: Gloria Albertha Marshall; August 14, 1938; Fort Lauderdale, Florida
- Died: May 31, 2019 (aged 80)
- Education: Ph.D. in anthropology, Columbia University (1964)
- Occupation: Anthropologist

Niara Sudarkasa (August 14, 1938 – May 31, 2019) was an American scholar, educator, Africanist and anthropologist who held thirteen honorary degrees, and was the recipient of nearly 100 civic and professional awards. In 1989 Essence magazine named her "Educator for the '90s", and in 2001 she became the first African American to be installed as a Chief in the historic Ife Kingdom of the Yoruba of Nigeria.

== Biography ==
Niara Sudarkasa was born Gloria Albertha Marshall on August 14, 1938, in Fort Lauderdale, Florida. Niara was a gifted student who skipped several grades in elementary. She graduated from high school and accepted early admission to Fisk University on a Ford Foundation scholarship when she was 15 years old. She left Fisk and transferred to Oberlin College, where she earned a bachelor's degree in 1957. She received her master's degree in anthropology from Columbia University. While completing her Ph.D. she taught at Columbia University, becoming the first African-American woman to teach there when she earned her Ph.D. in 1964. She acknowledged the help of anthropologist Alice Dewey in preparing for field work in the early 1960s.

Soon after earning her Ph.D., Sudarkasa was appointed assistant professor of anthropology at New York University, the first black woman to hold that position. She was also the first tenured African American professor to be appointed to the Department of Anthropology at the University of Michigan in 1969. While at Michigan, she became involved in civil rights and student issues, and became the first African American female director of the Center for Afroamerican and African Studies. When she left Michigan in 1986, Sudarkasa became the first female to serve as president of Lincoln University, the oldest historically black college in the United States.

During Surdarkasa's presidency at Lincoln University the school increased enrollment, strengthened its undergraduate and international programs and put into place an ambitious minority recruitment effort. She wanted to provide her student with a chance to look at their own African heritage, and this can be seen in her various art and antiques of West Africa displayed in her home.

In the late 1990s, after concerns over improper use of university funds, nepotism, and other financial irregularities led the state to withhold its $11m budget contribution, Sudarkas resigned from Lincoln University. She was succeeded by interim president James Donaldson, and then by Ivory Nelson.

Niara Sudarkasa was the Distinguished Scholar-in-Residence at the African-American Research Library and Cultural Center in Fort Lauderdale, Florida, and sat on the board of directors for several organizations including the Academy for Educational Development. Her personal papers can be found at the African-American Research Library and Cultural Center's Special Collections and Archives.

Sudarkasa died on May 31, 2019, at the age of 80. Her death was reported to be the result of various chronic illnesses throughout her lifetime.

== Bibliography ==
- The Strength of Our Mothers: African & African American Women & Families : Essays and Speeches (1997), Africa World Press.
- Where Women Work: a Study of Yoruba Women in the Marketplace and in the Home (1973), University of Michigan Press.
- The Barnes Bond Connection. with David Levering Lewis and Julian Bond (1995), Lincoln University Press.
- Exploring the African- American experience (1995), Lincoln University Press.
- Building a Partnership in Education: The key to African development (1992), NAFEO Excellence, Inc.
- Education Is Still the Key: Selected Speeches & Essays (1998), Africa World Press.
