= Robert R. Jennings =

American academic administrator

President of Lincoln University
- In office January 2, 2012 – November 24, 2014
- Preceded by: Ivory V. Nelson
- Succeeded by: Brenda A. Allen

President of Alabama A&M University
- In office 2006–2008

Personal details
- Born: Wichita, Kansas
- Education: Morehouse College; Clark Atlanta University

Robert R. Jennings is an American former academic administrator who served as president of Alabama A&M University from January 2006 to March 2008 and president of Lincoln University of Pennsylvania from 2012 to 2014.

== At Alabama A&M University ==
He came to AAMU from Future Focus 2020, Babcock Graduate School of Management, Wake Forest University, where he was the executive vice president and chief operating officer. There, he managed the daily operations of the agency which is dedicated to engaging and including minority involvement in significant social, technical, economic, and political trends.

Jennings also served as executive vice president to the president for institutional development and alumni affairs at Clark Atlanta University, as vice president for Development and Foundation at Norfolk State University in Virginia, as vice president of Institutional Advancement of Albany State University in Georgia, and vice chancellor for Development and University Relations at North Carolina A&T State University. He also served as Loaned Executive to the Office of the Administrator at the U.S. Environmental Protection Agency.

On March 31, 2008, the Board of Trustees of AAMU fired Jennings in response to allegations of impropriety regarding the employment of his assistant and of fixing student grades. Jennings and his legal counsel threatened to file suit against the university to reverse the decision.

== At Lincoln University ==
On November 19, 2011, Jennings was named president of Lincoln University, one of the nation's oldest historically black universities, and took office on January 2, 2012. He succeeded Ivory V. Nelson as president.

In September 2014, Jennings received criticism for a speech he gave to assembled female students at Lincoln University during All Women's Convocation. During the speech he warned female students to not file false rape reports simply because 'the relationship had not go their way', something he said had happened multiple times. However, nothing was mentioned of this subject in the All Men's Convocation. Also, the police have stated that there were no reports of false allegations of rape. On November 24, 2014, Jennings tendered his resignation.
