= Donald Mullett =

American educator and university president (1929–2013)

Interim President of Lincoln University (Pennsylvania)
- In office July 1, 1985 – February 1, 1987
- Preceded by: Herman Branson
- Succeeded by: Niara Sudarkasa

Interim President of Cheyney University of Pennsylvania
- In office June 1995 – July 1996
- Preceded by: H. Douglas Covington
- Succeeded by: W. Clinton Pettus

Personal details
- Born: Donald Leopold Mullett; April 10, 1929 New York City, U.S.
- Died: April 19, 2013 (aged 84) New York City
- Education: Lincoln University (Pennsylvania) (BA); New York University (MBA); University of Delaware (PhD)

Donald Leopold Mullett (April 10, 1929 – April 19, 2013) was an American educator and academic administrator who served as interim president at three historically black universities: Lincoln University (Pennsylvania), Cheyney University of Pennsylvania, and Lincoln University (Missouri).

== Early life and education ==
Mullett was born and raised in New York City, youngest of four children of Festus and Josephine Mullett. He graduated from Commerce High School in 1947 and received a BA in mathematics from Lincoln University (Pennsylvania) in 1951, an MBA from New York University in 1952, and a PhD in urban economics from the University of Delaware in 1981. He also served in the United States Army during the Korean War.

== Career ==
Mullett began his career in 1954 at the United Mutual Life Insurance Company in New York City, where he rose through the ranks to become vice president and assistant treasurer. He worked briefly as a cost analyst at the Equitable Assurance Company of America from 1962 to 1963 before transitioning to higher education administration, returning to Lincoln University in 1963 to serve as assistant to the vice president of fiscal affairs, comptroller, business manager, and (starting in 1969) vice president of fiscal affairs and treasurer. He served as Lincoln University's interim president from July 1, 1985, to February 1, 1987, succeeding the retiring Herman Branson and stepping aside upon the inauguration of Niara Sudarkasa.

Mullett left Lincoln in 1989 to serve as vice president of finance and fiscal affairs at Texas Southern University. He served as vice president of fiscal affairs at Jarvis Christian College from 1990 to 1993. He returned to Pennsylvania in 1993 to become vice president of business affairs at Cheyney University, serving as interim president from June 1995 to July 1996. He later served as interim president of Lincoln University in Missouri. He also served on the board of trustees at Lincoln University and later at Oakwood University before eventually retiring to Pearland, Texas.

== Personal life ==
Mullett was married to Mildred Mullett and had two daughters: Barbara Louise Mullett and Donna Mullett King. He was a lifelong Seventh Day Adventist and jazz aficionado. He died in 2013 at the age of 84.
