= Little England Chapel =

- U.S. National Register of Historic Places
- Virginia Landmarks Register
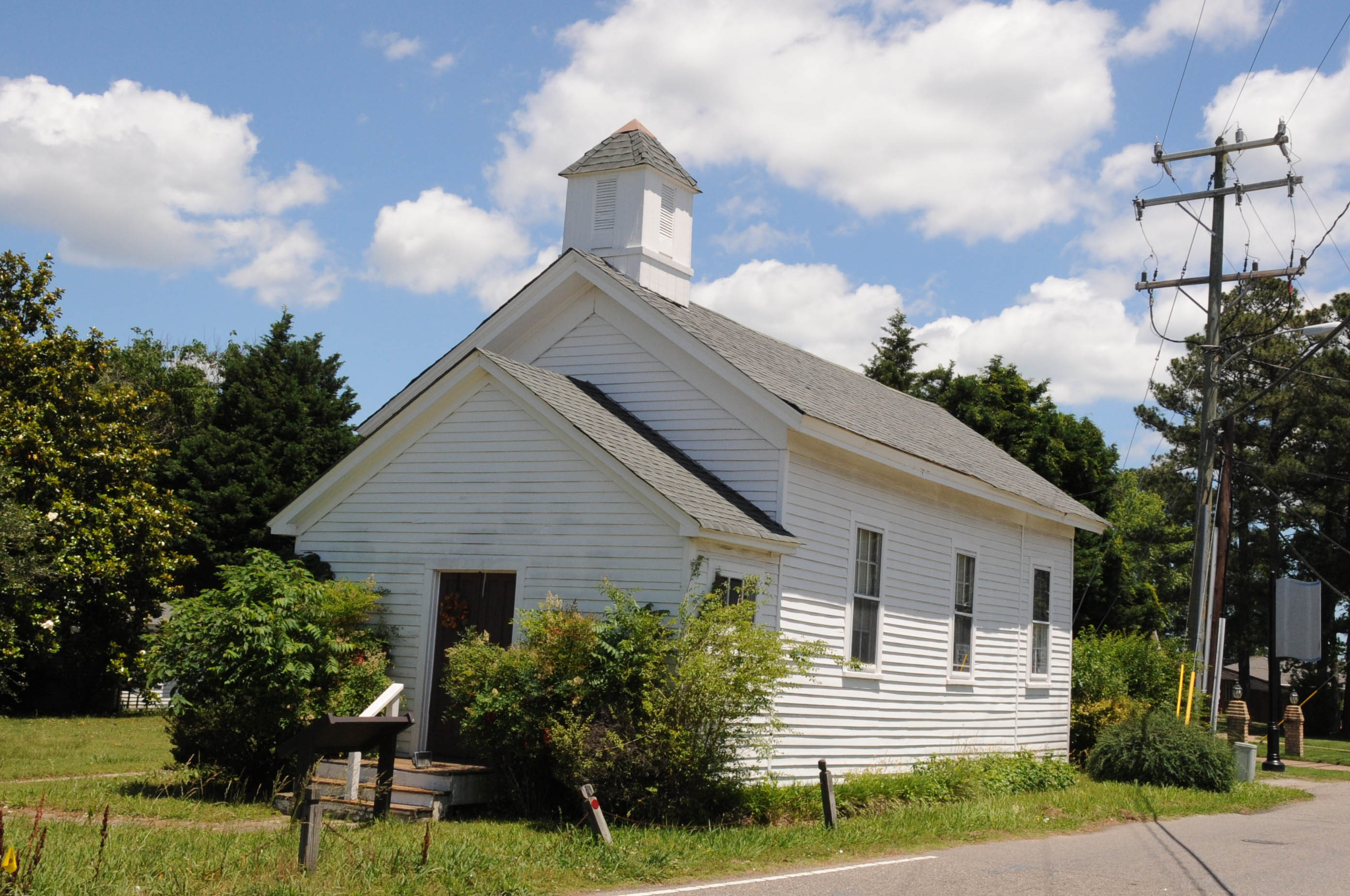

- Location within Virginia Location within the United States
- Location: 4100 Kecoughtan Rd., Hampton, Virginia
- Coordinates: 37°0′47″N 76°21′11″W
- Area: Newtown Community
- Built: 1878
- Architect: Hampton Institute Students
- Website: https://www.littleenglandchapel.org/
- NRHP reference No.: 82004564
- VLR No.: 114-0040

Significant dates
- Added to NRHP: July 08, 1982
- Designated VLR: June 16, 1981

Little England Chapel (originally called The Ocean Cottage Sunday School) was founded by George C. Rowe. A printer at Hampton Institute, Rowe began the Sunday school with three Newtown children, in a small section of his home. The Sunday school became so popular that they needed more space to hold the Bible sessions.

== History ==
In 1869, Daniel F. Cock set aside a triangular plot of thirty-five acres divided into thirty-three lots to be sold to black persons. This area was named "Cock's Newtown. In March 1870, the first six lots were sold at fifty dollars each. The last was sold in 1910. During this same period, blacks also purchased lots of comparable size at the same price from Charles Smith, Edward Whitehouse, and William N. Armstrong, brother of Samuel Armstrong, Principal of Hampton Institute. These lots were close to "Cock's Newtown" or close to the area where the Little England Chapel now stands. Subsequently, "Newtown" was applied to the entire black community.

In 1878, a large open arbor was built with ten rows of seating for academic and Sunday School classes on the property of Daniel Cock. The number of attendees grew to over 500 – too many to be accommodated in the open arbor. During that same summer Rowe met with William N. Armstrong, who offered the use of a small piece of land along Ivy Home Road, if the residents in the neighborhood would contribute toward the support of a day school teacher. The money was raised and the chapel opened in 1879. Students from Hampton Institute not only designed but built the school house. The work was overseen by William Armstrong.

By 1886, the chapel had become self-supporting and had grown from three to seventy children. The children of the chapel participated in missionary work for the community. As late as 1910, students from the institute rowed across the Hampton River to teach classes. In later years, they would travel by horse and buggy and the "School Chariot", a black shiny carriage drawn by two white horses. The students would serve as missionaries of the chapel for over fifty years.

In 1954, Captain Fred Cock gave the property to the Newtown Improvement Club and Civic Club "to be used by the Congregation of the Newtown Improvement Club for non-denominational religious purposes." In 1939, the Progressive Church of Jesus began holding regular services at the chapel. This continued until 1989, when the congregation then known as the Church of Jesus vacated the property.

Restoration of the chapel began in 1992. An addition was added to the north side of the chapel in 1993. The exterior was completely refurbished in 2008.
