= Ebenezer V. Dickey =

American politician (1821–1857)

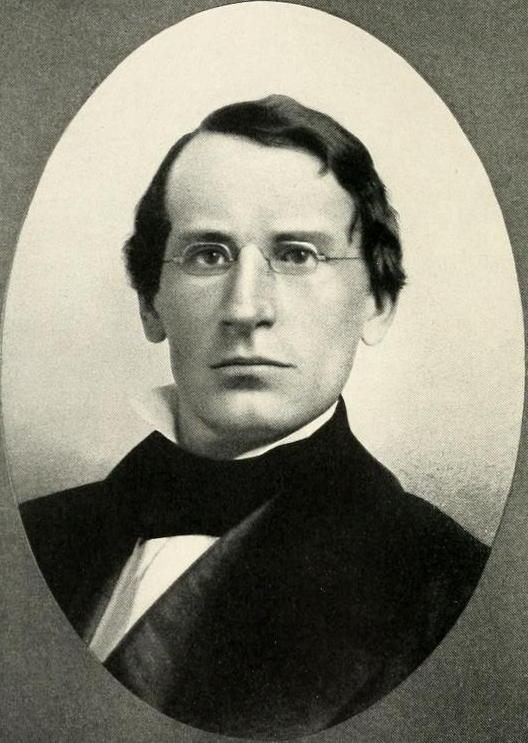
- Dickey in a 1904 publication

Member of the Pennsylvania House of Representatives from the Chester County district
- In office 1857–1857 Serving with James Penrose and Paxson Vickers
- Preceded by: Andrew Buchanan, Joseph Dowdall, Robert Irwin
- Succeeded by: John Hodgson, Eber W. Sharpe, Morton Garrett

Personal details
- Born: December 15, 1821
- Died: July 31, 1857 (aged 35)
- Party: Republican
- Spouse: Frances G. Ralston
- Children: 4
- Relatives: John Miller Dickey (brother)
- Education: Lafayette College; University of Pennsylvania
- Occupation: Politician; physician; educator

Ebenezer V. Dickey (December 15, 1821 – July 31, 1857) was an American politician and medical doctor from Pennsylvania. He served as a member of the Pennsylvania House of Representatives, representing Chester County in 1857.

== Early life ==
Ebenezer V. Dickey was born on December 15, 1821, to Ebenezer Dickey. He studied at Hopewell Academy and New London Academy. He started studying at Lafayette College in 1840, but later transferred to the University of Pennsylvania. He studied medicine there and graduated in 1844.

== Career ==
After graduating, Dickey practiced in Chester County. He was an instructor in chemistry and physiology at the Oxford Female Seminary. Dickey helped organize the Philadelphia and Baltimore Central Railroad and served on the board of directors from November 1853 to 1857. In January 1857, he was elected president of the board of directors. Due to illness, he resigned from the role five months later.

Dickey was appointed clerk of elections and assistant burgess in Oxford. In 1847, he served as chief burgess in Oxford. He was a Republican. He served as a member of the Pennsylvania House of Representatives, representing Chester County in 1857.

Dickey helped obtain a charter for and served as the first president of the Octoraro Bank at Oxford.

== Personal life ==
Dickey married Frances G. Ralston, daughter of Samuel Ralston. They had at least four children, including S. Ralston. His brother was reverend John Miller Dickey.

Dickey was struck with a severe cold in the winter that impacted his heart. In 1857, he traveled to Europe in hopes to combat his ailment. He died on July 31, 1857.
