= John Ballard Rendall =

American minister, educator, and politician (1847–1924)

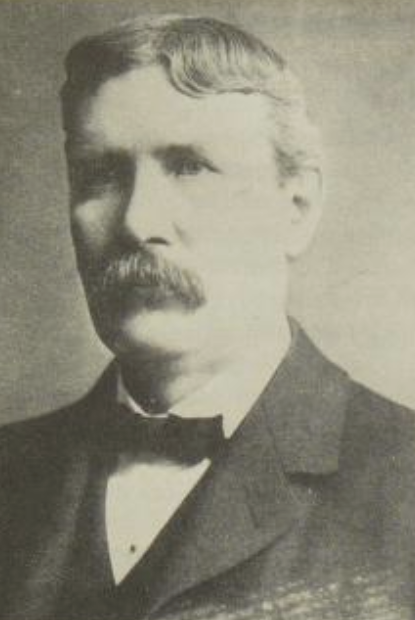

Member of the Pennsylvania House of Representatives
- In office 1899–1900

President of Lincoln University
- In office 1906–1924
- Preceded by: Isaac Norton Rendall
- Succeeded by: Walter Livingston Wright

Personal details
- Born: April 5, 1847 Madurai, India
- Died: September 3, 1924 (aged 77) Lower Oxford, Chester County, Pennsylvania, US
- Resting place: Oxford Cemetery, Oxford, Pennsylvania
- Citizenship: United States
- Education: Princeton University (AB, AM); Gale College (DD)
- Occupation: Minister, educator, politician

John Ballard Rendall (April 5, 1847 – September 3, 1924) was an American Presbyterian minister, educator, and politician. He served as a professor of Latin at the historically black Lincoln University of Pennsylvania from 1872 to 1906, president of Lincoln University from 1906 to 1924, and member of the Pennsylvania House of Representatives from 1899 to 1900.

== Biography ==
Rendall was born in Madurai, India, on April 5, 1847, to Congregationalist missionaries John and Jane (Ballard) Rendall. Of Scottish descent (from Orkney), his family returned to the United States when he was ten years old, and he was raised under the aegis of his uncle, Isaac Norton Rendall, a minister. Rendall graduated from Utica Academy in 1866 and received his AB from Princeton University in 1870, his AM from Princeton in 1873, and his doctorate in divinity from Gale College in 1900.

Rendall became principal of the preparatory department at Lincoln University in 1870 and became professor of Latin at Lincoln in 1872. He was ordained to the ministry in the Presbytery of Chester in 1876 and became clerk of the presbytery in 1894. He succeeded his late uncle, Isaac Norton Rendall, as Lincoln's president in 1906, serving until his death eighteen years later.

As president, John Ballard Rendall was popular and respected (and known to participate in the students' rough-and-tumble football games) but a poor fiscal manager. In 1906, Lincoln was the third wealthiest university in Pennsylvania when measured by endowment capital per student. The university's poor investment decisions, lackluster fundraising, overly generous tuition waivers, and even substantial embezzlement by a former financial officer depleted the university's endowment and resulted in Lincoln's running substantial operating deficits most years. Rendall Hall, a two-and-a-half-story brick building on Lincoln's campus that cost $25,000 to build, broke ground in June 1891 and was eventually named in honor of both presidents.

Elected in November 1898 as a member of the Fusion Party, Rendall served a single term (1899–1900) in the Pennsylvania House of Representatives representing Chester County. He lost his reelection campaign in 1900. A long-time member of the progressive wing of the Republican Party, he was a Bull Moose Party supporter during the early twentieth century.

Rendall served as a trustee of Wilson College, moderator of the Presbyterian Synod of Pennsylvania, delegate to the 1912 Republican National Convention, justice of the peace of Lower Oxford Township (where Lincoln University was located), and president of the Ministers' Social Union of Philadelphia and Vicinity in 1914–1915. Active in the Presbyterian General Assembly, he served as its national commissioner five times and twice was the runner-up candidate for national moderator.

== Personal life ==
Rendall married Harriet Elizabeth Jones (1845–1922) of Utica, New York, on July 12, 1872. They had four sons (all Princeton alumni and ministers) and one daughter: John B. Rendall Jr., U. W. Rendall, Humphrey J. Rendall, James H. Rendall, and Jane B. Rendall. Harriet died at the couple's home at Lincoln University in May 1922.

Rendall died after a long illness involving pernicious anemia on September 3, 1924, in Lower Oxford Township. His remains were interred at Oxford Cemetery.
