= Boyce Courtney Williams =

- Born: 1954 (age 71–72)
- Education: Lincoln University (Pennsylvania), Michigan State University
- Scientific career
- Fields: Professor, Psychologist

Boyce Courtney Williams (born 1954) is an educator and a visionary received national acclaim for her contributions to the field of education, specifically quality public and teacher education.

Williams holds a B.A. in English Education from Lincoln University (Pennsylvania). She received her M.A. in urban counseling and psychology and a Ph.D. in counseling psychology from Michigan State University. Most recently, she served as the project director for the Reading First Teacher Education Network, a $5 million grant from the U.S. Department of Education.

As vice president at the NCATE, she works closely with institutions to help implement the accreditation process smoothly and efficiently. Williams also served as project director of the HBCUs technical support.

She received several honorary Ph.Ds from various universities and colleges including Cheyney University of Pennsylvania, Virginia Union University, University of Arkansas, Stillman College, Lincoln University of Missouri and Lincoln University (Pennsylvania) (2009). In 2008, she was a featured speaker on the Tony Brown's Journal Syndicated Talk show.
