= William Hallock Johnson =

American educator and academic administrator (1865–1963)

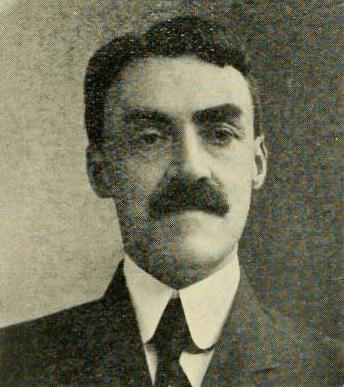
- Johnson in 1913

President of Lincoln University
- In office 1926–1936
- Preceded by: Walter Livingston Wright
- Succeeded by: Walter Livingston Wright

Personal details
- Born: December 3, 1865 New York City, US
- Died: November 29, 1963 (aged 97) West Chester, Pennsylvania
- Resting place: Princeton Cemetery, Princeton, New Jersey
- Education: Princeton University (AB, AM); Princeton Seminary (BD); Columbia University (PhD); Centre College (DD)
- Occupation: Educator, academic administrator

William Hallock Johnson (December 3, 1865 – November 29, 1963) was an American educator who served as president of the historically black Lincoln University of Pennsylvania from 1926 to 1936. He had a liberalizing effect on the institution, presiding over the appointment of its first Black faculty member, and substantially reduced the university's debt.

== Early life and education ==
Johnson was born in New York City on December 3, 1865, to John Edgar and Frances Elizabeth (Hallock) Johnson. His father was a banker. Johnson attended Dr. Chapin's Collegiate School in New York and received his Bachelor of Arts degree in 1888 from Princeton University, where he served on the board of the Princetonian (1884–1885) and as an editor of Nassau Literary Magazine (1887). He went on to receive his Master of Arts degree from Princeton in 1897, his Bachelor of Divinity degree from Princeton Theological Seminary in 1898, and his PhD in theology from Columbia University in 1902. Johnson spent a summer studying abroad in Germany at the University of Jena in 1904. He was ordained to the Presbyterian ministry in 1897.

Johnson taught at Union Theological Seminary in 1891, Princeton Theological Seminary from 1894 to 1897, and Danville Seminary (where he taught New Testament literature and exegesis) and Centre College of Kentucky (logic and psychology) from 1897 to 1901. From September 1903 he was Professor of Greek and New Testament Literature at Lincoln University, also serving as dean of the faculty for several years. In 1914, he received a doctorate of divinity from Centre College.

== Presidency ==
Johnson was appointed president by Lincoln's board of trustees on November 6, 1926, beginning his decade of service in the office on December 1, 1926. Johnson inherited an institution in financial and moral crisis. Amid crumbling finances and a deteriorating physical plant, Johnson also faced demands from Black alumni for a greater say in the running of the institution. Trustees refused to appoint a single Black alumnus to the board or professor to the faculty. Johnson intervened and the trustees finally appointed Eugene P. Roberts as Lincoln's first Black trustee in 1927. Two additional Black trustee appointments followed, along with the first appointment of a Black faculty member. Johnson also forced the retirement of four conservative long-time faculty members who had refused to support his administration's shift from racial paternalism.

Johnson liquidated debt and raised funds to pay for new buildings and campus improvements, including a new residence hall, gymnasium, power plant, water tower and fire protection system, and sewage treatment plant. Through fundraising and economies, he reduced Lincoln's debt from $197,000 to $74,000. He benefited from the support of former acting president and professor of mathematics Walter Livingston Wright, who succeeded Johnson as president in 1936 and continued his reforms.

== Later life and death ==
Designated president emeritus at Lincoln after retiring at the age of 70, Johnson served as a trustee of Lincoln University and Princeton Theological Seminary. He received an honorary doctorate of divinity from Princeton and became Princeton's oldest living alumnus in 1962. He moved to Princeton, New Jersey, after his retirement and then in July 1957 moved to the Fynmere United Presbyterian Home in Cooperstown, New York, where he lived for the rest of his life. He died while visiting the home of his son, Hallock S. Johnson, in West Chester, Pennsylvania, on November 29, 1963, at the age of 97. He was interred at Princeton Cemetery in Princeton, New Jersey.

On June 22, 1905, Johnson married Virginia Sherrard (1873–1950) in Chambersburg, Pennsylvania. The couple had two children: Hallock Sherrard (born 1906) and Roswell Park (born 1907). Johnson was fond of tennis and gardening. He never sought elected office but was accounted a progressive Republican.

== Publications ==
Johnson authored many books and papers on Christian theological topics such as free will. He also regularly contributed to The Princeton Theological Review.

- Johnson, William Hallock (1951). "Myth and Miracle at Mid-Century". Theology Today. 8 (3): 313–326. doi:10.1177/004057365100800305. ISSN 0040-5736. S2CID 170961625.
- Johnson, William Hallock (1949). "The Keystone of the Arch". Theology Today. 6 (1): 12–24. doi:10.1177/004057364900600104. ISSN 0040-5736. S2CID 170582540.
- Johnson, William Hallock (1946). "Princeton Seminary and Its Alumni". Journal of the Presbyterian Historical Society (1943-1961). 24 (2): 97–99. ISSN 0147-3735. JSTOR 23324071.
- Johnson, William Hallock (1940). Who Is This King of Glory?. New York: American Tract Society.
- Johnson, William Hallock (1919). "Is the Design Argument Dead?". The Harvard Theological Review. 12 (3): 315–328. doi:10.1017/S001781600001066X. ISSN 0017-8160. JSTOR 1507768. S2CID 163520542.
- Johnson, William Hallock (1916). The Christian Faith Under Modern Searchlights. New York: Fleming H. Revell Company.
- Johnson, William Hallock (1903). The Free-will Problem in Modern Thought. New York: Macmillan Company.
