= Rachel Creefield silhouette =

19th century hollow-cut silhouette

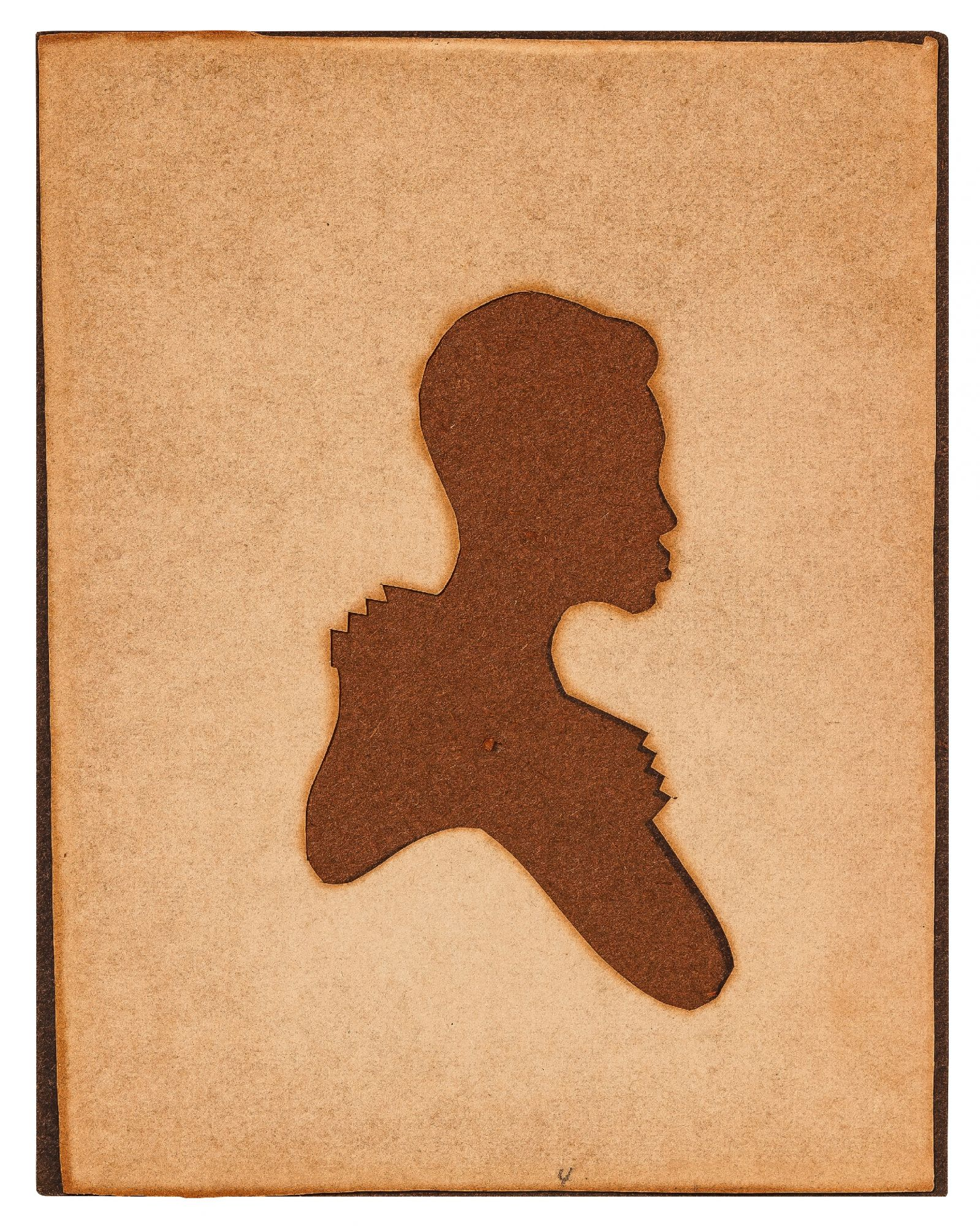
Silhouette of Rachel Creefield c.1825

The Rachel Creefield silhouette (c. 1825) is believed to be the earliest known hollow-cut silhouette of an African-American woman. It is held in the collection of the Smithsonian.

Rachel Creefield was employed by the Dickey family of Chester County, Pennsylvania. The silhouette is one of six likely created at the Peale Museum of family members of Creefield's employers, including John Miller Dickey. Creefield is believed to have been a domestic servant in the household of Ebenezer Dickey.

The silhouette is "cut from off-white wove paper and backed with black paper (with a positive image of the bust transferred in brown onto the backing sheet)." The work measures approximately 3.5 inches (8.9 cm) by 4.5 inches (11 cm).

== See also ==
- Moses Williams, a Black silhouette cutter whose own 1803 silhouette is the earliest known of an African-American
