= Joseph C. Price =

American religious minister and college president

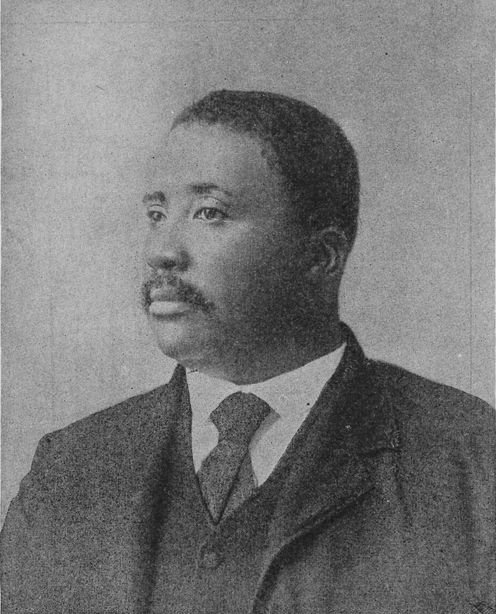
- Born: February 10, 1854; Elizabeth City, North Carolina
- Died: October 25, 1893 (aged 39); Salisbury, North Carolina
- Education: Lincoln University
- Occupations: educator, minister
- Political party: Republican

Religious life
- Religion: African Methodist Episcopal Zion

Joseph Charles Price (February 10, 1854 – October 25, 1893) was a founder and the first president of Livingstone College in Salisbury, North Carolina. He was one of the greatest orators of his day and a leader of African Americans in the southern United States. His death at the age of 39 cut short a career that might otherwise have vied with that of Booker T. Washington.

== Early life ==
Joseph Charles Price was born free in Elizabeth City, North Carolina on February 10, 1854, to a slave father and a free mother. His mother was named Emily Pailin, and his father was Charles Dozier, a ship's carpenter. Dozier was sold and sent to Baltimore, and Emily married a man named David Price, whose name Joseph took. When he was nine, he moved with his mother to New Bern, North Carolina, which had become a haven to free blacks after it was occupied by the Union Army during the American Civil War (1861-1865). That year he enrolled at St. Andrew's School, led by James Walker Hood, who would be an important influence on Price. He also attended St. Cyprian Episcopal School, which was known as the Lowell Normal School of New Bern and was run by the Boston Society.

== Early career ==
In 1871 he began his career as a teacher in the public school of Wilson, North Carolina. After four years he enrolled at Shaw University in Raleigh, North Carolina. At Shaw he converted the African Methodist Episcopal (AME) Church and was granted a license to preach. He then enrolled in Lincoln University in Oxford, Pennsylvania to study classics. He graduated valedictorian from the classical department at Lincoln in 1879 and from the theology department in 1881. In 1880 he was a delegate to the M.E. General Conference in Montgomery, Alabama, and in September 1881 was a delegate to the Ecumenical Conference in London, England. He remained in England for one year raising money for the Zion Wesley Institute which would be used to help build Livingstone College in Salisbury, North Carolina. Among his patrons back in the United States, particularly met during a fundraising tour of California, were businessman William E. Dodge, Alexander Walters, Senator Leland Stanford, Mark Hopkins Jr., Mrs. Pleasant, and Stephen V. White Price was then installed as president of the school and was professor of oratory, mental and moral science, and theology. He was also a noted figure in the 1881 North Carolina prohibition campaign.

== Later career ==
As president, he continued his work as a preacher. He preached from many different pulpits, and was the first black man to occupy the pulpit of Henry Ward Beecher and also took the pulpit of Rev Tamage. He was a delegate to the Centenary Conference of the ME Church in Baltimore in 1884 where he was one of three selected to give welcoming addresses along with Bishop James Osgood Andrew and Dr. John Berry McFerrin, and was chairman of the board of commissioners for Zion Church on forming a Union between the AME and the AME Zion church in Washington, DC in 1875. The failure of this program was one of the great disappointments of Price's life. In June 1887 he was given a Doctorate of Divinity by Lincoln University. In 1888, President Grover Cleveland asked Price to serve as minister to Liberia, but Price felt he could do more by staying at Livingstone. He was also at one point nominated for a bishopric, which he also declined.

In January 1890, Price was elected president of the Afro-American League at its founding convention in Chicago. He was elected chairman of the rival Equal Rights League in Washington, DC a month later. From July 10–12, 1890, the National Education Association annual meeting was held in Minneapolis, Minnesota. At that meeting, white southerner A. A. Gunby called for the exclusion of African Americans from the organization, threatening the founding of a separate, segregated association if his proposal was not accepted. Price was the primary opposing speaker, and his speech was extremely well received, and Price reported that even Gunby congratulated him for it.

He was active in local and state Republican politics and attended a number of local meetings and conventions, but advocated blacks to think more about education and business than politics. At his death in October 1893 he was president of the American Society for the Education of Colored Youths

== Personal life, death, and legacy ==
In the 1870s, Price married Jennie Smallwood of New Bern. The couple had known each other since childhood and had five children, William, Louise, Alma, Joseph, and Josie.

Price died at his home in Salisbury of Bright's disease on October 25, 1893. The Dictionary of North Carolina Biography reports that, "W. E. B. Du Bois, August Meier, and others felt that it was the leadership vacuum created by Price's death into which Booker T. Washington moved, and that had he lived, the influence and reputation of Price and of Livingstone College would have been as great or greater than that achieved by Washington and Tuskegee." At his passing George C. Rowe wrote a noted poem in his honor. Other noted tributes to him were published in the New York Independent and Christian Advocate, the Boston Journal of Education and elsewhere.

Price's oration was so renowned, he is considered one of the greatest voices of the nineteenth century, and the London Times called him "The World's Orator". He was voted as one of the "ten greatest negroes" of the year in the September 20, 1890 edition of the Indianapolis Freeman.

== Sources ==
- Chesnutt, Charles W. "Joseph C. Price, Orator and Educator", in McElrath Jr, Joseph R., Robert C. Leitz, and Jesse S. Crisler. Charles W. Chesnutt: Essays and Speeches. Stanford University Press, 2001.
- Walls, William Jacob. Joseph Charles Price, Educator and Race Leader: Educator and Race Leader. The Christopher Publishing House, 1943.
