= Vergel L. Lattimore =

United States Air Force general

Vergel L. Lattimore is a retired brigadier general in the United States Air National Guard.

== Biography ==
An ordained African Methodist Episcopal Zion minister, Lattimore is President and Professor of Pastoral Psychology at Hood Theological Seminary. He is professor emeritus of Pastoral Care and Counseling at the Methodist Theological School in Ohio. He has attended Livingstone College, Duke Divinity School, Northwestern University and Hartford Seminary. He is married to Joy and they have three children, Vergel IV; Adam and Alia. He is the current President of Hood Theological Seminary in Salisbury, NC.

== Military career ==
Lattimore joined the U.S. Air Force Reserve in 1979. He later became Air National Guard Assistant to the Command Chaplain at Headquarters Air Combat Command. In 2003, he became Air National Guard Assistant to the Chief of Chaplains of the United States Air Force.

Awards he has received include the Air Force Commendation Medal, the Outstanding Unit Award with valor device, the Air Force Longevity Service Award and the Air Force Training Ribbon.
