= Isaac Norton Rendall =

American minister and college administrator (1825–1912)

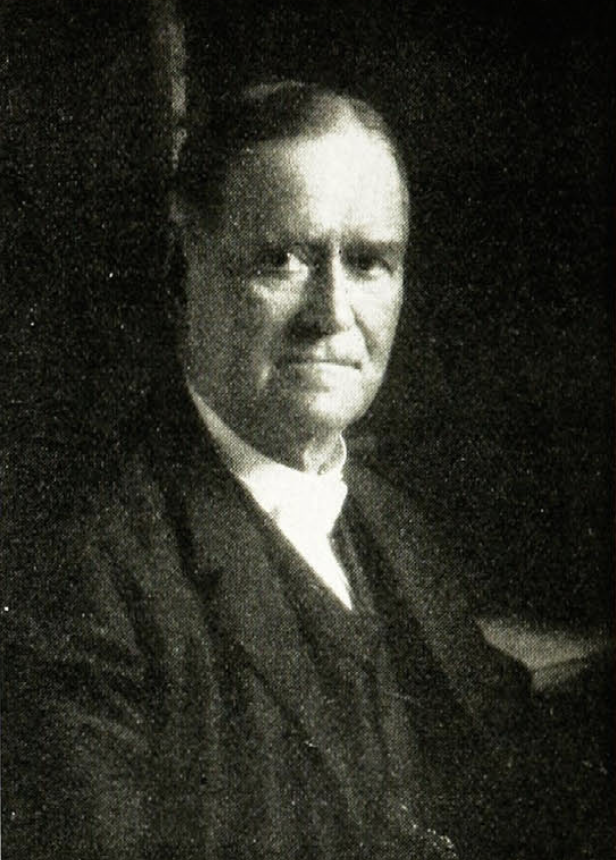

President of Lincoln University
- In office 1865–1906
- Preceded by: John Wynne Martin
- Succeeded by: John Ballard Rendall

Personal details
- Born: September 30, 1825 Utica, New York, US
- Died: November 15, 1912 (aged 87) Oxford, Pennsylvania, U.S.
- Education: Princeton Theological Seminary
- Profession: Minister, educator

Isaac Norton Rendall (September 30, 1825 – November 15, 1912) was an American Presbyterian minister and academic administrator. He served as president of Lincoln University for forty-one years (1865–1906).

== Early life and education ==
Isaac Norton Rendall was born in Utica, New York, on September 30, 1825. He had five siblings. He graduated from Princeton University in 1852 and from Princeton Theological Seminary in 1855 and received his ordination as a Presbyterian minister in 1860. He subsequently received a doctorate of divinity from Lafayette College in 1870. He served as stated supply first of the church of Oneida Valley, New York, from 1858 to 1864 and of the church of Emporium, Pennsylvania, from 1864 to 1865.

== Lincoln University presidency ==
Rendall became president of the Ashmun Institute, later renamed Lincoln University after the assassination of Abraham Lincoln, in 1865. He lived on campus at the University. Upon retirement in 1906, he was the longest serving university president in the world, having served for forty-one years. Lincoln University had also become one of the wealthiest colleges in the country. Over the decades, he had rejected four petitions from Philadelphia's free Black community to hire qualified African American faculty. Following his retirement, he continued to live on campus and teach evangelism and polemics at the school.

== Later life and legacy ==
Rendall never married. In late October 1912, he became sick and died on November 15, 1912, at his home on the campus of Lincoln University. He is buried at Oxford Cemetery in Oxford, Pennsylvania. In the week subsequent to his death, the Public Opinion called him a "friend of negro[es]" in an obituary due to his work at Lincoln University.

=== Legacy ===
Rendall Hall at Lincoln University is named for him and his nephew John Ballard Rendall, who also served as president of the university. His records are held in the Cooperative HBCU Archival Survey Project, including a book he wrote about Lincoln University.
