= Walter Livingston Wright =

American educator and president of Lincoln University from 1936 to 1945

7th President of Lincoln University
- In office 1936 – October 1945
- Preceded by: William Hallock Johnson
- Succeeded by: Horace Mann Bond

Personal details
- Born: February 3, 1872 Juliustown, New Jersey, US
- Died: January 17, 1946 (aged 73) Oxford, Pennsylvania, US
- Occupation: Professor of mathematics, academic administrator

Walter Livingston Wright (February 3, 1872 – January 17, 1946) was an American educator and academic administrator who served as president of Lincoln University from 1936 to 1945. He had been a professor of mathematics at Lincoln since 1893 and served as acting president from 1924 to 1926. His successor was Lincoln's first Black president, Horace Mann Bond.

== Life and career ==
Wright was born in the Juliustown section of Springfield Township, Burlington County, New Jersey, to parents Walter L. and Elizabeth Gaskill Wright. He received his BA degree in 1892 and his MA in physics in 1895, both from Princeton University. During World War I, he participated in YMCA educational work in Brest, France. He taught mathematics at Lincoln University from 1893 to 1936 and served as vice president from 1926 to 1936. He received an LLD from Lincoln in 1933. He was a member of the Mathematical Association of America.

All three of his children went on to academic careers. Walter Livingston Wright Jr. (1900–1949) served as professor of Turkish language and history at Princeton University and served as president of Robert College and the Istanbul Woman's College in Istanbul, Turkey. His younger son, George Carr, taught modern languages at Lincoln, and his daughter, Jean Gray Wright, taught at the University of Richmond. All three children survived their father. His first wife, Jean Carr Wright, died in 1925. He remarried in 1942 to Jean's recently widowed sister Mary Jameson Christie Carr and she is the wife who survived him.

Wright died of a heart attack at his home on Lincoln's campus at the age of 73.
