= Lincoln University, Pennsylvania (CDP) =

Coordinates: 39.803472°N 75.925525°W

Lincoln University
- CDP
- Location in Chester County and the state of Pennsylvania.
- Country: United States
- State: Pennsylvania
- County: Chester
- Township: Lower Oxford Township

Area
  - Total: 0.29 sq mi (0.74 km^{2})
  - Land: 0.29 sq mi (0.74 km^{2})
  - Water: 0 sq mi (0.00 km^{2})

Population (2020)
  - Total: 1,739
  - Density: 6,090.6/sq mi (2,351.61/km^{2})
- Time zone: UTC-5 (Eastern (EST))
  - Summer (DST): UTC-4 (EDT)
- FIPS code: 42-43544

Lincoln University is a census-designated place (CDP) in Lower Oxford Township, Pennsylvania, United States. It is located just off campus to Lincoln University, approximately four miles (6.4 km) northeast of the borough of Oxford. The CDP is located near U.S. Route 1. As of the 2010 census, the population was 1,726 residents.

== Demographics ==
Historical population
Census	Pop.	Note	%±
2020	1,739		—
U.S. Decennial Census
