= Brenda A. Allen =

American psychologist and president of Lincoln University

Brenda Allen
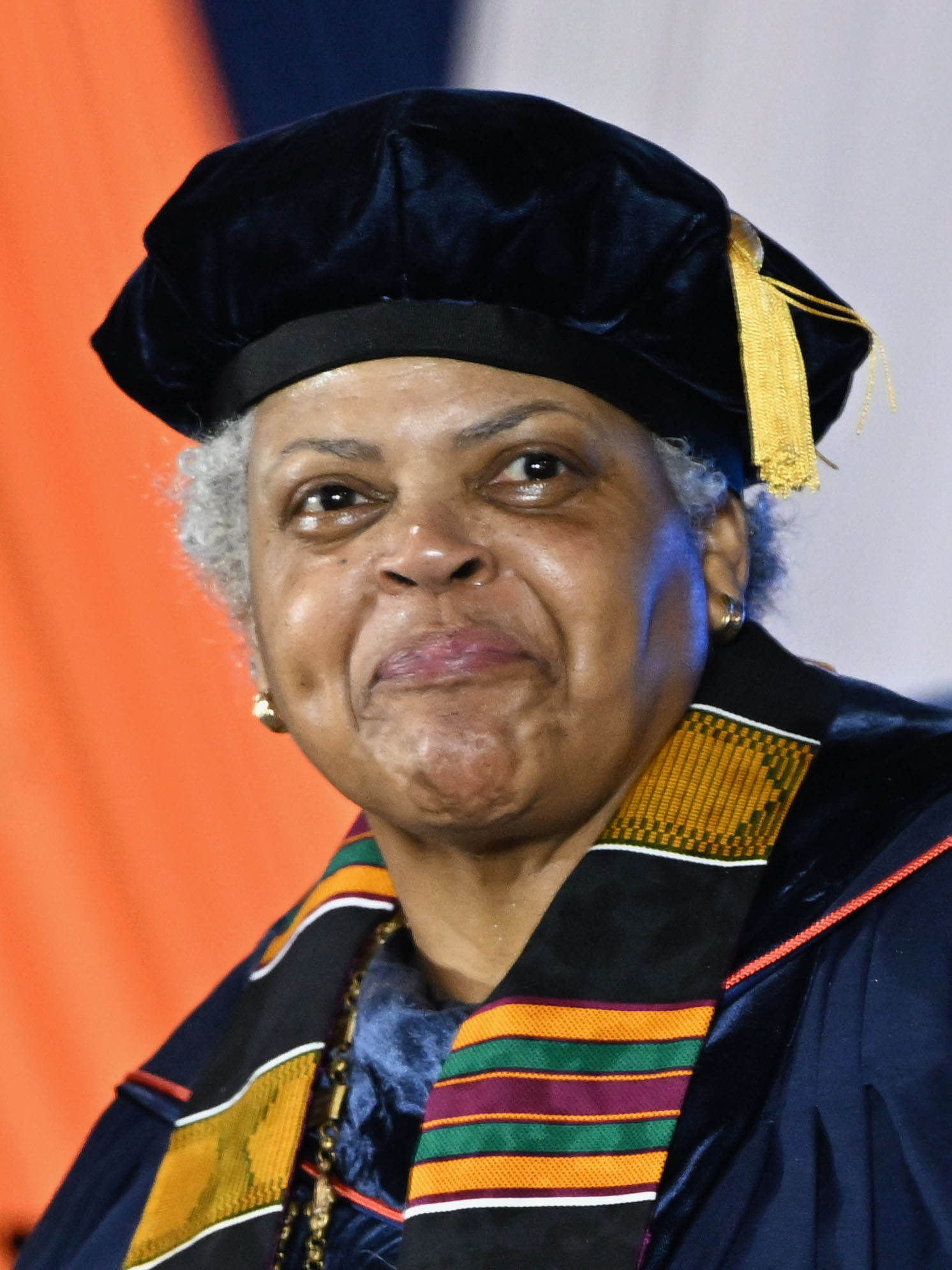
- Allen in 2025

14th President of Lincoln University
- Incumbent
- Assumed office July 1, 2017
- Preceded by: Robert R. Jennings

Personal details
- Born: Newark, New Jersey, U.S.
- Education: Lincoln University (BA); Howard University (MS, PhD)

Brenda A. Allen is an American psychologist, educator, and academic administrator who has served as the 14th president of Lincoln University, a historically black university in Lower Oxford, Pennsylvania, since July 2017. She is the second woman to serve as Lincoln University's president after Niara Sudarkasa. Allen has prioritized strengthening Lincoln's academic quality and campus infrastructure.

== Education and career ==
Born in Newark, New Jersey, Allen graduated from Lincoln University (BA 1981) and Howard University (MS 1984, PhD 1988) with three degrees in cognitive and developmental psychology and held a postdoctoral appointment at Yale University, where she taught classes and researched the interactions between ethnicity and student achievement, especially for African American children.

After three years at Yale, Allen went to earn tenure and chair the African American Studies department at Smith College before becoming associate provost and director of institutional diversity at Brown University from 2003 to 2009 and provost and vice chancellor for academic affairs at Winston-Salem State University from 2009 to 2017. At Winston-Salem, she established the university's first doctoral programs, bolstered student retention and graduation, and helped raise $10 million in donations.

== Lincoln University presidency ==
Allen was named as Lincoln University's 14th president in May 2017, assumed office on July 1, and was inaugurated in a ceremony at the university's Chester County campus on October 20 of that year. By 2020, she had improved retention rates, nearly doubled the number of individual donors, and increased alumni giving by 34%. She campaigned to improve Lincoln's technology, student support services, and residence halls. In December 2020, billionaire MacKenzie Scott donated $20 million to Lincoln (the second largest single gift in the university's history), and Brooklyn Nets guard Kyrie Irving paid the tuition costs of nine graduating seniors.

On July 10, 2020, in a closed-door virtual meeting that some board members could not attend because of technical or financial difficulties, Lincoln's board of trustees refused to renew Allen's contract. The trustees offered no explanation either to the president or the public. According to The Philadelphia Inquirer, "The vote drew anger from the 250-person audience on an adjacent Zoom call, as well as the larger community, much of which had rallied behind Allen, a Lincoln alumna who had become the school's 14th president in 2017." Allen sued for breach of contract and violation of Pennsylvania's sunshine laws as well as the university's bylaws, which mandated a public vote. Pennsylvania Attorney General Josh Shapiro and Governor Tom Wolf backed the president and also filed suit against the board. Lincoln's student government association and many alumni rallied to her support, launching a petition that had garnered more than 14,500 signatures even before her ouster. On July 24, Chester County Judge William P. Mahon ordered Allen to be reinstated. On August 6, the board of trustees voted to negotiate a new contract with Allen, and on September 19, the board of trustees unanimously voted to approve a new contract granting her another five-year term as president.

In October 2020, The Philadelphia Tribune named her as one of Philadelphia's most influential African American leaders. In January 2021, the HBCU Campaign Fund declared her to be one of ten "most dominant" HBCU leaders of the year.
