= Joseph Newman Clinton =

American politician (1854–1927)

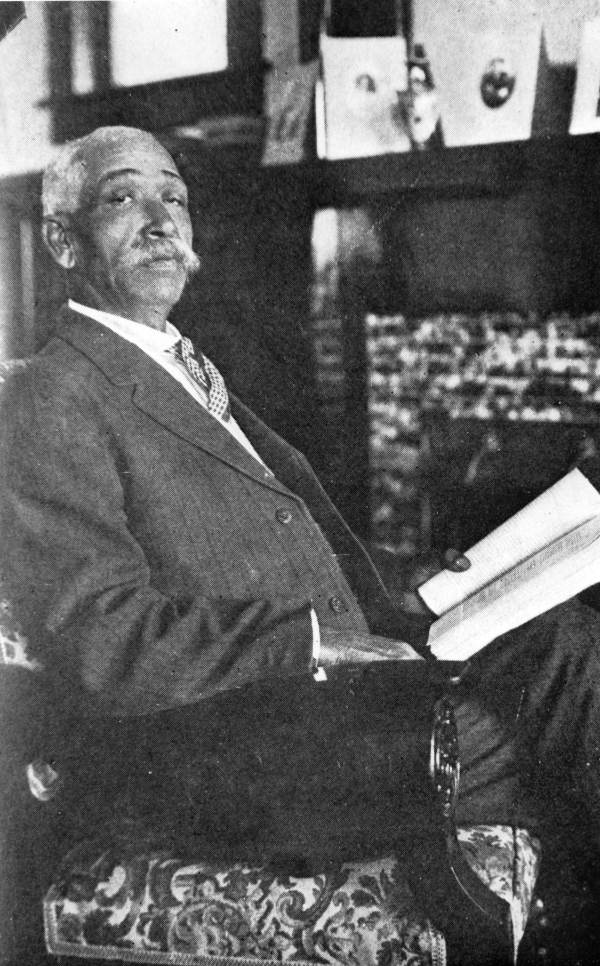

Member of the Florida House of Representatives from the Alachua County district
- In office 1881–1883

Personal details
- Born: November 19, 1854 Pittsburgh, Pennsylvania, U.S.
- Died: 1927 (aged 72–73)
- Party: Republican
- Spouse: Agnes Stewart (m. 1882)
- Education: Institute for Colored Youth; Lincoln University

Joseph Newman Clinton (November 19, 1854 – 1927) was a politician and public official in Florida. An African American, he served in the Florida House of Representatives from Alachua County from 1881 to 1883, was a member of the city council in Gainesville from 1883 to 1885, and was a federal official in Pensacola and Tampa.

He was born in Pittsburgh, Pennsylvania, the son of an African Methodist Episcopal Church bishop. He went to high school at the Institute for Colored Youth and graduated from Lincoln University in 1873. He began his career as a teacher. He married Agnes Stewart of Atlantic City in 1882.

For 14 years he served as internal revenue collector in Tampa. In 1913, Woodrow Wilson removed African Americans in the South from federal offices.

== See also ==
- African American officeholders from the end of the Civil War until before 1900
