= James A. Donaldson =

American mathematician (1941–2019)

James Ashley Donaldson
- Born: April 17, 1941
- Died: October 18, 2019 (aged 78); Washington D.C.
- Education: Lincoln University (AB); University of Illinois at Urbana-Champaign (MS, PhD)
- Scientific career
- Fields: Mathematics
- Workplaces: Howard University

James Ashley Donaldson (April 17, 1941 — October 18, 2019) was an American mathematician. He was a professor at Howard University, where he was instrumental in establishing a PhD program in mathematics. He also helped found the National Association of Mathematicians.

== Education and career ==
Donaldson was born in on April 17, 1941, on a farm near Tallahassee, Florida, where he grew up attending segregated schools. In the wake of Brown v. Board of Education, he took the advice of his high school mathematics teacher to attend college in the northern United States, where he attended Lincoln University in Pennsylvania. After graduating from Lincoln with a AB in mathematics in 1961, he moved to the University of Illinois at Urbana–Champaign for his graduate work, where he completed an MS degree in 1963, and a PhD in 1965. His PhD thesis on partial differential equations was titled Integral Representations of the Extended Airy Integral Type for the Modified Bessel Function, and was supervised by Ray Gartner Langebartel.

Following his PhD, Donaldson had short term appointments at Southern University, Howard University, the University of Illinois at Chicago, and the University of New Mexico. He returned to Howard University in 1971 as a professor, where he remained for most of the rest of his career. He served as chair of the mathematics department at Howard from 1972 until 1990, in which role he was instrumental in developing a PhD program in mathematics. Howard's program, established in 1976, was the first PhD program in mathematics at a historically black college or university. In the 1998—1999 school year, Donaldson took a leave of absence from Howard to serve as the acting president of Lincoln University, his undergraduate alma mater. He returned to Howard in 1999, and from that year until 2012 he served as dean of the College of Arts and Sciences. Donaldson retired and was granted emeritus status in 2013.

== Organizational work ==
In 1969, Donaldson was one of the founding members of the National Association of Mathematicians, the professional society promoting mathematical development of underrepresented minorities. He served as the first editor of the newsletter of that organization, and was a member of its board of directors from 1984 to 1994.

== Death ==
Donaldson died of heart disease on October 18, 2019, at his home in Washington, D.C.

== Awards and honors ==
In 2018, Donaldson received an honorary doctoral degree from his former undergraduate institution, Lincoln University. In 2021, a Special Session in Donaldson's honor was held at the Joint Mathematics Meetings.
