= Lincoln University (Pennsylvania) =

Historically black university in Lower Oxford Township, Pennsylvania, US

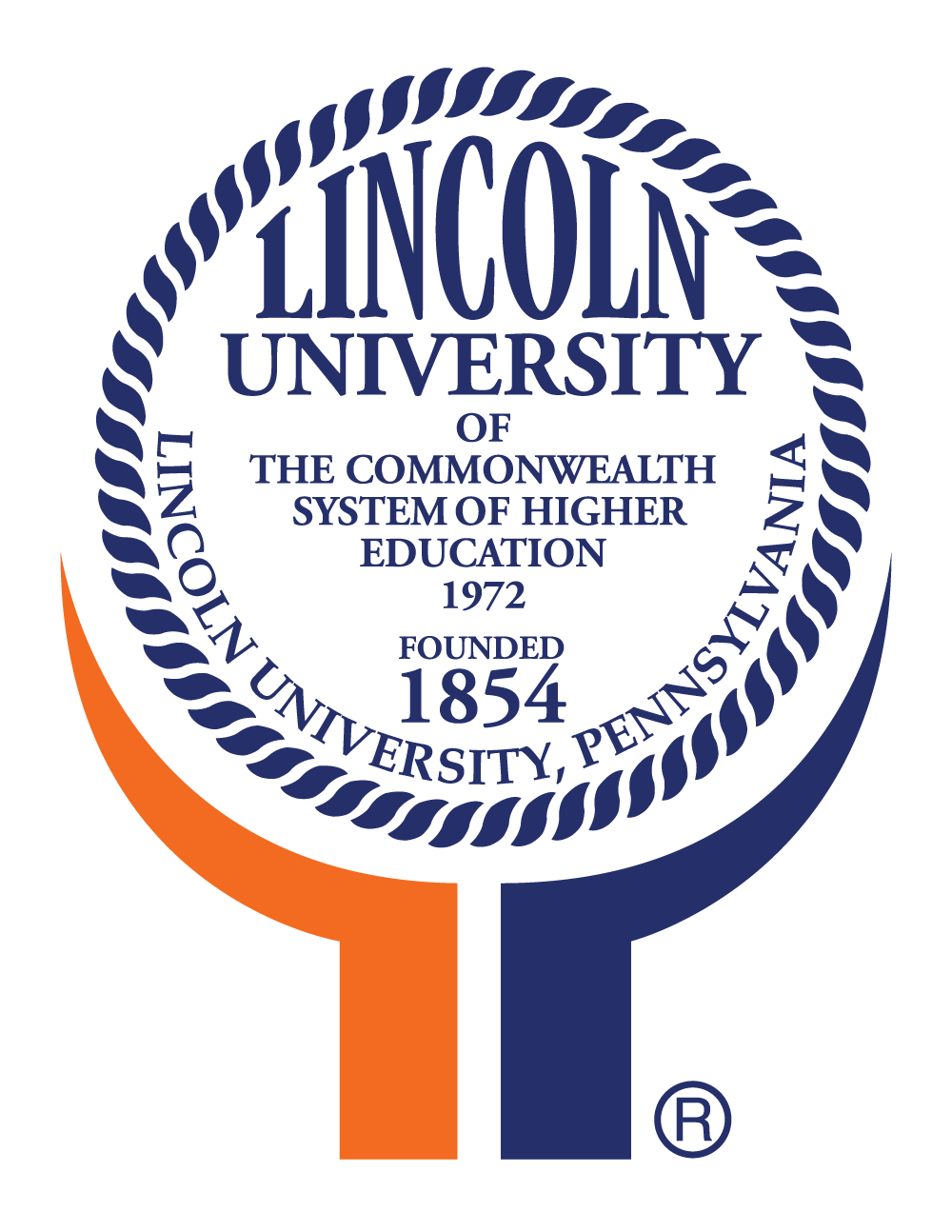
- Former name: Ashmun Institute (1854–1866)
- Motto: "If the Son shall make you free, ye shall be free indeed"
- Type: Public state-related historically black university
- Established: April 29, 1854; 172 years ago
- Accreditation: MSCHE
- Academic affiliations: TMCF; Space-grant
- President: Brenda A. Allen
- Provost: Patricia A. Joseph
- Students: 1,527 (Fall 2025)
- Undergraduates: 1,424
- Postgraduates: 103
- Location: Lower Oxford Township, Pennsylvania, U.S. 39°48′30″N 75°55′40″W
- Campus: 422 acres (170.8 ha); Large suburb
- Newspaper: The Lincolnian
- Other campuses: Philadelphia
- Colors: Orange and blue
- Nickname: Lions
- Sporting affiliations: NCAA Division II – CIAA; ECAC; CACC
- Mascot: Luther the Lincoln Lion
- Website: lincoln.edu
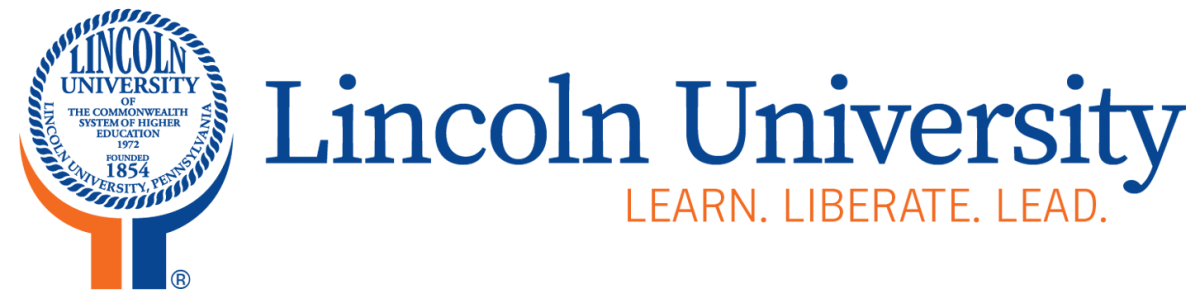

Pennsylvania Historical Marker
- Designated: January 25, 1967

Lincoln University (LU) is a public state-related historically black university (HBCU) in Lower Oxford Township, Pennsylvania, United States. Founded as the private Ashmun Institute in 1854, it has been a public institution since 1972. Lincoln is also recognized as the first college-degree-granting HBCU in the country. Its main campus is located on 422 acres (170.8 ha) in southern Chester County, Pennsylvania. The university has a second location in University City, Philadelphia. Lincoln University provides undergraduate and graduate coursework to approximately 2,000 students. It is a member-school of the Thurgood Marshall College Fund.

While a majority of its students are African Americans, the university has a long history of accepting students of other races and nationalities. Women have received degrees since 1953, and made up 66% of undergraduate enrollment in 2019.

== History ==
In 1854, John Miller Dickey, a Presbyterian minister, and his wife, Sarah Emlen Cresson, a Quaker, founded Ashmun Institute, later named Lincoln University, in Hinsonville, Pennsylvania. They named it after Jehudi Ashmun, a religious leader and social reformer. They founded the school for the education of African Americans, who had few opportunities for higher education.

Presidents
John Miller Dickey (Note: Founder and President of the Board of Trustees, Ashmun Institute and Lincoln University)	1854–1856
John Pym Carter	1856–1861
John Wynne Martin	1861–1865
Isaac Norton Rendall	1865–1906
John Ballard Rendall	1906–1924
Walter Livingston Wright*	1924–1926
William Hallock Johnson	1926–1936
Walter Livingston Wright	1936–1945
Horace Mann Bond (Note: First alumni president and first Black president)	1945–1957
Armstead Otey Grubb*	1957–1960
Donald Charles Yelton*	1960–1961
Marvin Wachman	1961–1969
Bernard Warren Harleston*	1970-1970
Herman Russell Branson	1970–1985
Donald Leopold Mullett*	1985–1987
Niara Sudarkasa	1987–1998
James A. Donaldson*	1998–1999
Ivory V. Nelson	1999–2011
Robert R. Jennings	2011–2014
Valerie I. Harrison*	2014–2015
Richard Green**	2015–2017
Brenda A. Allen	2017–
* Acting president ** Interim president

John Miller Dickey was the first president of the college. He encouraged some of his first students, James Ralston Amos (1826–1864), his brother Thomas Henry Amos (1825–1869), and Armistead Hutchinson Miller (1829/30–1865), to support the establishment of Liberia as a colony for African Americans. Each of the men became an ordained minister.

In 1866, a year after the assassination of President Abraham Lincoln, Ashmun Institute was renamed Lincoln University. The college attracted highly talented students from numerous states, especially during the decades of legal segregation in the American South. Many alumni furthered their careers in academia, public service, and the arts. President William Howard Taft gave the commencement address at Lincoln in 1910.

In June 1921, days after the Tulsa race massacre, President Warren Harding visited Lincoln to deliver the commencement address. He spoke about the need to seek healing and harmony in that incident's aftermath, as well as to honor Lincoln alumni who were among the 367,000 African-American servicemen who fought in World War I. The school newspaper noted Harding's visit as "the high water mark in the history of the institution."

In 1945 Horace Mann Bond, an alumnus of Lincoln, became the first African-American president of the university. He served for twelve years. In 1946, in spite of then prevailing racial dynamics, Albert Einstein visited the university to give a lecture on Physics and also spoke on racism. This was depicted in a 2017 episode of Genius (American TV series), which dramatizes Einstein's life.

From 1854 to 1954, Lincoln University graduates accounted for 20% of African American physicians and over 10% of African American lawyers in the United States.

The university marked its hundredth anniversary by amending its charter in 1953 to permit the granting of degrees to women. True coeducation was slow to arrive, however, and women still constituted only 5% of the student body in 1964. In 1972 Lincoln University formally associated with the Commonwealth of Pennsylvania as a state-related institution.

In 1987, Niara Sudarkasa became the first woman and first African-American woman appointed president of the university.

Ivory V. Nelson was selected by the board of trustees as the twelfth president of Lincoln University in 1999. He served as president from August 15, 1999, to November 2011, when he retired. During his tenure, Lincoln University increased student enrollment, paid off its $15 million debt, eliminated operating deficits, and secured $325 million in public and private funding for the construction and renovation of campus infrastructure. The Ivory V. Nelson Science Center, which opened in the fall of 2009 on Lincoln's campus, was named in his honor, and houses Lincoln's mathematics, computer science, biology, chemistry, and physics departments.

In November 2014, university president Robert R. Jennings resigned under pressure from faculty, students and alumni after comments relating to issues of sexual assault. Jennings was also the subject of a couple of no-confidence votes by faculty and the alumni association in October 2014.

In 2017, Brenda A. Allen became Lincoln's new president. She graduated from Lincoln in 1981. In 2020, MacKenzie Scott donated $20 million to Lincoln University which is the second largest single gift in Lincoln's history.

On October 25, 2025, a shooting at the university during homecoming weekend killed one person and injured six others. it is believed that there were multiple shooters. One man was arrested and charged, with bail being set at $1 million.

In December 2025, MacKenzie Scott donated an additional $25 million, which is the largest single gift in Lincoln's history.

== Campus ==
ALMA MATER

Dear Lincoln, Dear Lincoln,
To thee we'll e'er be true.
The golden hours we spent beneath
The dear old Orange and Blue,
Will live for e'er in memory,
As guiding stars through life;
For thee, our Alma Mater dear,
We will rise in our might.

For thee, our Alma Mater dear,
We will rise in our might.

For we love ev'ry inch of thy sacred soil,
Ev'ry tree on thy campus green;
And for thee with our might
We will ever toil
That thou mightiest be supreme.
We'll raise thy standard to the sky,
Midst glory and honor to fly.
And constant and true
We will live for thee anew,
Our dear old Orange and Blue.
Hail! Hail! Lincoln.

— A. Dennee Bibb, 1911

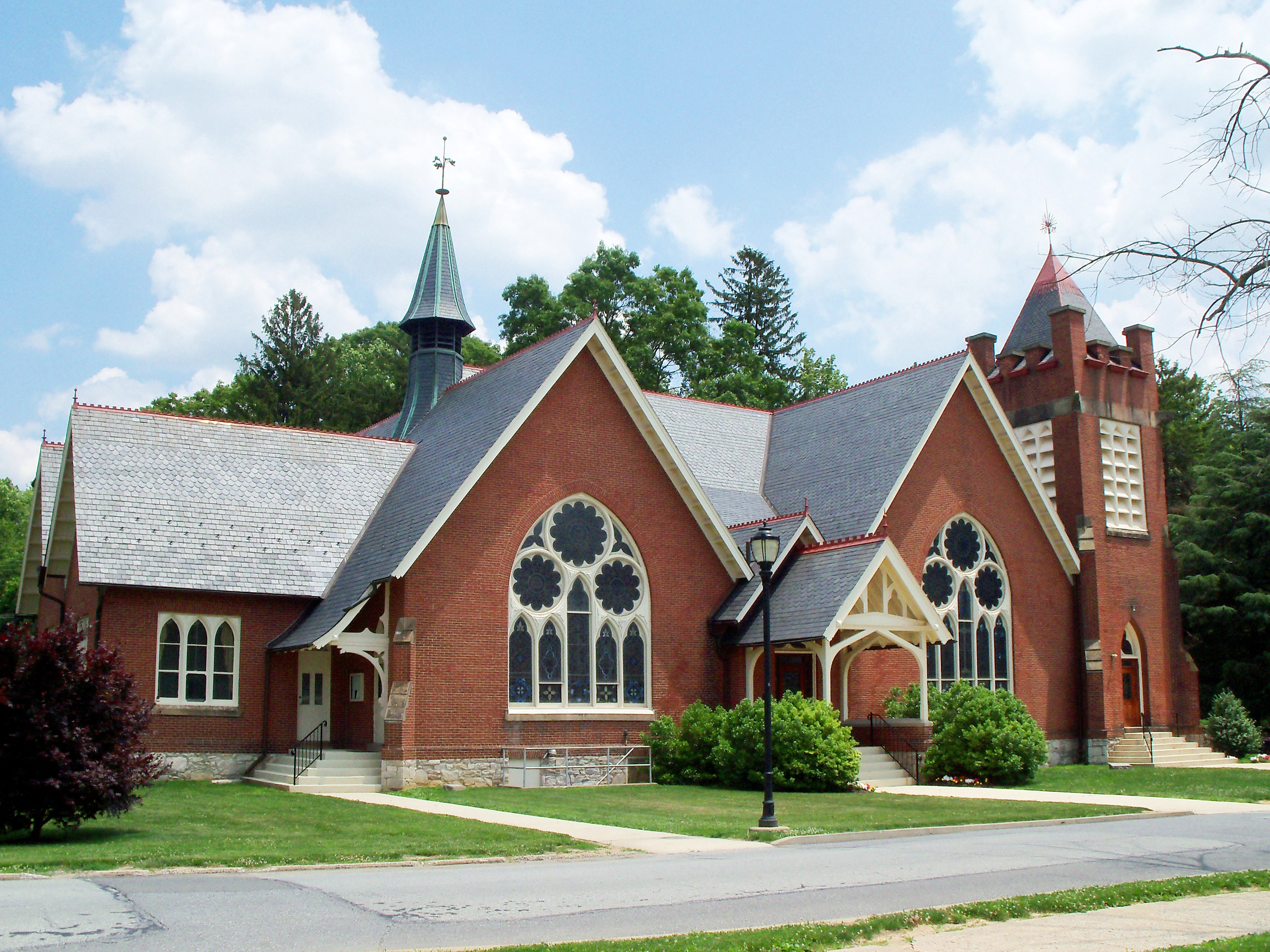
Brown Memorial Chapel

Lincoln University main campus is 422 acres (170.8 ha) with 56 buildings totaling over one million gross square feet. It is a census-designated place (CDP) for statistical purposes. As of the 2010 census, the Lincoln University CDP had a resident population of 1,726.

There are fifteen residence halls that accommodate over 1,600 students. The residence halls range from small dorms such as Alumni Hall, built in 1870; and Amos Hall, built in 1902, to the new coed 400-bed apartment-style living (ASL) suites built in 2005. There are additional off-campus housing arrangements such as Thorn Flats, in Newark, Delaware. The campus was listed on the National Register of Historic Places in 2022.

The four-story, 150,000-square-foot (14,000 m^{2}) Ivory V. Nelson Science Center and General Classroom High Technology Building was completed in 2008. The 60,000-square-foot (5,600 m^{2}) International Cultural Center was completed in 2010. The Health and Wellness Center is a 105,000 square feet (9,800 m^{2}) facility that opened in 2012. There is also a football stadium on campus. One of the most visible landmarks on campus is the Alumni Memorial Arch, located at the entrance to the university. The arch was dedicated by President Warren G. Harding in 1921, to honor the Lincoln men who served in World War I.

The Langston Hughes Memorial Library (LHML): Vail Memorial Library served as the first physical library building on the Lincoln University campus. Its collection outgrew the building's capacity after notable 1929 alumnus and renowned poet, James Mercer Langston Hughes, bequeathed the contents of his personal library to the university upon his death in 1967. Construction of a larger building was underway in 1970. The new Langston Hughes Memorial Library (LHML) opened in 1972. Holdings include over 185,000 volumes as well as databases containing in excess of 30,000 journal titles, periodicals, eBooks, and media offerings.

The completely renovated Student Union Building contains the bookstore, café, two television studios, and a radio studio, postal services, and multipurpose rooms. The Thurgood Marshall Living Learning Center, along with the Student Union Building, are the centers for campus social and meeting activities. Marshall graduated in the class of 1930, directed the NAACP's Legal Defense Fund in groundbreaking cases, and was the first African American to be appointed as a justice to US Supreme Court.

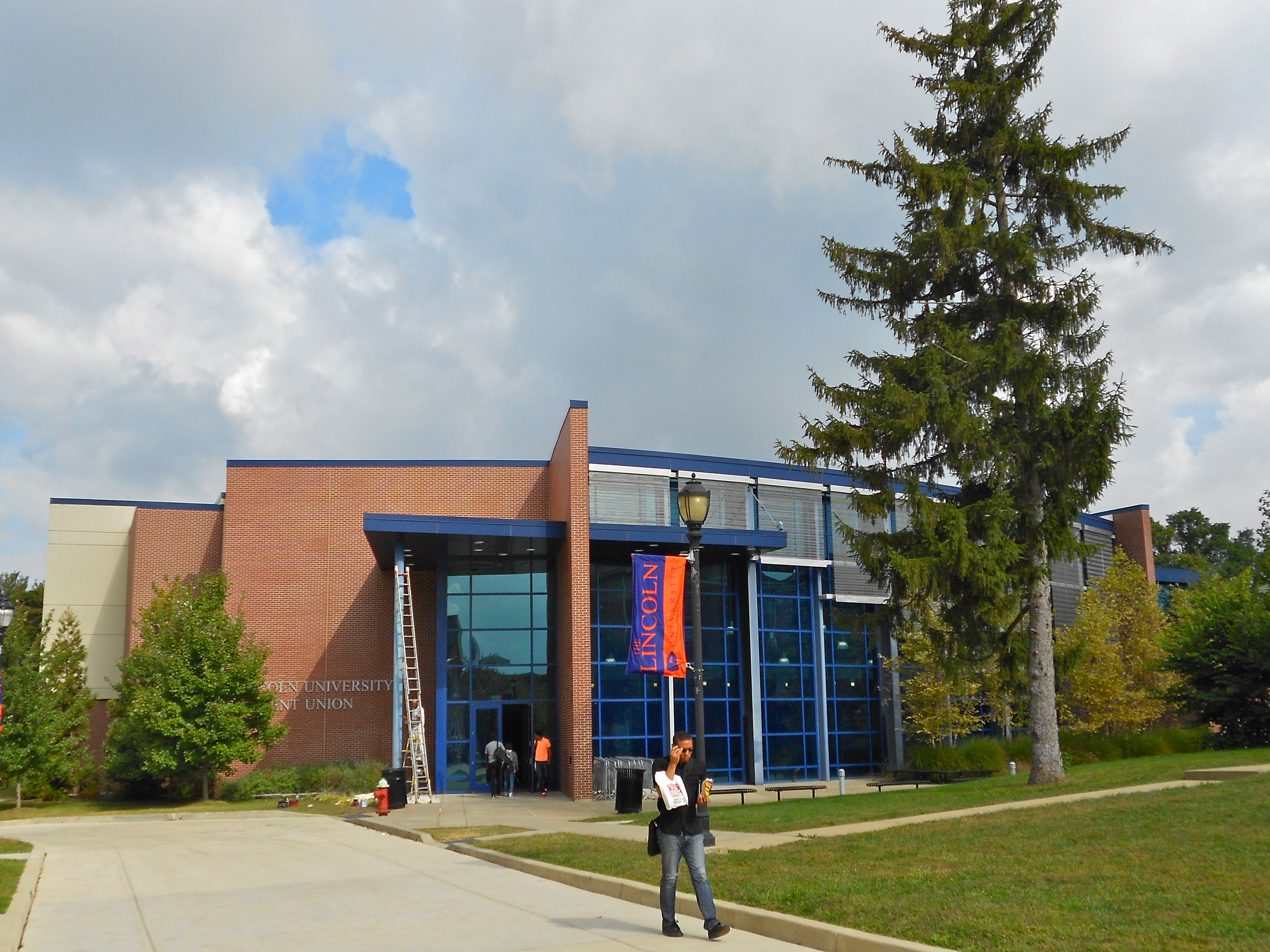
The Student Union Building (SUB)

=== Philadelphia campus ===
Lincoln University—University City, a six-story building in the University City section of Philadelphia, offers select undergraduate and graduate programs in the School of Adult & Continuing Education.

== Academics ==
According to U.S. News & World Report, Lincoln University ranked number 19 in the 2020 magazine's ranking of HBCUs. In 2020 the US News & World Best Colleges Report rated Lincoln 119 among Regional Universities North.

The Lincoln-Barnes Visual Arts program is a collaboration between Lincoln University and the Barnes Foundation. It established a Visual Arts program that leads to a Bachelor of Fine Arts, and most recently, a Pan-Africana Studies major has been added to the list undergraduate majors available at the institution.

== Student life ==
Undergraduate demographics as of Fall 2023
Race and ethnicity	Total
Black	83%
Hispanic	6%
Two or more races	4%
International student	3%
Unknown	2%
White	1%
Economic diversity
Low-income (Note: The percentage of students who received an income-based federal Pell grant intended for low-income students.)	67%
Affluent (Note: The percentage of students who are a part of the American middle class at the bare minimum.)	33%

Lincoln has over 60 student organizations serving multiple interests including fashion, arts, social justice, religious, international, cultural, service, leisure, media, and publishing. There are numerous fraternities and sororities.

=== Student publications, radio, and television ===
- Newspaper: The Lincolnian
- Yearbook: The Lion
- Campus radio station: WWLU
- Campus television station: LUC-TV

== Athletics ==
Lincoln University participates in the NCAA as a Division II institution. Lincoln competes as a Division II member of the Central Intercollegiate Athletic Association and, the Eastern College Athletic Conference. Lincoln Lions compete in intercollegiate athletics in the following sports: baseball, soccer (women), basketball (men and women), volleyball (women), indoor track (men and women), outdoor track (men and women), cross-country (men and women), softball, and football.

== The Barnes Foundation ==
As president of Lincoln University (1945–1957), Horace Mann Bond formed a friendship with Albert C. Barnes, philanthropist and art collector who established the Barnes Foundation. Barnes took a special interest in the institution and built a relationship with its students. Barnes gave Lincoln University the privilege of naming four of the five directors originally set as the number for the governing board of the Barnes Foundation.

Barnes had an interest in helping under-served youth and populations. Barnes intended his $25 billion art collection to be used primarily as a teaching resource. He limited the number of people who could view it, and for years even the kinds of people, with a preference for students and working class. Visitors still must make appointments in advance to see the collection, and only a limited number are allowed in the galleries at one time.

In the mid-20th century, local government restricted traffic to the campus, then located in a residential neighborhood at 300 North Latch's Lane, Merion, Pennsylvania. Barnes' constraints, local factors, and management issues pushed the foundation near bankruptcy by the 1990s. Supporters began to explore plans to move the collection to a more public location and maintain it to museum standards. To raise money for needed renovations to the main building to protect the collection, the foundation sent some of the most famous impressionist and modern paintings on tour.

In 2002, the Attorney General of Pennsylvania D. Michael Fisher contested Albert C. Barnes' will, arguing that the Merion location of the collection and small number of board members limited the foundation's ability to sustain itself financially. Pennsylvania Governor Edward Rendell brokered a settlement in 2005 between the Barnes Foundation and Lincoln University. This agreement resulted in the number of directors increasing. This has diluted Lincoln's influence over the collection, valued as of 2009 at approximately twenty-five billion dollars.

A documentary named The Art of the Steal depicts the events.

== Alumni ==
Lincoln University has numerous notable alumni, including US Supreme Court Justice Thurgood Marshall; Harlem Renaissance poet Langston Hughes; Medal of Honor recipient and pioneering African-American editor Christian Fleetwood; former US Ambassador to Botswana, Horace Dawson; civil rights activist Frederick D. Alexander; the first president of Nigeria, Nnamdi Azikiwe; the first president of Ghana, Kwame Nkrumah; song artist and activist Gil Scott-Heron; Emmy Award-winning and Tony Award-nominated actor Roscoe Lee Browne; Robert Walter Johnson, tennis coach of Althea Gibson and Arthur Ashe; Melvin B. Tolson, teacher and coach of the Wiley College, Marshall, Texas, debate team portrayed in the film The Great Debaters; Sheila Oliver, lieutenant governor of New Jersey; Joseph Newman Clinton, member of the Florida House of Representatives; Luis Ernesto Ramos Yordán of the House of Representatives for Puerto Rico; and politician, Baptist minister, radio host, author, and activist Conrad Tillard.

Offspring of Lincoln University alumni include musical legend Cab Calloway; musician and choral director Hall Johnson; civil rights activist Julian Bond; internationally renowned singer, actor, and activist Paul Robeson; Wes Moore, Governor of the State of Maryland; lawyer, author, Episcopal priest and activist Pauli Murray; lawyer, educator and writer Sadie T. M. Alexander; poet and playwright Angelina Weld Grimké; actor Malcolm-Jamal Warner; actress Leslie Uggams and actress Wendy Williams.

Lincoln University has alumni who founded the following six colleges and universities in the United States and abroad: South Carolina State University (Thomas E. Miller), Livingstone College (Joseph Charles Price), Albany State University (Joseph Winthrop Holley), Allen University (William Decker Johnson), Texas Southern University (Raphael O'Hara Lanier), Ibibio State College (Nigeria) (Ibanga Akpabio) and the Kwame Nkrumah University of Science and Technology (Ghana) (King Osei Tutu).

Lincoln University has two alumni honored with commemorative stamps by the United States Postal Service: Thurgood Marshall (BA 1930) and Langston Hughes (BA 1929).

== Staff ==
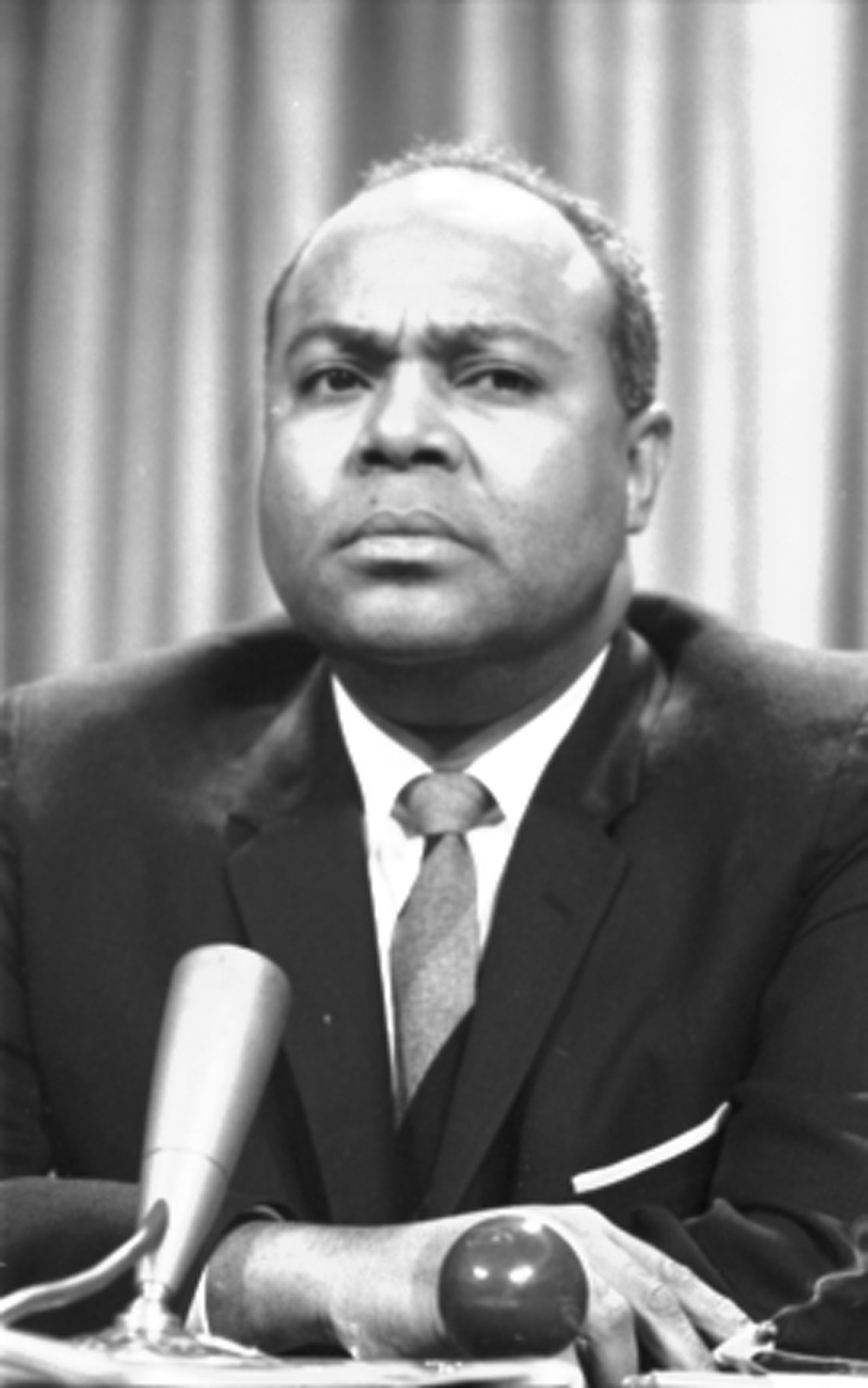
James Farmer

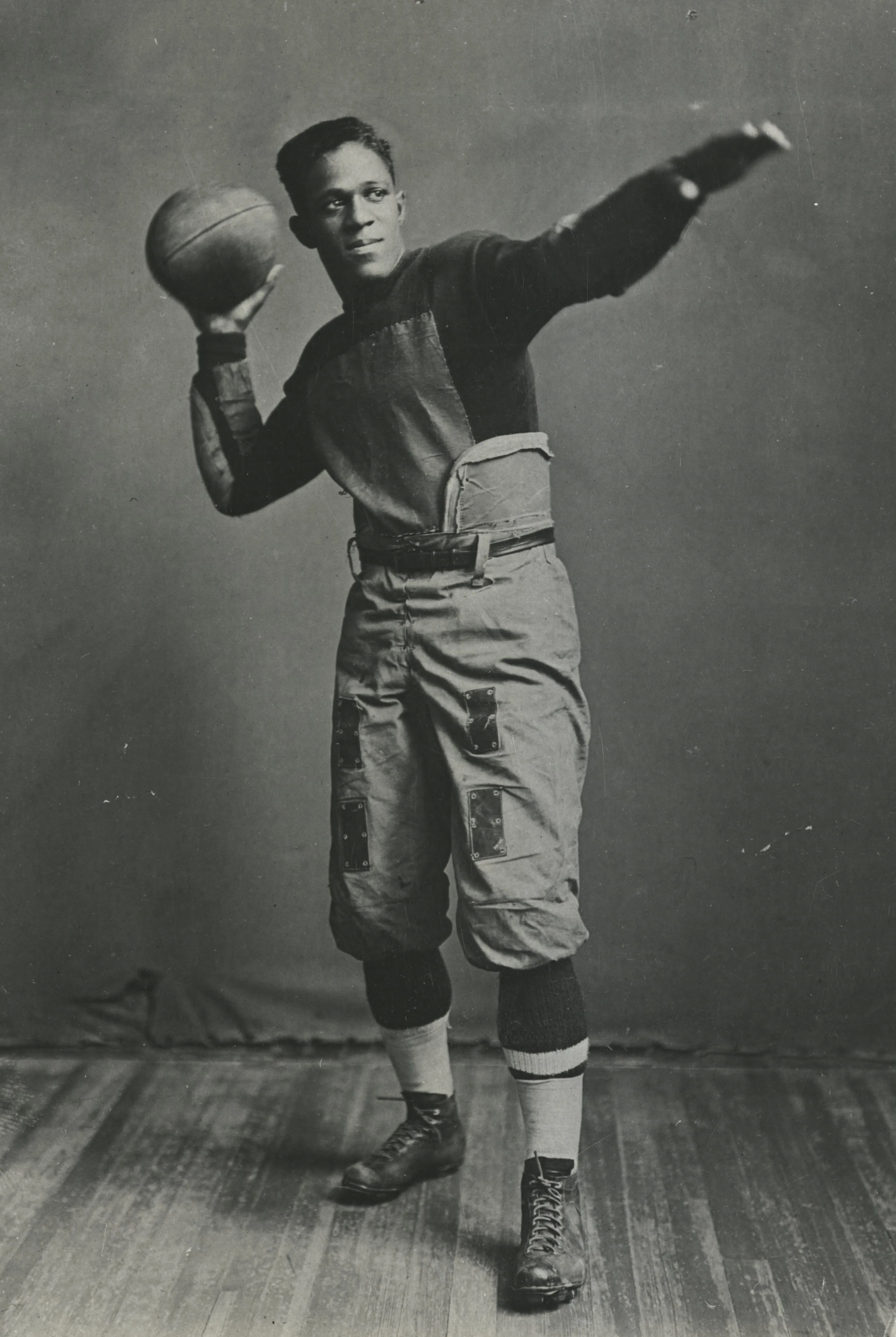
Fritz Pollard
- John Aubrey Davis, Sr., professor of political science (1949–53)
- James Farmer, civil rights activist
- Philip S. Foner, historian, educator, and activist
- Charles V. Hamilton, political scientist, educator, and civil rights activist
- Irv Mondschein, track, basketball, and football coach
- Doug Overton, men's basketball head coach (2016–2020), former NBA point guard
- Fritz Pollard, football coach (1918–20), first African-American NFL coach
