= George C. Rowe =

American poet

George Clinton Rowe (1853–1903) was an American missionary, minister, and poet. He is referred to in James T. Haley's Afro-American Encyclopaedia as the "Palmetto Poet".

== Life and career ==
He was born in Litchfield, Connecticut.

He established the Sunday school with three Newtown children in his house. The popularity of the Bible sessions called for an expanded space.

He became a minister at the Plymouth Congregational Church in Charleston, South Carolina and published verses. Rowe was also a printer at Virginia's Hampton Institute and established what became the Little England Chapel Sunday school.

== Bibliography ==
- "Thoughts in Verse" (1887)
- "Toussaint L'Ouverture" (1890)
- "Our Heroes: Patriotic Poems on Men, Women, and sayings of the Negro race"
