= Livingstone College =

Historically black college in Salisbury, North Carolina, US

- Former names: Zion Wesley Institute (1879–1887)
- Motto: A Call To Commitment. Taking Livingstone College to the next level
- Type: Private historically black college
- Established: 1879; 147 years ago
- Religious affiliation: African Methodist Episcopal Zion Church
- President: Anthony Davis
- Faculty: 57 full time, 17 part time (fall 2024)
- Students: 936 (fall 2024)
- Undergraduates: 924
- Postgraduates: 12
- Location: Salisbury, North Carolina, U.S.
- Campus: Small town, 272 acres (1.10 km^{2})
- Colors: Columbia blue and black
- Nickname: Blue Bears
- Sporting affiliations: NCAA Division II; Central Intercollegiate Athletic Association
- Mascot: The Blue Bear
- Website: livingstone.edu
- Livingstone College Historic District
- U.S. National Register of Historic Places
- U.S. Historic district
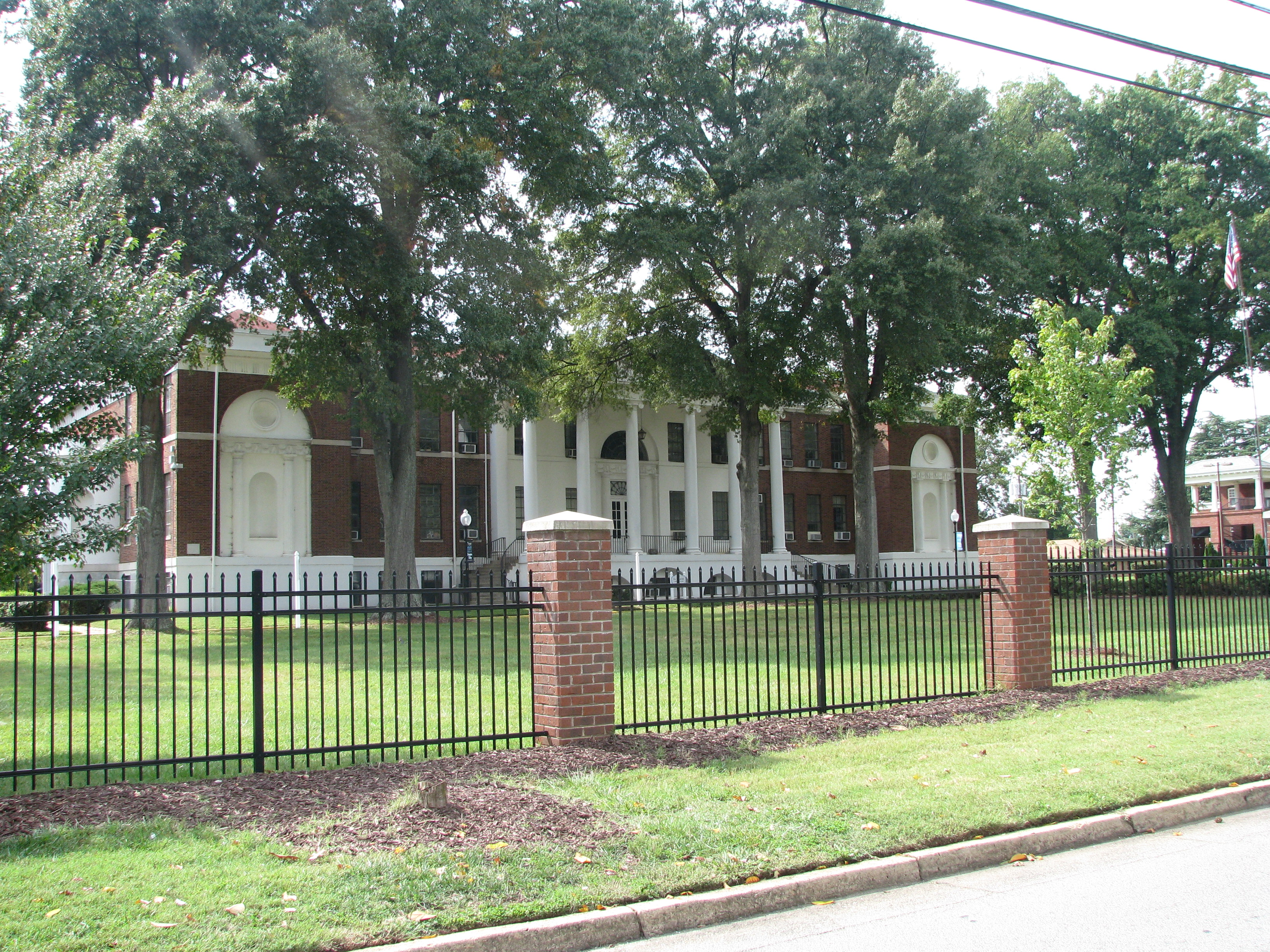
- Livingstone College, September 2012

- Location within North Carolina Location within the United States
- Location: W. Monroe St., Salisbury, North Carolina
- Coordinates: 35°40′14″N 80°28′59″W
- Area: 23 acres (9.3 ha)
- Built: 1882
- Architectural style: Victorian Eclectic
- NRHP reference No.: 82003509 (original); 100012193 (increase)

Significant dates
- Added to NRHP: May 27, 1982
- Boundary increase: September 2, 2025

Livingstone College is a private historically black Christian college in Salisbury, North Carolina. It is affiliated with the African Methodist Episcopal Zion Church. Livingstone College is accredited by the Southern Association of Colleges and Schools to award bachelor's degrees.

== History ==
Livingstone College along with Hood Theological Seminary began as Zion Wesley Institute in Concord, North Carolina in 1879. After fundraising by Joseph C. Price and J. W. Hood, the school was closed in Concord and reopened in 1882 a few miles north in Salisbury.

Zion Wesley Institute was founded by the African Methodist Episcopal (AME) Zion Church. The institute changed its name to Livingstone College in 1887 to honor African missionary David Livingstone. That same year, the school granted its first degree. The first group of students to graduate included eight men and two women, the first black women to earn bachelor's degrees in North Carolina.

Originally beginning with 40 acres on a Salisbury farm called Delta Grove, Livingstone College's main campus now consists of 272 acres.

In 2000, Algeania Freeman became the first woman president of the university.

In August 2014, Livingstone submitted plans for converting a former Holiday Inn on Jake Alexander Boulevard into a hospitality school. Livingstone's School of Hospitality Management & Culinary Arts, a program accredited in 2012, had moved to the new location by 2015.

=== Livingstone College Historic District ===
The Livingstone College Historic District is a national historic district listed on the National Register of Historic Places in 1982. The district encompasses 16 contributing buildings, 1 contributing structure, and 1 contributing object on the Livingstone College campus and adjacent residential sections in Salisbury. Notable buildings include the Price house (1884), Harris house (1889), Aggrey house (1912), Ballard Hall (1887), Dodge Hall (1886), Carnegie Library (1908), Goler Hall (1917), Hood Building (1910), and Price Memorial Building (1930–1943).

== Athletics ==
On the campus is an athletic marker erected in 1956 to commemorate the first African-American intercollegiate football game, in 1892.

Livingstone is a member of the National Collegiate Athletic Association (NCAA), Division II, and the Central Intercollegiate Athletic Association (CIAA). Its intercollegiate sports programs include basketball, bowling, cross-country, football, softball, volleyball, tennis, golf, and track and field. The nickname for the school's teams is the Blue Bears.

The Livingstone College football team has had a long history since playing in the first Black college football game in 1892 against Johnson C. Smith University (then called Biddle University). The rivalry between the two schools continues to this day as the Commemorative Classic. The Blue Bears also maintain a rivalry with their cross town rival Catawba College Indians. The early October game between the two schools is called the Mayors' Cup.

The current football stadium that the university uses for matches is named Alumni Memorial Stadium.

== Notable alumni ==
Name	Class year	Notability	Reference(s)
Charles Sterling Acolatse		Ghana jurist, Supreme Court Judge of Ghana	
James Emman Kwegyir Aggrey		preacher, Pan-African thinker and educator	
Bernard E. Anderson		Whitney M. Young, Jr. Professor Emeritus at the Wharton School of the University of Pennsylvania, where he was the first African American tenured professor was Assistant Secretary of Labor during the Clinton Administration, and is a member of the Board of Trustees of Tuskegee University	
Daniel S. Bentley		minister, writer, and African American newspaper proprietor	
George Lincoln Blackwell	1888	theologian and author	
Solomon Carter Fuller	1893	psychiatrist who made significant contributions to the study of Alzheimer's disease	
Ben Coates	1990	former NFL All-Pro tight end for New England Patriots and Baltimore Ravens	
James Benson Dudley		was President of North Carolina Agricultural and Technical State University in Greensboro, North Carolina from 1896 until his death in 1925	
Roy Davage Hudson	B.S. 1955	neuropharmacologist and former president of Hampton University	
Elizabeth Duncan Koontz	1938	1st Black President of the National Education Association & head of the United States Women's Bureau of the United States Department of Labor	
Vergel L. Lattimore		Air National Guard Brigadier General	
John Kinard	1960	Minister, community activist, and first director of the Anacostia Community Museum in Washington, D.C.	
Philip A. Payton, Jr.		known as the "Father of Harlem"	
Wilmont Perry	1997	former NFL running back for the New Orleans Saints	
John Terry	1991	former CFL All-Star for the Saskatchewan Roughriders	
William J. Trent	1930	Executive Director of the United Negro College Fund	https://www.nytimes.com/1993/11/29/obituaries/william-trent-83-director-of-negro-college-fund.html
Norman Yokely		former baseball pitcher in negro league baseball. He played from 1926 to 1946 with several teams	
Ruth Whitehead Whaley	1919	First Black woman admitted to the bar in New York and North Carolina.	
Drew Powell	2015	Indoor Football League quarterback for the Arizona Rattlers	

== Notable faculty ==
Name	Department	Notability	Reference
Rufus Early Clement	Professor and dean	was the sixth and longest-serving president of historically black Atlanta University in Atlanta, Georgia.	
George James	Professor	was a South American historian and author, best known for his 1954 book Stolen Legacy, in which he argued that Greek philosophy originated in ancient Egypt.	
Natrone Means	Football coach	Former professional American Football running back who played for the San Diego Chargers, Jacksonville Jaguars, and Carolina Panthers of the NFL from 1993 to 2000.	
Carolyn R. Payton	Professor	Director of the Peace Corps during the Carter Administration	
Norries Wilson	Football coach	Became the first African-American head football coach in the Ivy League, with the Columbia University football team in 2006.	
