= Nabrit =

Nabrit is a surname. Notable people with the surname include:

- Cecelia Nabrit Adkins (1923–2007), African-American publisher
- James Nabrit III (1932–2013), African American civil rights attorney, son of James Nabrit Jr.
- James Nabrit Jr. (1900–1997), African-American civil rights attorney
- Samuel M. Nabrit (1905–2003), African-American educator
