= Mary Elliott Hill =

American chemist (1907–1969)

- Born: January 5, 1907; South Mills, North Carolina, US
- Died: February 12, 1969 (aged 62); Frankfort, Kentucky, US
- Education: Virginia State College; University of Pennsylvania
- Known for: Researching ultraviolet spectrometry; Ketene synthesis
- Spouse: Carl McClellan Hill (1907–1995) m. ca 1925
- Scientific career
- Fields: Analytical chemistry
- Workplaces: Hampton Institute; Virginia State College; Bennett College; Tennessee State University; Kentucky State College

Mary Elliott Hill (January 5, 1907 – February 12, 1969) was one of the earliest African-American women to become a chemist. She was known as both an organic and analytical chemist. Hill worked on the properties of ultraviolet light, developing analytic methodology, and, in collaboration with her husband Carl McClellan Hill, developing ketene synthesis which supported the development of plastics. She is believed to be one of the first African-American women to be awarded with a master's degree in chemistry. Hill was an analytical chemist, designing spectroscopic methods and developing ways to track the progress of the reactions based on solubility.

== Early life and education ==
Hill was born in the segregated small town of South Mills, North Carolina, on January 5, 1907, and had two brothers. Her mother was Frances Bass and her father, Robert Elliott, was a fireman.

Hill began attending Virginia State College for Negroes, now Virginia State University (VSU), in 1925, obtaining her bachelor's degree in chemistry in 1929.

== Career ==
After obtaining her degree, Hill began teaching in 1930 at VSU's Laboratory High School. In 1932 she taught chemistry part-time at the Hampton Institute, becoming a full-time faculty member in 1937. From 1938 to 1942, she taught at VSU. Hill also undertook graduate study at the University of Pennsylvania in the summers, awarded the first master's degree in chemistry to an African-American woman in 1941.

She taught at Bennett College in Greensboro, North Carolina, for one year before she was appointed an assistant professor of chemistry at Tennessee A & I State College, a historically black college now known as Tennessee State University. She was a professor of chemistry at Tennessee A & I State College from 1944 to 1962, and was the acting head of the chemistry department from 1951 to 1962. In 1962, her husband, Carl McClellan Hill, who had been the dean of the School of Arts and Sciences at Tennessee A & I, accepted the position as president of Kentucky State College (now Kentucky State University) in Frankfort, Kentucky. Mary Hill followed her husband to Kentucky State and was appointed a professor of chemistry.

Mary and Carl worked together as a team, with Mary specializing as an analytical chemist. The Hills used Grignard reagents to develop chemical syntheses of ketenes, which was funded by grants from the National Science Foundation (NSF) and the U.S. Air Force. Mary Hill developed the analytical methods for the work, and specialized using monomeric ketenes. She utilized spectroscopic methods, including ultraviolet spectrophotometry in her studies and worked to develop analytical methods to track the progress of chemical reactions. Her methods were used to determine the solubility of different components in non-aqueous solutions, which enabled synthetic chemists in their group to identify, isolate, and quantify products. Applicable processes included the polymerization of ketenes, which is used in the synthesis of plastics.

Mary Hill instituted student chapters of the American Chemical Society at some of the historically black colleges and universities where she taught. It is estimated that at least 20 of her students went on to become chemistry professors, and she won awards for her teaching. She was also a member of the Tennessee Academy of Science, the National Institute of Science, Alpha Kappa Alpha National Honor Society, and Beta Kappa Chi.

== Publications ==
Hill was a co-author on more than 40 papers, but was never listed as the senior author.

Mary Elliott Hill collaborated in the writing of two textbooks. The first, General College Chemistry (1944), was written in conjunction with her husband Carl Hill and with Myron B. Towns. The laboratory manual Experiments in Organic Chemistry (1954) was made into four editions.

== Personal life ==
Hill was married to Carl McClellan Hill, but the exact date of their marriage is unknown. One source says that they were married two years after she was introduced to him by a classmate at age 16 while another indicates that they married during her sophomore year at Virginia State College, suggesting that their marriage occurred somewhere between 1925 and 1927. The couple had three children. In a 1963 newspaper interview, they mentioned hobbies such as reading, studying German and Russian, and enjoying flower arranging and watching football. The Hills were active members of their Presbyterian Churches in Nashville, Tennessee, and Frankfort, Kentucky.

The Hills had just returned from a trip to England when Mary died from "a heart condition" she had "for some time" in Frankfort, Kentucky on February 12, 1969.
