= James Nabrit =

James Nabrit may refer to:

- James Nabrit Jr. (1900–1997), American civil rights attorney, father of
- James Nabrit III (1932–2013), African American civil rights attorney
