= National Institute of Science =

U.S. science organization supporting HBCUs

- Formation: 1943
- Founder: Hubert B. Crouch; Thomas Wyatt Turner
- Type: Science organization
- Headquarters: Alabama State University
- Website: https://app.nisweb.org/

The National Institute of Science (NIS) is a non-profit professional organization with the goal of supporting science education and research at historically Black colleges and universities. The organization is one of the oldest professional groups for Black scientists, and was founded as the National Association of Science Teachers in Negro Colleges and Affiliated Institutions in 1943. It was renamed the National Institute of Science in 1944.

== History ==
=== Foundations ===
The initial idea for what would become the National Institute of Science began with Hubert Branch Crouch (1906–1980), a biology teacher at Kentucky State College (now Kentucky State University). In 1931, Crouch attended the third annual National Association for Research in Science Teaching meeting in 1931, and there was inspired to create a group to address various issues he saw within the science curriculums at historically Black colleges and universities (HBCUs), such as intellectual isolation between institutions; lack of resources and funding; and heavy teaching loads for science faculty. Crouch had previously founded another organization, the Council of Science Teachers, within the Kentucky Negro Educational Association (KNEA).

At this point, except in the state of Texas, Black scholars were barred from attending the meetings of most professional science organizations. An exception was the Virginia Academy of Science, however, though it accepted Black scientists, the group did not allow for active participation by those members. Local groups founded by HBCU faculty arose to meet the needs of Black scholars, including KNEA's Council of Science Teachers; the Physics Club in Richmond; the Atlanta Association for the Advancement of Science, affiliated with Morehouse College; the Virginia Conference of Science Teachers, affiliated with the Hampton Institute; and the Alabama Association of Science and Mathematics Teachers.

Between 1936 and 1940, Crouch continued to develop his concept, and sought support from other academics such as H.J. Romm at the Tuskegee Institute and Thomas W. Turner at Hampton Institute (now Hampton University). In March 1940, Crouch presented his idea at the meeting of the Virginia Conference of College Science Teachers with a paper titled "Science Organization in Our Colleges," but it was not taken up at that time. Turner had notably founded the Virginia Conference of College Science Teachers and eventually became a crucial part of the foundation of the NIS.

Over the 1942-1943 years, Turner took an academic leave to complete "A Study of Science Education in the Negro Colleges," which documented science education at various HBCUs in the South and would serve as a basis for the later outline of the NIS. Over the course of his own preparations, Crouch also visited 32 colleges to inquire about their interest in an organized science group during this period. By 1943, multiple Black state educational organizations and teachers' associations across the country actively began looking to formally unify. Concurrently, wartime production at the onset of World War II led to an increased demand for organizing the capability of Black professional scientists and science education at HBCUs.

=== Formal establishment ===
The group formalized on October 26, 1943, at the twenty-first meeting of the Conference of the Presidents of Negro Land-Grant Colleges in Chicago, Illinois. Crouch was joined by nine other representatives from eight other HBCUs to form the organization, including university presidents Rufus B. Atwood and Horace Mann Bond. The group was initially called the National Association of Science Teachers in Negro Colleges and Affiliated Institutions and was renamed the National Institute of Science in 1944. The group outlined its goals in four initial parts:

1. To stimulate interest in the field of science and to improve the teaching of science in the institution.
2. To make science more functional in general instruction, experimentation, and in the service programs of the institution.
3. To make institutional science more functional in the community.
4. To unify organization and individual efforts in the sciences.

This first resolution was signed by the following scientists in attendance: Thomas W. Turner, Eugene D. Raines, Booker T. Griffith, Samuel M. Nabrit, Eldridge A. Miller, William W. Dowdy, James W. Hazzard, Hubert B. Crouch, and Herman R. Branson. The meeting ended with the appointment of officers, including Turner as president; Nabrit as vice president; Crouch as executive secretary; a group of regional directors including John McNeile Hunter; and an executive committee of Branson and John H. Birnie.

=== First meetings ===
The first official meeting of the group was held May 12-13, 1944, at Fort Valley State College and Camp John Hope. The meeting was organized by regional director John McNeile Hunter, and had 36 members in attendance representing 21 colleges and two high schools. At this meeting, the group changed its name to the National Institute of Science. The second annual meeting was held from May 4-5, 1945, at Livingstone College, and saw an increased membership of 56 representing 24 colleges and four high schools. By its third meeting in 1946 at Tennessee Agricultural & Industrial State University (now Tennessee State University), membership had more than doubled. At the fourth meeting in 1947, the group drafted a Constitution outlining its long-term objectives and terms, and a newsletter was established, Transactions.

=== Merger with Beta Kappa Chi ===
At the group's seventh meeting at Central State University in 1950, the group passed a resolution to hold its meetings jointly with the Beta Kappa Chi Honors Society. Beta Kappa Chi had been founded in 1923 by a group of students at Lincoln University in Pennsylvania, among them Hildrus Augustus Poindexter, with the goal of providing a central organization for Black scientists. The first combined meeting of the two groups was held April 16-19, 1952, at Prairie View A&M College.

In 1972, the NIS was incorporated by the state of Virginia as a non-profit organization, and in 1982, the group became an affiliate of the American Association for the Advancement of Science. In 1974, NIS and Beta Kappa Chi partnered with the first national meeting of the National Organization for the Professional Advancement of Black Chemists and Chemical Engineers in New Orleans, Louisiana.

== Activities ==
The NIS holds its annual meeting jointly with Beta Kappa Chi.

Starting in 1984 at the 41st Joint Annual Meeting of the NIS and Beta Kappa Chi in Atlanta, Georgia, the NIS has hosted an annual Memorial Lecture, which features a tribute to scientific predecessors. Other annual activities include workshops, town hall meetings, graduate and undergraduate poster sessions, and the NIS Distinguished lecture.

NIS officers are divided into the positions of president, vice president, executive secretary, treasurer, and editor of the Transactions newsletter. There are also five regional directors and a primary and regional student officers.

== Presidents ==
- 1943: Thomas W. Turner
- 1944: John McNeile Hunter
- 1945: Samuel M. Nabrit
- 1946: Carl McClellan Hill
- 1948: Halson V. Eagleson, Howard University, Washington, D.C.
- 2013-2016: Ruby Broadway, Dillard University, New Orleans, Louisiana
- 2018-2023: Freddie M. Dixon, University of the District of Columbia, Washington, D.C.

== Notable members ==
- Etta Zuber Falconer (Spelman College)
- Annie L. Richardson (Norfolk State University)
- Gloria Long Anderson

== Legacy ==
Various universities have honored the founders of NIS. The Hubert B. Crouch Hall at Tennessee State University is named for Hubert B. Crouch. In 1978, Hampton University named Turner Hall for Thomas Wyatt Turner.
