= 2025 Kentucky State University shooting =

School shooting in Frankfort, Kentucky

Kentucky State University Shooting
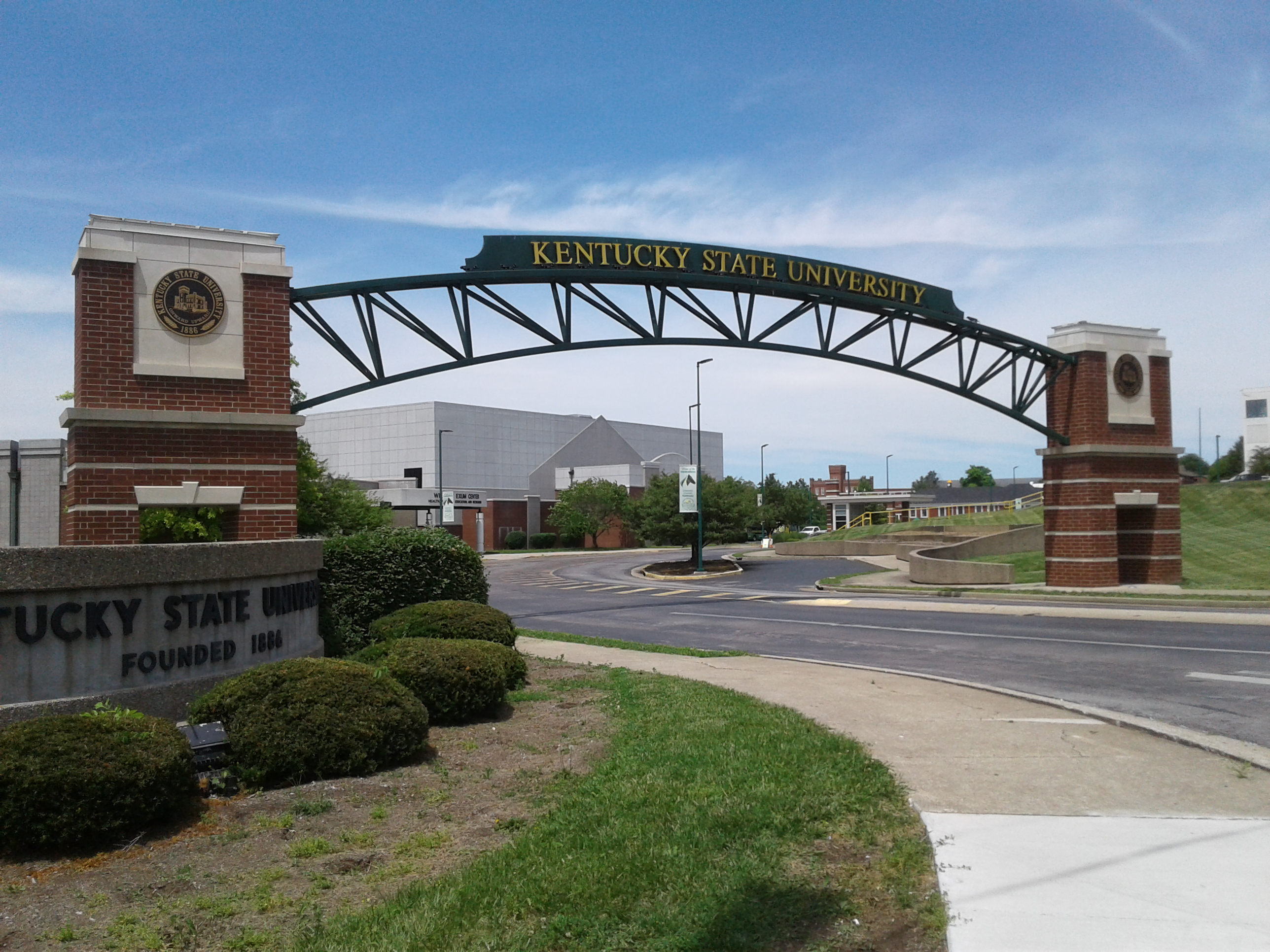
- Kentucky State University, pictured in 2020
- Frankfort, Kentucky, United States
- Date: December 9, 2025
- Location: Kentucky State University, Frankfort, Kentucky, United States; 38°12′00″N 84°51′30″W
- Type: Shooting
- Motive: Self-defense
- Deaths: 1
- Injuries: 1
- Accused: Jacob Lee Bard
- Charges: Murder, first-degree assault (dropped)
- Weapon: Handgun

On December 9, 2025, a self-defense shooting occurred at Kentucky State University in Frankfort, Kentucky, United States. The shooter, Jacob Lee Bard of Evansville, Indiana, a 48-year-old father of a student at the university, was initially charged with murder and first-degree assault. On December 23, the grand jury accepted Bard's self-defense claim and decided not to return an indictment.

== Background ==
Kentucky State University (KSU) is a public historically Black university located in Frankfort, Kentucky, serving undergraduate and graduate students from across the state. The large campus includes multiple residence halls and academic buildings and is monitored by the Kentucky State University Police Department, with additional support from local law enforcement agencies when required.

Jacob Lee Bard's sons were both enrolled at the dormitory. According to Bard's attorney, both sons were honors students and well-liked by their peers. On October 11, 2025, a mob activated a fire alarm, disabled security cameras using fire extinguishers, and robbed the dormitory. One of Bard's sons reported the crime to campus police, after which he reportedly received death threats. One of the robbers brought a gun to campus and had it confiscated by police. KSU's public crime log shows multiple reports of assault, theft, and harassment were filed from August to December 2025, but KSU declined to comment on whether these were investigated.

On December 6, a mob of 15–20 people, mostly non-students, broke into Bard's son's room and destroyed the entire contents of the room, reportedly hundreds of dollars worth of property. Bard's son confined himself to his dorm room and refused to leave, quickly running out of food. On December 8, 20–30 people again surrounded Bard's son's room with "baseball bats and other weapons." Bard's son called Bard and asked to be removed from campus. Bard immediately came to campus and met with campus police and the dean. According to Bard's testimony, he was not reassured of his son's safety.

Prior to the shooting, no campus-wide alerts indicating an imminent threat had been issued. Authorities later described the incident as isolated, emphasizing that there was no ongoing danger to the broader campus community following the suspect's arrest.

== Shooting ==
On the morning of December 9, Bard and his 18-year-old son approached the son's dorm room with campus police, only to be approached by a mob who used their phones to summon others. Bard, his son, and the officer quickly left the building but were soon surrounded and attacked. Bard opened fire with a handgun during a dispute near the Whitney M. Young Jr. Hall residence hall. According to both Bard and a local prosecutor, a group of 20–30 individuals were in the process of attacking Bard's son, which caused him to respond in fear of his and his son's life. Campus police and local law enforcement responded to reports of gunfire and quickly secured the area.

University officials issued an emergency alert advising students and staff to shelter in place while law enforcement conducted a sweep of the residence hall. The lockdown was lifted later the same day after authorities confirmed that the situation was contained.

The attack was the second shooting in four months near the student residence.

After the shooting, Kentucky State University canceled classes and campus activities and offered counseling and support services to students and staff. University officials stated that additional security measures were implemented in the days following the incident. State and local officials also issued statements expressing condolences to the victims and their families.

== Victims ==
One student was killed in the shooting. One other student was transported to a nearby hospital with life-threatening injuries and was later reported to be in stable condition.

== Grand jury finding ==
Bard was booked into jail on murder and first-degree assault charges. He was represented by a public defender. His bond was set at $1 million.

On December 23, a jury declined to indict Bard. Prosecutors announced they will not pursue further charges against Bard but may charge others involved in the incident.

=== Responses ===
The university announced in a statement: "The University is aware of today's grand jury decision. This development does not lessen the pain our community continues to feel, nor does it change our priorities. Our commitment remains centered on supporting our students and ensuring Kentucky State University is a safe place to learn, live, and work." President Koffi C. Akakpo stated, "We remain centered on our students' safety and well-being."

According to Bard's attorney, De'Jon Fox's mother has posted to social media asking the Vice Lords to murder Bard and his sons, who are currently in hiding as of December 24, 2025. On December 25, Fox's parents were arrested and charged with felony intimidation.

== Investigation ==
In January 2026, a Lexington Herald Leader investigation revealed that the shooting had not been entered into KSU's crime log as required by state law. KSU declined to comment on whether they were investigating the student attack or shooting. KSU described the shooting as "just an isolated incident" and said it would review security procedures.
