= Hubert B. Crouch =

American zoologist (1906–1980)

- Born: Hubert Branch Crouch; December 7, 1906; Jacksonville, Texas
- Died: October 17, 1980 (aged 73); Nashville, Tennessee
- Education: Iowa State College (MS, PhD); Texas College (BA)
- Known for: Founding the National Institute of Science
- Scientific career
- Fields: Parasitology, protozoology
- Workplaces: Tennessee State University; Kentucky State College
- Thesis: "The animal parasites of the woodchuck, Marmota monax Linn., with special reference to the protozoa" (1936)

Hubert Branch Crouch (1906–1980) was an American zoologist and parasitologist. His efforts led to the founding of the National Institute of Science, an organization that supports research and science education at historically Black colleges and universities. He was a professor at Tennessee State University for 28 years, serving as the dean of the graduate school, heading the biology department, and directing the science division. He taught biology at Kentucky State College. He earned his PhD in parasitology from the Iowa State College of Agriculture and Mechanic Arts.

== Early life and education ==
Hubert Branch Crouch was born on December 7, 1906, in Jacksonville, Texas, the fifth of seven children of Mary "Carrie" Ragsdale and George Crouch. He attended the historically black Texas College in Tyler, where he was known by the nickname "Red". He was on the debate team, part of the football squad, and played the role of the Boatswain in a production of H.M.S. Pinafore. He was elected class president in 1926 and received a BA with an emphasis in science in 1927. Following his graduation he moved to Dallas where he sold insurance and purchased four vehicles with his earnings.

In 1929, Crouch moved to Ames, Iowa, where he continued his studies at Iowa State College of Agriculture and Mechanic Arts (now Iowa State University). His older sister Geneva also attended Iowa State and they both lived at the home of Nancy and Archie Martin. He earned his MS in protozoology with a minor in soil bacteriology in 1930. He earned his PhD in parasitology, with minors in entomology and botany, from Iowa State in 1936. His doctoral thesis concerned the parasitism of woodchucks and was entitled "The animal parasites of the woodchuck, Marmota monax Linn., with special reference to the protozoa."

== Academic career ==
In February 1931, following the completion of his MS degree at Iowa State College, Crouch took a position as a professor of biology at Kentucky State College (now Kentucky State University). He taught all of the college's biology classes. He left in 1944 when he was hired as a biology professor at Tennessee State University. He headed the Department of Biology and directed the Division of Science. In 1950 he became the graduate school's first full dean. After 28 years at Tennessee State, he retired in 1972.

Crouch was an active researcher and was published in scientific journals.

== Organizing ==
In 1931, not long after he had taken a job as a professor at Kentucky State College, Crouch traveled to New York City to attend the third annual National Association for Research in Science Teaching meeting. He was inspired to create a group to address various issues he saw within the science curriculums at historically Black colleges and universities (HBCUs), such as intellectual isolation between institutions; lack of resources and funding; and heavy teaching loads for science faculty. Crouch had previously founded another organization, the Council of Science Teachers, within the Kentucky Negro Educational Association (KNEA).

In 1939, Crouch collected biological specimens along the Atlantic Seaboard and visited HBCUs. During his trip, he met Thomas Wyatt Turner at the Hampton Institute. Following correspondence with Turner, Crouch attended the Virginia Conference of College Science Teachers in 1939 and presented a paper that outlined his vision for a national science organization, "Science Organization in Our Colleges".

Four years later, in 1943, he joined other educators from HBCUs to form an organization for Black scientists and they presented their proposal at the Conference of the Presidents of Negro Land-Grant Colleges in 1943. The National Association of Science Teachers in Negro Colleges and Affiliated Institutions was established on October 26, 1943, with Crouch as the executive secretary. The name was changed to the National Institute of Science the following year.

Crouch directed the Kentucky Syphilis Service from 1939 to 1943. He founded the Nashville Urban League (now the Urban League of Middle Tennessee) in 1968 along with David K. Wilson and other community and business leaders.

== Personal life ==
In 1935, Crouch married Mildred Shipp, the granddaughter of the Martins who Crouch had lived with in Iowa. They had several children. Crouch's colleagues and friends recalled him as being "insatiably curious, strong-willed, determined, and possessing a sense of humor."

Towards the end of his life, Crouch was "virtually unable to communicate" due to a long illness. He died on October 17, 1980, in Nashville, Tennessee. Tennessee State University renamed its Graduate School Building to the Hubert B. Crouch Building in his honor.
