= James Shelton Hathaway =

American educator (1859–1930)

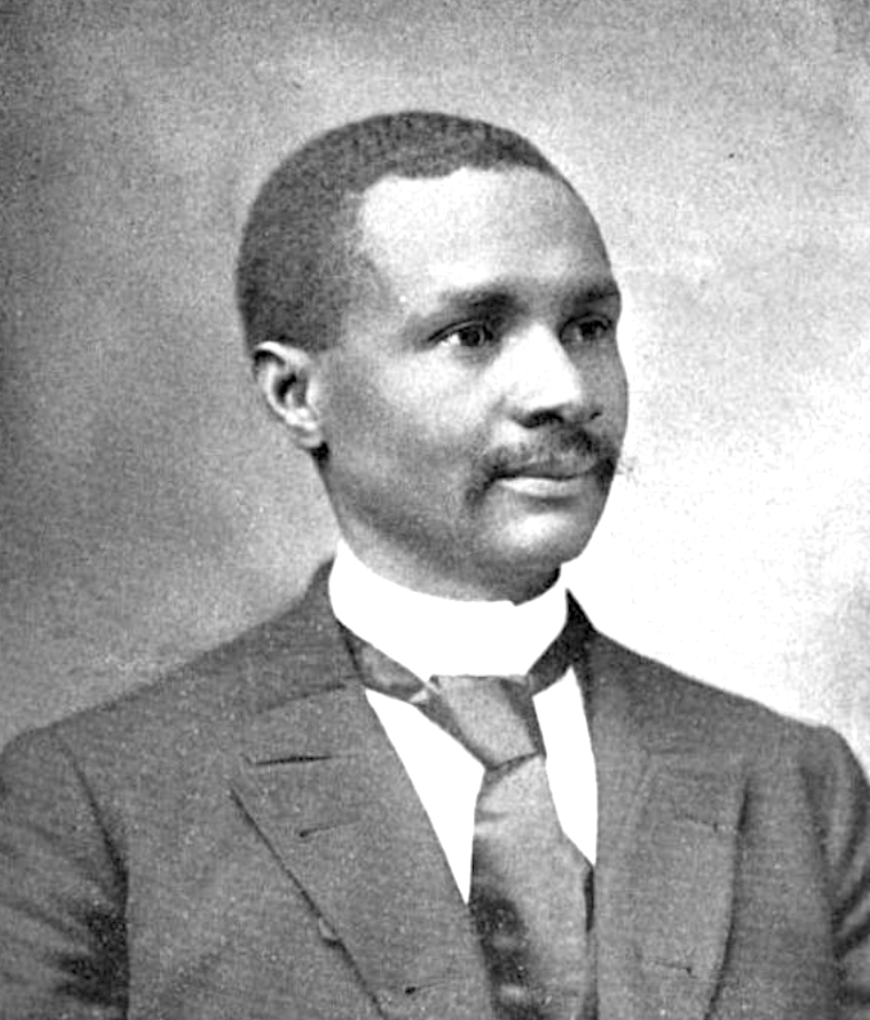

3rd President of Kentucky Normal and Industrial Institute for Colored Persons
- In office 1900–1907
- Preceded by: James Edward Givens
- Succeeded by: John Henry Jackson

5th President of Kentucky Normal and Industrial Institute
- In office 1910–1912
- Preceded by: John Henry Jackson
- Succeeded by: Green Pinckney Russell

Personal details
- Born: March 29, 1859 Mount Sterling, Kentucky, U.S.
- Died: February 17, 1930 (aged 70) Richmond, Kentucky, U.S.
- Spouse: Celia Anderson (m. 1887)
- Children: 2
- Education: Berea College (BA, MA)
- Occupation: Educator, academic administrator, publisher

James Shelton Hathaway (March 29, 1859 – February 17, 1930) was an American educator, academic administrator, and publisher. He was the two term president of the Kentucky Normal and Industrial Institute for Colored Persons (now Kentucky State University) in Frankfort, Kentucky. He was also known as J. S. Hathaway.

== Early life and education ==
James Shelton Hathaway was born into slavery on March 29, 1859, in Mount Sterling, Kentucky. In childhood he attended schools in Madison County, Kentucky.

At the age of 17, Hathaway enrolled in Berea College in Berea, Kentucky. He graduated in 1884 with a B.A. degree in classics.

After graduation from Berea College, Hathaway worked as a tutor of classics and mathematics on campus, under the college president E. Henry Fairchild. During the Fairchild administration, Hathaway was the second Black educator at Berea College (the first being Julia Britton Hooks). He later was made a member of the faculty, and received a M.A. degree in 1891.

On July 21, 1887, Hathaway married Celia Anderson (or Cecelia Anderson), who was also a teacher at Berea. Together they had two children.

== Career and late life ==
Hathaway edited the Lexington Standard newspaper; and founded Intelligence Publishing Company in Lexington, Kentucky.

Historian James M. McPherson has stated Hathaway left Berea College as a result of a dispute with president William Goodell Frost. In 1893, he became a professor of agriculture at the State Normal School for Colored Persons (now Kentucky State University) in Frankfort, Kentucky. Hathaway was made the 3rd president in 1900 of the State Normal School for Colored Persons, succeeding president James Edward Givens. During his first term as president, the school name was changed in 1902 to the Kentucky Normal and Industrial Institute. He stepped down as the president in 1907.

Hathaway was the president of the State Association of Colored Teachers (later known as the Kentucky Negro Educational Association) from 1889 to 1890.

From 1907 to 1910, Hathaway was principal at the Maysville Colored High School in Maysville, Kentucky.

Hathaway returned to the Kentucky Normal and Industrial Institute (now Kentucky State University) to serve a second term as president from 1910 until 1912.

He was the principal of Richmond High School in Richmond, Kentucky starting in 1920. His daughter had also worked as a teacher at Richmond High School.

Hathaway died on February 17, 1930, after an illness.
