= Joseph Pierce =

Joseph Pierce may refer to:

- Joseph Pierce (soldier) (1842–1916), Chinese American soldier who fought in the Civil War
- Joseph Algernon Pearce (1893–1988), Canadian astrophysicist
- Joseph Alphonso Pierce (1902–1969), American mathematician and statistician
- Joseph H. Pierce Jr. (1927–2018), American Thoroughbred racehorse owner and trainer
