= Roy Davage Hudson =

American university president and educator (1930–2024)

10th President of Hampton Institute
- In office 1970–1976
- Preceded by: Jerome H. Holland
- Succeeded by: Carl McClellan Hill

13th President of Livingstone College
- In office 1995 – 1996 (interim)
- Preceded by: Bernard W. Franklin
- Succeeded by: Burnett W. Joiner

Personal details
- Born: June 30, 1930 Chattanooga, Tennessee, U.S.
- Died: April 17, 2024 (aged 93) Hampton, Georgia, U.S.
- Spouse: Constance Joan Taylor (m. 1956–2024; his death)
- Children: 2
- Education: Livingstone College, University of Michigan
- Occupation: Academic administrator, educator, businessman, university department dean, university president, neuropharmacologist, public relations

Roy Davage Hudson (June 30, 1930 – April 17, 2024) was an American academic administrator, educator, neuropharmacologist, businessman, and university president. He served as the tenth president of Hampton Institute (now Hampton University) in Hampton, Virginia, from 1970 to 1976; and he served as the thirteenth interim president of Livingstone College in Salisbury, North Carolina, from 1995 to 1996. As a neuropharmacologist, Hudson researched the interaction of certain chemical agents with neurons; which resulted in multiple publications, including in the Merck Index and he held leadership positions in pharmaceutical manufacturing firms.

== Early life and education ==
Roy Davage Hudson was born on June 30, 1930, in Chattanooga, Tennessee, to parents Everence (née Wilkerson) and James Roy Hudson. He graduated from high school at age 16. From 1948 until 1952, Hudson served in the United States Air Force and stationed in Alaska where he worked on engine repair of airplanes damaged during the Korean War.

Hudson attended Livingstone College in Salisbury, North Carolina from 1952 to 1955, where he graduated with a B. S. degree (1955). He was a member of the Livingstone football team where he was an all-conference athlete, and was named all-time all-Livingstone Football in 1969. He continued his education at the University of Michigan in Ann Arbor, Michigan where he received a M.S. degree (1957) in zoology, and Ph.D. (1962) in pharmacology. He was the first Black student to receive a PhD in pharmacology from the University of Michigan.

In 1956, he married Constance "Connie" Joan Taylor, a classmate from Livingstone College, and together they had two children.

== Career ==
In 1966, Hudson was hired as an associate professor of neurology at Brown University in Providence, Rhode Island. While at Brown University he also took on the role of department associate dean and he was part of a committee for on-campus drug issues. He also taught pharmacology at the University of Virginia in Charlottesville, Virginia. While living in Rhode Island, he was a member of the Ebenezer Baptist Church in Providence.

In the early 1970s, Hudson served as a co-director of a conference focused on Black culture and education, affiliated with the National Council of Churches in the United States. He was a member of numerous organizations including the American Society of Pharmacology and Experimental Therapeutics (where he served as president-elect), the Society of Religion in Higher Education, the American Association for the Advancement of Science, the American Men of Science, the Executive Council of Livingstone College, the Afro-American Society of the Connecticut College for Women, the National Association for the Advancement of Colored People (NAACP), and the Rhode Island Commission on Economic Development, among others.

Hudson became the tenth president of Hampton Institute (now Hampton University) in 1970 in Hampton, Virginia. He was chosen as president from approximately 100 candidates. While he was president, the university received a large donation in 1972 by David Packard, the former co-founder of Hewlett-Packard and the former Deputy Secretary of Defense. He stepped down from the role of president in 1976, and cited personal reasons.

After leaving Hampton University, he returned to pharmacology and served as the director (later as vice president) of the research labs at Parke Davis from 1977 to 1979. This was followed by multiple roles at Upjohn, initially as director of research (of the central nervous system) from 1981 to 1987; vice president of research and development in Europe from 1987 to 1990; vice president of corporate public relations (later part of Pharmacia & Upjohn) from 1990 to 1992.

== Retirement and death ==
Hudson retired in 1992, however Hudson served as an interim president for his alma mater Livingstone College from 1995 to 1996. He was awarded honorary degrees from Brown University, Lehigh University, and Princeton University.

Hudson died in Hampton, Georgia on April 17, 2024, at the age of 93.
