= Gloria Long Anderson =

Chemist and school administrator

- Born: November 5, 1938 (age 87); Altheimer, Arkansas, United States
- Education: Arkansas Agricultural, Mechanical, and Normal College; Atlanta University; University of Chicago
- Scientific career
- Fields: Chemistry
- Workplaces: Morris Brown College

Gloria Long Anderson (born November 5, 1938) is the Fuller E. Callaway Professor of Chemistry at Morris Brown College, and its vice president for academic affairs. She has served as interim president of Morris Brown, and as vice chair of the Corporation for Public Broadcasting. She was a pioneer in the field of nuclear magnetic resonance spectroscopy, and is known for her studies of fluorine-19 and solid rocket propellants.

== Early life ==
Anderson was born November 5, 1938, in Altheimer, Arkansas, where she was raised. She is the fourth child, and only girl, in a family of six children. In an interview with Jeanette E. Brown, she explains that she did not feel different, despite being the only girl, because "I mostly played sports along with them, like basketball, softball, and that kind of stuff. (...) My youngest brother would play dolls with me and the rest of them would not, but you know, I really didn't think too much about it."

She is the daughter of Elsie Lee Foggie Long, a seamstress, and Charles Long, a sharecropper, with a tenth and third grade education, respectively. They lived in a mixed-race, segregated farming community. Later, both her parents worked at the Pine Bluff Arsenal, her mother in the Armament Division and her father as a janitor. Growing up, she was expected to help with farm work, and years later, explained: "In those days we didn't know we were living in poverty."

Her parents prioritized her education (and the education of her brothers with three of her brothers also attended the University of Arkansas). They allowed her to start elementary school at the age of four ("they didn't check very carefully in those days"), by which time she had already learned to read. She attended segregated public schools, including the Altheimer Training School. She was an excellent student who skipped grades, graduating high school valedictorian at age 16, in 1954. The faculty at Altheimer Trainer School was entirely African American, and was highly encouraging of their students. She explained that the teachers "pushed us to succeed, to excel, because they had a vested interest in turning out successful, well-educated students. They cared, intimately, about us doing well." The school offered very little science education, and very little math.

Very few jobs were available for African American women in Altheimer, so Anderson chose to attend college, hoping to pursue a career. She hadn't planned to pursue a career in science, and had instead considered careers in physical education and interior decorating.

== Education ==
=== Bachelor's Degree ===
Anderson started studying at the Arkansas Agricultural, Mechanical, and Normal College, a state-supported school for African Americans. She received a small scholarship in her first year, followed by a Rockefeller Foundation College Scholarship between 1956 and 1958 in recognition of her stellar grades. As part of the scholarship, she worked as a teaching assistant, helping in the chemistry classes. She also worked during the summer, working in a candy factory in Chicago between her junior and senior years. Despite not having studied chemistry in high school, she had initially signed up to the chemistry courses on a dare, because chemistry was considered to be the most difficult major. She graduated with a degree in chemistry and mathematics in 1958, as the valedictorian, summa cum laude, first in a class of 237. Dr. Martin Luther King Jr. was the commencement speaker at her graduation, and he was a source of inspiration throughout her life.

Though she was accepted to graduate school at Stanford University, she was unable to study there for lack of funding. She was then rejected for a position at the Ralston Purina Company as a chemist because she was African-American. She later said that "they did me a favor by not hiring me, but I didn't realize it at the time."

=== Master's Degree ===
With no other options, Anderson taught geography, reading and arithmetic in seventh grade at a school in Altheimer for six months (even though, by her own admission, "I didn't even know any more about geography than the students did"). She was then offered a National Science Foundation grant by Kimuel Alonzo Huggins, the chair of the Atlanta University chemistry department, to study for a master's degree in chemistry. Upon her marriage to Leonard Sinclair Anderson in 1960, she almost dropped out of the program due to financial difficulty, despite the fellowship. Dr. Huggins intervened again, and provided her with research funding so that she could continue studying in his lab. She accepted, even though she "didn't particularly like" his research topic. Anderson earned her master's degree in organic chemistry at Atlanta in 1961, with a thesis supervised by Dr. Huggins on a novel synthesis process of butadiene, titled: "Studies on 1-(4-Methylphenyl)-1,3-Butadiene".

She taught for a year at South Carolina State College in Orangeburg. Anderson then moved back to Atlanta, to Morehouse College. She was contacted by Henry Cecil Ransom McBay, the "father of black chemists in the United States", who had made it his mission to seek out and train talented African American chemists. Anderson worked for him as a chemistry instructor and research assistant for two years. In her own words, Anderson "loved teaching organic chemistry, because, first of all, I learned a whole lot of organic chemistry while I was teaching it." McBay encouraged her to pursue her doctoral studies.

=== PhD ===
Anderson began her doctoral studies at the University of Chicago (McBay's alma mater) in 1965, and received a research and teaching assistantship. In her first year, she was the only Black, full-time organic chemistry student. She tutored white women chemistry students in her first year, but decided to focus on herself when she realized that, due to the prevalent racism of the time, they had advantages she did not have. In her interview with Jeannette E. Brown, she recounts an incident in which she failed a first-year exam (prelims, "the first time I had ever failed anything in my life") and received the recommendation that she should not take it over. Though everyone in the class had failed the prelim, most of them received the recommendation to take it over. When she confronted her advisor, he told her that she had achieved the second highest score in the group. Because of this, Anderson spent the summer looking for a job in Chicago, and poring through her physical organic chemistry textbook. She later received a phone call from the University of Chicago, with a job offer to work with Dr. Leon Stock as a research assistant. To test her skills, he set her the assignment which none of his students had so far managed to complete: to make 9-fluora-anthracene from a procedure detailed in a French paper. Anderson, never having studied French, went to the bookstore, bought a French dictionary, translated the paper, and carried out the experiment successfully on her first try. She later took the prelim test again, and passed.

She had enjoyed her experience in Dr. Stock's lab, so she continued her research with him, working on the nuclear magnetic resonance and CF infrared frequency shifts of fluorine-19, and published at least one paper before she had completed her dissertation (which they wrote "over the weekend"). Anderson would work in the lab during the day, then on her dissertation at night at home. She was a pioneer in the field of fluorine Nuclear Magnetic Resonance (NMR) spectroscopy ("didn't nobody know how to operate it but me"). Throughout her time at the University of Chicago, she was mentored by Thomas Cole (who later became president of Clark Atlanta University). Cole was working as a teaching assistant, and was the one who taught her the basics of NMR. Anderson received her physical organic chemistry Ph.D. in 1968. Her thesis was titled: "19F Chemical Shifts For Bicyclic and Aromatic Molecules". In the paper which resulted from her thesis, she coins the term "substituent chemical shift".

== Career ==
=== Academia ===
In 1968, Anderson chose to conduct her post-doctoral research at a historically Black college ("it didn't make a difference which one") in the wake of the assassination of Martin Luther King Jr. in April of that year, and considered this her contribution to the American civil rights movement. She knew at the time that this choice was considered by some of her friends to be "professional suicide", and she herself believes that she could have accomplished much more in a different setting. However, she was firm in her resolution, and turned down offers from majority white universities over the course of her career. In her interview with Jeannette E. Brown, she explained her motivation: "I wanted to go to a Black college to allow the students to have the opportunity to get the kind of education that I had gotten; because I felt coming from where I came from that it was almost impossible for me to get the kind of training I had gotten. (...) I squeezed through the wire mesh fence." On Dr McBay's advice, Anderson applied for the position of chair at Morris Brown College's department of chemistry in Atlanta. She was awarded the position, and became associate professor at the college. As chair of the chemistry department, she made substantial improvements so that it could be approved by the American Chemical Society. Despite receiving other offers of employment, Anderson chose to remain at Morris Brown because "of the educational philosophy at Morris Brown, in that Morris Brown takes in some of the brightest students there are, but at the same time, Morris Brown allows students who are not in upper echelon to come in here." On top of her teaching commitments, starting in the summer of 1969 Anderson carried out post-doctoral research at the Georgia Institute of Technology, working with Dr. Charles L. Liotta on "Studies on the mechanism of epoxidation".

Anderson explains that when she joined Morris Brown, the Vice President of Academic Affairs told her that it was a teaching institution, and that if she wanted to carry out research, "you do that on your own time." So, she says: "I did it in on my own time. I worked in the evenings and on Saturdays and Sundays. (...) I was determined to do [research]. But more importantly, I love research, and I still love research." Anderson continued her research continued on fluorine-19 and its interactions with other atoms, using it to probe synthesis reactions. Anderson's research has also covered epoxidation mechanisms, solid-fuel rocket propellants, antiviral drug synthesis, fluoridated pharmaceutical compounds, and substituted amantadines. Her work has been applied to antiviral drugs. She received patents for her work in 2001 and 2009.

Throughout her career, she struggled to receive funding, and attributes much of this to the racism of the time. She used money from her own salary to fund her research. In her 2009 interview with Jeanette E. Brown, she explains: "it became clear to me that if I was at Morris Brown College, a college with did not have a history of research in chemistry or biology like that, that nobody was going to give me any money for research. (...) So, I decided, well, I'm going to do research no matter what. (...) I paid [students] out of my pocket, and I charged that on my credit card. Even today, I don't know how much I owe the patent lawyers, but I have paid for all those patents stuff, myself."

In 1973, she became the Fuller E. Callaway Professor of Chemistry and Chair, which she returned to in 1990 after serving as Dean of Academic Affairs from 1984 to 1989. Anderson worked as a National Science Foundation Research Fellow (1981) and Research Consultant (1982) for the Lockheed Georgia Corporation, and later as SCEE Faculty Research Fellow for the U.S Air Force Rocket Propulsion Laboratory at the Edwards Air Force Base (1984). She also worked as a consultant for IPECS Holland, a Dutch chemical and pharmaceutical research company (1990).

Anderson became Morris Brown's interim president twice, from 1992 to 1993 and in 1998, and was Dean of Science and Technology from 1995 to 1997. Since 1999 and as of 2009, she is the Fuller E. Callaway Professor of Chemistry. Twice, she served as interim president of Morris Brown. As of 2011, Anderson works as assistant to the president of Morris Brown College.

Anderson was named among the brightest scientists in Atlanta, Georgia, in 1983 by Atlanta Magazine. She was also named among the Outstanding Black Educators in Atlanta in the 1991 edition of SuccessGuide.

=== Outside of academia ===
Outside of academia, Anderson was appointed by President Richard Nixon for a six-year term on the Corporation for Public Broadcasting's (CPB) board in 1972. In actuality, she served seven years because of a delay in the confirmation of her successor. While at the CPB, she also served as chair for committees on Minority Training, Minorities and Women, and Human Resources Development, and later as vice chair of the board from 1977 to 1979. Anderson actively worked to encourage positive portrayals of minorities in public broadcasting.

Throughout her career, Anderson has held many board and committee leadership positions, including as chair of the Greater Atlanta Public Broadcasting Study Committee (1974-1976), as vice president of the Public Broadcasting Atlanta Board (1980-1982), and at Morris Brown College, chair of the Promotion and Tenure Ad Hoc Appeals Committee (2000), chair of the Academic Planning Task Force (2003), chair of the Faculty Retention Task Force (2003) and chair of the Academic Affairs Council (2004). She has also been on an advisory committee for the U.S Food and Drug Administration.

== Personal life ==
She married Leonard Sinclair Anderson, a schoolteacher in 1960. In Chicago, while Anderson was studying for her PhD, Leonard attended the Chicago Conservatory of Music, graduating with a master's degree. Talking about her marriage, Anderson said: "at that time, you know, we had not been liberated, so we didn't know we weren't supposed to be cooking and cleaning and all that. I did all that, as well as I went through graduate school. I was married. I came home. I cooked and I cleaned and ironed and all of that when I was married."

Leonard and Gloria divorced in 1977. Anderson has one son, Gerald (b. 1961).

In her interview with Jeanette E. Brown, Anderson explained: "I have always had to prove myself wherever I went. I had to prove myself in Chicago. When I proved myself, I didn't have any m ore trouble. When I went to Georgia Tech as a post-doc, I had to prove myself. After I proved myself, I didn't have any problem. (...) The point is, they didn't pay me attention, because they didn't know I knew anything. They didn't think I knew what I was talking about. It has always been that way whenever I present myself in chemistry."

Anderson is quoted as saying, to a group of young scientists, "[You] can do anything that you want to do. You can be anything that you want to be. However, you must be determined. You must work hard. You must not let anyone define who you are and what you can do." She adds, "As Dr. Martin Luther King, Jr. said at my college commencement, and I paraphrase, 'Don't go out to be the best black scientist, Go out to be the best scientist.' "

== Honors ==
Anderson is a member of the American Chemical Society, the National Institute of Science, and the National Science Teachers Association.

She has received numerous honors and awards, including:

- Rockefeller Scholarship, (1956-1958)
- Sixth Edition Award, Atlanta Chapter, National Association of Media Women (1978)
- Chairlady's Award, Atlanta Chapter, National Association of Media Women (1978)
- Public Broadcasting Service Award, Atlanta Chapter, National Association of Media Women (1978)
- Outstanding Black Women, the Utopian Club (1979)
- Faculty Industrial Research Fellowship, National Science Foundation (1981)
- Certificate of Appreciation, State of Georgia (1982)
- Scroll of Honour from the National Association of Negro Business and Professional Women (1983)
- Faculty Research Fellowship, Southeastern Centre for Electrical Engineering Education, Air Force Office for Scientific Research (1984)
- Appreciation Award, Air Force Rocket Propulsion Laboratory (1984)
- Presidential Citation in Recognition of Exemplary Experiences that Honor My Alma Mater, National Association for Equal Opportunity in Higher Education (1986)
- Alumni All-Star Excellence Award in Education, University of Arkansas at Pine Bluff (1987)
- YWCA Salute to Women of Achievement (1989)
- UNCF Distinguished Scholar Award, United Negro College Fund (1989-1990)
- "Women of Color in the Struggle", A Consortium of Doctors LTD (1991)
- "A Salute to Black Mothers: For Outstanding Contributions to the Black Community", Concerned Black Clergy of Metro Atlanta, Inc. (1992, 1998)
- Proclamation, "Gloria Long Anderson Day", City of Atlanta, Georgia (1993)
- Outstanding Georgia Citizen, State of Georgia (1998)
- Scroll of Honor Award, University of Arkansas at Pine Bluff (2002)

She received many teaching awards while at Morris Brown College, including:

- Outstanding Service Award, Special Services Students, Morris Brown College (1970)
- Outstanding Teacher, Senior Class, Morris Brown College (1976)
- Outstanding Service Award, Student Assistance Program, Morris Brown College (1977)
- Teacher of the Year Award (1983)
- Faculty/Staff Hall of Fame, Senior Class, Morris Brown College (1983)
- Special Service Award, Morris Brown College (1983)
- Appreciation Award, Upward Bound Program, Morris Brown College (1983)
- Appreciation Plaque, PREP Class of 1985, Morris Brown College (1985)
- Service Above Self Award, TRIO programs, Morris Brown College (1985)
- Appreciation Award, Scholars Restaurant, Morris Brown College (1989-1990)
- Appreciation Trophy, Morris Brown College Upward Bound Program (1991)
- Outstanding Education Award, West Georgia Chapter, Morris Brown College National Alumni Association (1999)

A number of appreciation plaques have also been dedicated in her honor:

- Congratulatory Plaque, Arkansas A. M. & N. College Alumni Association (1973)
- Appreciation Plaque, Native American Public Broadcasting Consortium (1977)
- Appreciation Plaque, Task Force on Minorities in Public Broadcasting (1978)
- Appreciation Plaque, Metro SYETP, DeKalb County SYETP, and Upward Bound (1985)
- Appreciation Plaque, Martin/Altheimer School Reunion (1986)
- Plaque, Achievement, 120th Founder's Day Celebration, University of Arkansas at Pine Bluff (1993)
- Appreciation Plaque, Morris Brown College TRIO Programs (1996, 1997)
- Recognition Plaque, Morris Brown College (1998)
- Appreciation Plaque, "In appreciation for Faculty Leadership", Morris Brown College Faculty (2004)
