= Joseph Alphonso Pierce =

American mathematician and statistician

Joseph Alphonso Pierce Sr. (August 10, 1902 – September 18, 1969) was an African American mathematician and statistician. He was one of the first African Americans to earn a PhD in mathematics in the United States. He was an educator who had a long career as teacher, administrator, and researcher.

== Early life and education ==
Joseph Alphonso Pierce was born August 10, 1902, in Waycross, Georgia. He was the son of William Arthur Pierce, a Methodist minister, and Fannie McGraw. He was orphaned at an early age and was raised by his uncle Joseph McGraw. He received his early education from public schools in Georgia.

He receiving his bachelor's degree in social science from Atlanta University in 1925. Pierce got his master's degree in mathematics from Atlanta University in 1930 and earned a Ph.D. from the University of Michigan in 1938 with the dissertation "A Study of a Universe of N Finite Populations with Application to Moment-Function Adjustments for Grouped Data" under advisor Harry C. Carver.

== Career ==
Pierce began his career at Texas College in Tyler, Texas where he was an instructor in the Mathematics Department from 1925 to 1927. Having played college varsity football at Atlanta University, Pierce also was an assistant coach for the football team there. He then spent two years, from 1927 to 1929, as a math teacher at Booker T. Washington High School in Atlanta, Georgia. After receiving his master's in 1930, Pierce took a position as a professor of mathematics at Wiley College in Marshall, Texas. It was here that he began to work on his PhD. During this period, with his wife, Dr. Juanita G. Pierce, he had one son (Joseph Alphonso Pierce Jr.). Upon earning his PhD in 1938, Joseph Pierce returned to Atlanta University where he taught math and statistics and also served as the chair of the Department of Mathematics. In 1948 Pierce moved to Texas State College for Negroes (later to become Texas Southern University) in Houston, where he was professor of mathematics from 1948 to 1954, head of the Mathematics Department from 1948 to 1957, and chair of the Division of Natural Physical Sciences. He continued to progress at the university, eventually becoming the Dean of the Graduate School in 195. Pierce continued to teach and be involved in various ways at Texas Southern for many years until 1967 when he was elected President of the university. He was also a consultant to NASA for a period of two years (1967–1968).

=== Negro Business and Business Education ===
While in Atlanta (1944–1946), Pierce was appointed research director of a large study of African American businesses and business opportunities sponsored by Atlanta University. He later published the results of this study and more in his book Negro Business and Business Education: Their Present and Prospective Development (1947). Although he was a talented mathematician and statistician, Joseph Pierce was most known for this work. What he found was that black owned businesses captured a very small percentage of what could be their potential patronage. He saw that 99 percent of black customers bought clothes and shoes from white-owned businesses and that only 28 percent of black people went to black-owned grocery stores. Causes for this ranged from lack of sales promotion, inadequate business training, and subpar record-keeping on the part of black business owners.

This book was quite influential and laid the groundwork for Atlanta University to establish a graduate School of Business Administration. Pierce spent the better part of the rest of his life dedicating himself to the cause of enlarging job opportunities for African Americans and cooperating with local universities to improve services to the black community. He regularly encouraged black business leaders to look for new areas of growth and to strive to serve the needs of the black consumer so as to keep the wealth within the community.

== Accomplishments ==
As noted before, Pierce was most famously known for his publication of Negro Business and Business Education: Their Present and Prospective Development. Along with that, Pierce was a member of Sigma Xi, Beta Kappa Chi, and Alpha Phi Alpha fraternity. He was also a member of the Institute of Mathematical Statistics, the American Statistical Association, the National Institute of Science, the Texas State Teachers Association, the American Mathematical Society, and the National Education Association.

== Publications ==
=== Academic papers ===
- Pierce, Joseph. On the Summation of Progressions Useful in Time Series Analysis, Journal of the American Statistical Association 39 (1944), 387–89.
- Pierce, Joseph. Correction Formulas for Moments of a Grouped-Distribution of Discrete Variates, Journal of the American Statistical Association 38 (1943), 57–62.
- Pierce, Joseph. A Study of a Universe of n Finite Populations with Application to Moment-Function Adjustments for Grouped Data, Annals of Mathematical Statistics 11, no. 3 (1940). 311–34.

=== Books ===
- Edmondson, Ralph A. and Pierce, Joseph A., Elementary Mathematics and Applications (1934)
- Edmondson, Ralph A. and Pierce, Joseph A. Introductory College Mathematics and Applications (1937).
- Pierce, Joseph A. The Atlanta Negro: A Collection of Data on the Negro Population of Atlanta, Georgia (1940).
