= Beta Kappa Chi =

American honor society for science and math

- ΒΚΧ
- Founded: January 31, 1923; 103 years ago Lincoln University
- Type: Honor
- Affiliation: ACHS
- Status: Active
- Emphasis: Natural science and Mathematics
- Scope: National
- Motto: "Science holds the Golden Key to the Royal Palace of Knowledge"
- Colors: Golden Yellow and Royal Blue
- Symbol: Clover Leaf, Skull and Crossed Bones, Circle, Retort, Balance, Scroll with stencils
- Publication: Beta Kappa Chi Bulletin
- Chapters: 67
- Members: 66,000 lifetime
- Headquarters: c/o Southern University and A&M College; 244 William James Hall; PO Box 10046; Baton Rouge, Louisiana 70813; United States
- Website: www.betakappachi.org

Beta Kappa Chi (ΒΚΧ) is an American collegiate honor society that recognizes academic achievement in the fields of natural science and mathematics. It was established in 1923 at Lincoln University, a historically Black university near Oxford, Pennsylvania. It has established more than 65 chapters in the United States, and is a member of the Association of College Honor Societies.

== History ==
Beta Kappa Chi Scientific Society was founded by science students and faculty at Lincoln University on January 31, 1923. Its faculty supporters were Harold Fetter Grimm, head of the department of biology; Arthur E. James, professor of chemistry' and Walter Livingstone Wright, professor of mathematics.

Its 24 charter members were:

- Horace Mann Bond
- Lawrence N. Brown
- Walter C. Coles
- Edward D. Dukes
- Emanuel R. Ferguson
- Adelphus N. Gordon
- James W. Grimes
- Irving S. Hamer
- William B. Hamer
- Henry A. Haskell
- Robert S. Jason
- Carson C. Johnson
- Paul H. Logan
- Fletcher A. Moncur
- Clifford D. Nixon
- Hildrus Poindexter
- Henry C. Redmond
- Lewis E. Redmond
- Harvey J. Reynolds
- Anderson T. Scott
- Maceo A. Simmons
- Fred L. Stiger
- Samuel T. Washington
- I. J. K. Wells

Six of its charter members became medical doctors, one became a dentist, and another became a college president.

The charter members created a constitution and selected the society's keys and symbols. Initially, Beta Kappa Chi operated as a local science club. Its first guest speaker was Ernest Everett Just, a biologist from Howard University.

It became a national organization on May 8, 1926, with the establishment of the Beta chapter at West Virginia State College. Beta Kappa Chi Honorary Scientific Society was incorporated in 1929. Its purpose was to encourage and advance scientific education, research, and the dissemination of scientific knowledge. Chapters were limited to accredited "grade A" colleges and universities.

Next, Gamma chapter was established at Howard University. By 1936, there were eight chapters. The society expanded to other historically black colleges and universities in the United States through 1941. However, the organization almost collapsed in 1941, surviving by the re-establishment of the Delta chapter at Johnson C. Smith University by its local science club and by the recruitment activities by members of the Alpha chapter. Gamma chapter was reestablished in 1943.

To increase organizational stability, the society added a faculty sponsor for each chapter. This helped stabilize all eight of the Beta Kappa Chi chapters and brought the addition of thirteen more chapters. A grand chapter was established to oversee the national organization and to support alumni engagement.

The society published its first newsletter, Beta Kappa Chi Scientific Society News Letter, in May 1943; its name was changed to the current Beta Kappa Chi Bulletin with the third issue in May 1944.

The society changed its name to Beta Kappa Chi National Honor Society in 1960. It was admitted to the Association of College Honor Societies in 1961. Nearly every historically Black college and university in the United States had a chapter of Beta Kappa Chi by 1965.

As of 2024, Beta Kappa Chi honor society has 67 active chapters across the United States, and 66,000 members. It is a scholastic honor society that recognizes academic achievement among students in the fields of natural science and mathematics. It is the oldest mostly Black scientific organization in the United States.

== Symbols ==
The motto of Beta Kappa Chi is ''Science holds the Golden Key to the Royal Palace of Knowledge''. The meaning of the Greek letters Beta Kappa Chi are only known to the society's members, but represent its motto. Its colors are golden yellow and royal blue.

The Beta Kappa Chi key designed by charter member John Martyne Howe. Its key is shaped like a benzene ring with the Greek letters ΒΚΧ and a clover leaf above the Β, a skull and crossed bones above the Κ, and a circle above the Χ. There is a retort below the Β, a balance below the Κ, and scroll with stencils below the Χ.

The symbols were selected by charter members Horace Bond, W. C. Coles, and Adolphus Gordon. The clover leaf symbolizes botany, the scull and crossed bones represent anatomy, and the circle stands for astronomy. The retort represents chemistry, balance is a symbol of physics, and the scroll with stencils represents mathematics.

Its publication is the Beta Kappa Chi Bulletin.

== Membership ==
Membership is open to undergraduate and graduate students. Undergraduates are eligible for membership if they have completed 64 hours of college courses with 17 hours in the sciences, with a B average, and rank in the upper fifth of their class. Graduate students must have completed fifteen hours in the sciences with a mix of As and Bs.

== Activities ==
Beta Kappa Chi has an annual national convention that includes research presentations by its members. This meeting is held in conjunction with the National Institute of Science in Washington, D.C. In 2017, it held a joint annual meeting with the National Institute of Allergy and Infectious Diseases and the National Institute of Science.

== Chapters ==
As of 2024, Beta Kappa Chi honor society has 67 active chapters across the United States. Chapters were assigned Greek letter names in alphabetical order until 1950; at that time Greek letter names were abolished and all chapters were named by their host institution.

== Notable members ==
- Horace Mann Bond (Alpha), president of Fort Valley State College and father of civil-rights leader Julian Bond
- Ulysses Grant Dailey (Alpha), surgeon and president of the National Medical Association
- Harold Fetter Grimm (Alpha honorary), head of the department of biology and dean for fifty years at Lincoln University
- Mary Elliott Hill, one of the earliest African-American women to become a chemist
- Robert S. Jason (Alpha), head of the department of pathology at the Howard University College of Medicine
- Lynda Marie Jordan, biochemist and associate professor of chemistry at North Carolina A&T State University
- Angie Turner King, professor of chemistry and mathematics at West Virginia State College
- Evelyn Nicol, immunologist, microbiologist, and the first to isolate the herpes zoster virus
- E. E. O'Banion, chairman of the chemistry department and director of the natural sciences department at Prairie View A&M University from the 1940s to the 1970s
- Joseph Alphonso Pierce, mathematician and statistician
- Hildrus Poindexter (Alpha), bacteriologist, pioneer in tropical medicine, and head of the department of preventative medicine, bacteriology, and public health at the Howard University College of Medicine
- Johnnie Hines Watts Prothro, professor at the Tuskegee Institute, University of Connecticut at Storrs, and Georgia State University
- Carl Glennis Roberts (Alpha), one of the first African Americans to be elected to the American College of Surgeons and a president of the National Medical Association
- Gladys W. Royal, early African-American biochemist
- Alberta Jones Seaton, professor of biology at Texas Southern University and the first African-American women awarded a doctorate in zoology
- Jerome Singleton, Paralympic athlete
- Frederick D. Stubbs (Alpha), thoracic surgeon in Philadelphia, Pennsylvania
- Louise Nixon Sutton, first chair of the Department of Physical Sciences and Mathematics at Elizabeth City State University
- Thyrsa Frazier Svager, head of the Department of Mathematics at Central State University
- Thomas Wyatt Turner (Alpha honorary), botanist, head of the department of natural sciences at Howard University, first Black American to receive a Ph.D. in botany, and helped found the NAACP and the Federated Colored Catholics
- Levi Watkins, heart surgeon who was the first to successfully implant an automatic defibrillator in a human patient
- I. J. K. Wells (Alpha), state supervisor of Negro schools for West Virginia
- Michael Duryea Williams, professor at Clark Atlanta University
- James Edward Young, professor physics at Massachusetts Institute of Technology

== See also ==
- Honor cords
