= Johnnie Hines Watts Prothro =

American nutritionist

- Born: Johnnie Hines Watts; February 28, 1922; Atlanta, Georgia
- Died: June 6, 2009 (aged 87); Decatur, Georgia
- Education: Spelman College; Columbia University; University of Chicago
- Occupation: Nutritionist
- Spouse: Charles E. Prothro

Johnnie Hines Watts Prothro (February 28, 1922 – June 6, 2009) was an American nutritionist in the Southern United States whose career spanned the eras of racial segregation, Jim Crow laws, and the passing of the Civil Rights Act and Voting Rights Act. She was one of the first African American nutritionists and food scientists.

== Early life and education ==
Johnnie Hines Watts was born in Atlanta, Georgia, on February 28, 1922, in the segregated South. After graduating from high school at the age of 15, she attended Spelman College, a historically Black college, where she received a BS degree with honors in Home Economics in 1941. Her first job after graduation was as a teacher of foods and nutrition at the all-black Booker T. Washington High School (1941–1945). She left this position to continue her education, and received an MS from Columbia University in 1946. After one year of teaching chemistry at Southern University in Baton Rouge, Louisiana (1946–1947), she moved to Chicago to pursue a Ph.D. She studied at the University of Chicago and received her Ph.D. in 1952 after completing a thesis on "The Relation of the Rates of Inactivation of Peroxidase, Catecholase, and Ascorbase to the Oxidation of Ascorbic Acid in Vegetables."

== Career and later life ==
Prothro was both an associate professor of chemistry and a professor of home economics and food administration at the Tuskegee Institute in Alabama (1952–1963). However, due to the sustained racial tension and abuse she experienced living in the south, she and her family decided to move north.

She worked as an associate professor of home economics at the University of Connecticut at Storrs from 1963 to 1967. Prothro later returned to Tuskegee University in 1968 to chair the department of home economics and food administration. During this time, she was also a research associate at the Carver Foundation (until 1980). In 1975, Prothro was appointed as clinical professor in the department of allied health professions, and later concluded her career as a professor in the department of nutrition at Georgia State University (1980–1989).

She was a highly respected teacher and researcher, and a certified nutritionist. One of her students, Bernadine Tolbert, is quoted as saying that Dr. Prothro was "a great teacher and trainer: who had 'absolute integrity in collecting and publishing her research.'" Throughout her career, Prothro received many prestigious grants to study nutrition, including a National Institutes of Health Fellowship at the University of California at Los Angeles for the study of public health (1958-1959), and other grants from the National Institutes of Health, the Human Nutrition Research Division of the U.S. Department of Agriculture, and the National Dairy Council. She published over 20 papers on the availability of essential amino acids from food.

== Awards and honors ==
During her time at the University of Chicago, Prothro received several awards, including the Laverne Noyes Scholarship (1948-1950), the Evaporated Milk Association Award (1950-1951), the Borden Award from the American Home Economics Association (1950-1951), and a research assistantship (1951-1952).

Prothro received many fellowships and grants during her research career. She was appointed by President Jimmy Carter to the Board for International Food and Agricultural Development, the first woman and the first African-American on the board. Prothro was also a member of Sigma Xi, Beta Kappa Chi, Sigma Delta Epsilon, the New York Academy of Sciences, the Institute of Food Technologists, the Academy of Nutrition and Dietetics, and the American Chemical Society. In 2003, she was awarded an honorary degree by Spelman College for her research leadership and community activities. An award in her name is offered by Georgia State University.

== Personal life ==
During her time in Chicago, she married Charles E. Prothro, with whom she had a daughter.

In her book African American women chemists, Jeannette E. Brown explains that upon her retirement, Prothro dedicated herself to "cultural activity, volunteerism and exercise. She awoke at 4:30 every morning except Sunday to walk three miles in the park near her house. She also enjoyed the theatre, tended to her flower beds, and spent several hours a day at the public library reading for pleasure."

She died of cancer on June 6, 2009, in Decatur, Georgia.
