= George C. Royal =

American microbiologist (1921–2016)

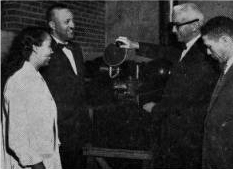
Dr. Gladys Royal (left), Dr. W. E. Reed (left center), R. L. Satoera (right center) and Dr. George Royal (right), with x-ray equipment, North Carolina A&T College, 1961

George Calvin Royal Jr (August 5, 1921 - November 24, 2016) was an American microbiologist. George C. Royal was also part of one of the few African-American husband-and-wife teams in science, working with Gladys W. Royal, Ph.D. on research supported by the United States Atomic Energy Commission. George C. Royal is a professor emeritus at Howard University.

== Early life ==
Royal was born in Williamston, South Carolina, in 1921, the oldest boy of nine children of African-American and Native American descent. His father, George Sr., owned an auto garage there before migrating his family to Urbana, Ohio, during the Great Depression.

== College and early professional career ==
Royal attended Tuskegee Institute from 1939 to 1943, earning a B.S. in Biology before serving in the Army in World War II as a munitions sergeant, ending at the Battle of the Bulge in 1945. After the war, he attended the University of Wisconsin, where he received an M.S. in microbiology in 1947. Royal took on positions as Bacteriology instructor at Tuskegee in 1947–48; research assistant at Ohio State University and Ohio Agricultural Experiment Station from 1948 to 1952. He was assistant professor of Bacteriology at North Carolina Agricultural and Technical College (now North Carolina Agricultural and Technical State University) in Greensboro from 1952 to 1955.

== Ph.D and beyond ==
In 1955 Royal gained admission to the University of Pennsylvania, where he received his Ph.D. in microbiology as a predoctoral fellow in 1957. Royal was associate and professor of Bacteriology at North Carolina Agricultural and Technical College in Greensboro from 1957 to 1965; and in 1959 he served a summer research fellowship for the United States Atomic Energy Commission, Biology Division, at Oak Ridge Institute of Nuclear Studies. He was the dean of the Graduate School at North Carolina Agricultural and Technical College in Greensboro from 1961 to 1965. Following a postdoctoral study in allergy and hypersensitivity and an assistant professorship in Microbiology at Jefferson Medical College in Philadelphia from 1965 to 1966, he joined the faculty of Howard University from 1966 to 1993. He became professor emeritus in 1993.

== Partnership in marriage and work ==
Royal married Gladys Geraldine Williams in 1947 while attending the University of Wisconsin. Gladys W. Royal (1926–2002) was an African-American biochemist, who graduated from Dillard University with a B.Sc. at the age of 18 in 1944, received an M.Sc. from Tuskegee in 1954, and would receive her Ph.D. from Ohio State University several years later - a rare feat for an African-American female in the 1950s. The Royals would collaborate on important research including that funded by the United States Atomic Energy Commission involving bone marrow transplants to treat radiation overdoses.

African-American husband-and-wife teams in science were extremely rare in the early and mid-20th century due to the social, educational and economic climate regarding African Americans in the United States.

== Research ==
The Atomic Energy Commission supported at least five grants for funding research on bone marrow transplants, which were proposed jointly by George and Gladys W. Royal. Their work was written and presented at various conferences, including the Fifth International Congress on Nutrition Washington, DC 1960 and the International Congress on Histochemistry and Cytochemistry held in Paris, France in 1960.

George C. Royal collaborated at Howard University with Dr. Calvin Sampson and others to develop serological procedures having prognostic value in candidiasis; with Dr. Arvind Nandedkar to study antigenic compounds associated with Candida albicans; with Dr. Robert Watkins and Dr. Arvind Nandedkar to develop antibodies to nortriptyline as a method of reducing toxicity; and with Dr. Richard Garden in the department of Oral Surgery to study the effects of Chlorhexidine on the growth of clinical isolates of Candida species.

== Positions ==
- Dean of the Graduate School North Carolina A&T College 1961-65
- Member of the American Academy of Microbiology, 1979
- Department chair, Howard University Department of Microbiology 1987–1989

== Descendants ==
Royal had six children: George Calvin Royal III, Geraldine Gynnette Royal, Guericke Christopher Royal, jazz musician Gregory Charles Royal, Michelle Renee McNear, and Eric Marcus Royal.
