= Lynda Marie Jordan =

American biochemist

- Born: September 20, 1956
- Education: North Carolina A&T (BS, Chem); Atlanta University (MS, Biochem); MIT (PhD); Harvard University (MPH; M.Div)
- Awards: Dr. Martin Luther King, Jr. Leadership Award, MIT 1998
- Scientific career
- Fields: Human enzymes Science education Research & training Infrastructure development Human resource development Theology; Ethnography
- Workplaces: Pasteur Institute; North Carolina A&T State University; Massachusetts Institute of Technology
- Thesis: Purification and Characterization of the Methyl Viologen Reducing Hydrogenase and a Flavoprotein from Methanobacterium thermoautotrophicum, △ H
- Doctoral advisors: Christopher T. Walsh; William Orme-Johnson

Lynda Marie Jordan (born 20 September 1956) is an American biochemist, ordained minister, and CEO & founder of A Place to Heal Ministries, Inc. (APTHM). She was the third Black woman to receive a Ph.D. from the Massachusetts Institute of Technology (MIT), was a Ford Fellow at the Pasteur Institute in Paris, an associate professor of chemistry at North Carolina A&T State University, and the first woman to be invited to the MLK Visiting Professor program at MIT. Jordan was also the first person at Harvard University to complete a Master of Public Health and Master of Divinity simultaneously.

== Early life and education ==
Jordan was born at Boston City Hospital, Roxbury, Boston in 1956 to Charles Thessel Jordan, a meat cutter, and Charlene Veasley Jordan, a homemaker. Jordan was the oldest of the couple's three daughters, and when her parents divorced, Jordan assisted her mother with finances, child care and other adult responsibilities in the household despite her young age. The family moved into the Bromley-Heath Housing Project, where, like the Jordans, 85% of the households depended on welfare to survive.

When Jordan was 11, her mother remarried, and Jordan, her sisters and her mother moved to Dorchester with their new stepfather and his 12 children. Jordan got "lost in the shuffle" and began hanging out on the streets. During this time, while evading a teacher at Dorchester High School who had caught her smoking in the gym locker room, Jordan took cover in the audience of an invite-only Upward Bound presentation in progress in the school auditorium. She describes hearing the speaker, Joseph Warren, ask the assembled group "What are you going to do with your life - hang out on the street corner?" Jordan was struck that he seemed to know her situation. She approached the speaker, expressed interest in the program, applied, and was accepted.

Halfway through her first summer in Upward Bound, which followed her sophomore year and was hosted at Brandeis University, Jordan was recognized as one of the six most improved of the 100 participants. She recalls this recognition as a key moment when she realized her academic potential, and she returned to Upward Bound for the following two summers. During her second summer there, Jordan completed the science curriculum before finishing the program, and Warren hired a private tutor to teach her organic chemistry.

Jordan graduated from high school in 1974. Encouraged by Warren, an alumnus, Jordan entered North Carolina Agricultural and Technical State University as a nursing major but switched to chemistry. She was the president of the Beta Kappa Chi honor society and a member of the Delta Sigma Theta sorority. After attending the Harvard Health Careers summer program, Jordan became increasingly interested in biochemistry. She graduated from North Carolina A&T in 1978 with a Bachelor of Science in chemistry, becoming the first person in her family to graduate from college.

Jordan continued to Atlanta University (AU) where she conducted research at Morehouse School of Medicine and graduated with a Master of Science in biochemistry in December 1980. As part of the graduate program at AU, Jordan regularly took the Graduate Record Examination, performed exceptionally well, and was recruited by MIT to complete a Ph.D. in biological chemistry.

Before beginning her MIT program, Jordan interned at the Polaroid Corporation during the summer of 1981, beginning her Ph.D. in the fall. At the time, the Ph.D. program was composed mainly of men, and only 3% of the students were Black. Jordan co-chaired the Black Graduate Student Association while at MIT, and in 1985 she became only the third Black woman ever to receive a Ph.D. from MIT.

== Career and research ==
Jordan completed her postdoctoral research as a Ford Fellow at the Pasteur Institute in Paris, also receiving fellowships from the French Institute of Health and Medical Research and Chateaubriand. She worked under Françoise Russo-Marie, who had been studying lipocortin, the protein inhibitor of the phospholipase A2 (PLA-2) enzyme, in non-human sources. Jordan successfully isolated the PLA-2 from human placentas, contributing to ongoing research goals of isolating and treating the underlying causes of PLA-2 diseases such as asthma, arthritis and pre-term labor.

Jordan returned to North Carolina A&T in 1987 as an assistant professor of chemistry. She began improving and developing the biochemistry lab there; continued her work with PLA-2; presented her research alongside her students at various conferences in the United States, Switzerland, Japan and Australia; and received national and international recognition for her teaching and support for under-represented groups.

In 1997, Jordan was the first woman to be invited to MLK visiting professor program at MIT, and served in that position until 2000. She completed both a Master of Divinity from Harvard Divinity School and a Master of Public Health from the Harvard School of Public Health simultaneously, becoming the first person in the history of Harvard University to do so. She became the associate minister at the Holy Temple Church in Roxbury, MA and the CEO and Founder of A Place to Heal Ministries in Cambridge, which she established in 2010.

== Awards and publications ==
In 1995, Nova and WGBH-TV produced a documentary series, Discovering Women, which aired through March and April and included a one-hour segment on Jordan. Titled "Jewels in a Test Tube," the segment followed Jordan's life story and scientific achievements. Jordan was honored by First Lady Hillary Clinton at the premiere of the documentary, who cited Jordan's "contributions to science and science education."

Jordan received the Dr. Martin Luther King, Jr. Leadership Award during the 24th MLK Celebrations at MIT in 1998, and in 2000 she participated in the Commemorative Meeting for World Peace in Hong Kong.

In 2017, Jordan published Racial and Ethnic Health Disparities: Building Bridges of Hope through the Holy Spirit, published by Redemption Press, ISBN 9781683144199.
