= Gladys W. Royal =

African-American biochemist

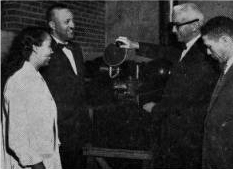
- Dr. Gladys Royal (left), Dr. W. E. Reed (left center), R. L. Satoera (right center) and Dr. George Royal (right), with x-ray equipment, North Carolina A&T College, 1961
- Born: August 29, 1926; Dallas, Texas
- Died: November 9, 2002 (aged 76)
- Occupation: biochemist

Gladys Geraldine Williams Royal (August 29, 1926 – November 9, 2002) is one of a small number of early African-American biochemists. Part of one of the few African-American husband-and-wife teams in science, Gladys worked with George C. Royal on research supported by the United States Atomic Energy Commission. She later worked for many years as principal biochemist at the Cooperative State Research Service of the U.S. Department of Agriculture. Royal was also active in the civil rights movement in Greensboro, North Carolina.

== Family and early professional career ==
Royal Gladys Geraldine Williams was born on August 29, 1926, in Dallas, Texas. She graduated from Dillard University with a B.Sc. at the age of 18 in 1944. She married George C. Royal in 1947.

Royal accompanied her husband to Tuskegee, Alabama, where he taught microbiology in 1947–1948, to Ohio State University and Ohio Agricultural Experiment Station, where he was a research assistant from 1948 to 1952, and to North Carolina Agricultural and Technical College in Greensboro where he became an assistant professor of Bacteriology in 1952. At Tuskegee and Ohio State she took classes; by 1953, she was sufficiently qualified to become a professor of chemistry at North Carolina Agricultural and Technical College in Greensboro.

In 1954, Royal received her M.Sc. in organic chemistry from Tuskegee. She had also taken classes at the University of Wisconsin and at Ohio State University, from which she received her Ph.D. in 1954. Her thesis, The Influence of Rations Containing Sodium Acetate and Sodium Propionate on the Composition of Tissues From Feeder Lambs, involved experimental work in flavor chemistry, testing the effects of various feed regimens on the taste of meat.

The Royals had six children: George Calvin Royal III, Geraldine Gynnette Royal, Guericke Christopher Royal, jazz musician Gregory Charles Royal, Michelle Renee McNear, and Eric Marcus Royal.

== Research partnership ==
In the late 1950s and early 1960s, the Royals collaborated on important research including that funded by the United States Atomic Energy Commission involving bone marrow transplants to treat radiation overdoses. Their work had direct relevance to cancer treatment, which used high doses of radiation and could cause tissue damage. It also reflected Cold War fears of possible nuclear attack.

African-American husband-and-wife teams in science were extremely rare in the early and mid-20th century due to the social, educational and economic climate regarding African Americans in the United States.

The Atomic Energy Commission supported at least five grants for funding research on bone marrow transplants, which were proposed jointly by George and Gladys W. Royal. Their work was written and presented at various conferences, including the Fifth International Congress on Nutrition Washington, DC 1960 and the International Congress on Histochemistry and Cytochemistry held in Paris, France in 1960.

== Later career ==
As of 1964, Royal was actively pursuing her interest in flavor chemistry, collaborating with Arthur S. Totten, Associate Professor of Poultry Husbandry at North Carolina Agricultural and Technical College. Newspapers describe their research goal as removing the "tired taste" from chicken. As Royal had done in her Ph.D. research, she examined the use of additive salts on flavor. The research was supported by the North Carolina Experiment Station at Raleigh, NC.

As of November 6, 1965, the Indianapolis Recorder reported that Gladys Royal had left the Agricultural and Technical College and joined the U.S. Department of Agriculture, being appointed to "an important research post". She became the principal biochemist at the Cooperative State Research Service (CSRS), evaluating federal research projects dealing with human nutrition and consumer use. Royal served on joint task forces including those for A National program of research for food and nutrition (1967) and A program of research for the Southern Region in food and nutrition (1975).

== Profession memberships ==
In 1970 Royal became president of the Beta Kappa Chi scientific society. She also belonged to Sigma Xi, the American Chemical Society, and the American Institute of Chemists.

== Activism ==
Royal supported integration at the National convention of the Young Women's Christian Association of the United States of America in 1961, and was involved in inter-racial civil rights activities of the Human Relations Commission of Greensboro, relating to school desegregation in Greensboro, North Carolina. Kay Troxler recalled her as "one of the most capable women I know". Royal also worked with other women to mentor women students and encourage their involvement in science and other fields.

In 1977, she brought suit against the head of the Department of Agriculture and others for "declaratory and injunctive relief and damages for discrimination on account of race". As of February 2, 1977, a decision in Royal vs. Bergland dismissed the plaintiff's complaints on various technical grounds, "except for plaintiff's claims concerning the failure to promote her to the position of Assistant Deputy Administrator for Family Consumer Services Programs and harassment by the Department of Agriculture".
