= Rufus B. Atwood =

President of Kentucky State University 1929–1962

Rufus Ballad Atwood

President, Kentucky State University
- In office 1929–1962
- Preceded by: Green Pinckney Russell
- Succeeded by: Carl McClellan Hill

Personal details
- Born: March 15, 1897 Hickman, Kentucky, U.S.
- Died: March 18, 1983 (aged 86) Frankfort, Kentucky, U.S.
- Resting place: Frankfort Cemetery, U.S.
- Spouse: Mabel Campbell
- Education: Fisk University (Bachelor's); Iowa State University (Bachelor's); University of Chicago (Master's)

Military service
- Branch/service: United States Army
- Unit: Negro Signal Corps
- Awards: Bronze Star Medal

Rufus Ballad Atwood (1897—1983) was an American educator, academic administrator, and university president. He was the sixth and longest-serving president of Kentucky State University in Frankfort, Kentucky.

== Early life ==
Rufus Ballad Atwood was born in 1897, in Hickman, Kentucky. He attended Fisk Academy and Fisk University in Nashville, Tennessee, graduating in 1920 with a bachelor's degree in biology after interrupting his studies to serve a volunteer enlistment in the United States Army during World War I, where he received a Bronze Star Award. Atwood also received a bachelor's degree from Iowa State University in 1923 and his master's degree from University of Chicago.

== Career ==
In 1923, Atwood became professor (and later dean) of agriculture at Prairie View State Normal and Industrial College in Texas, and in 1929 he accepted the presidency of Kentucky State College for Colored Persons where he remained until 1962, gaining the title of the longest-serving president of Kentucky State University for his 33 years of service. Under his administration, Kentucky State achieved accreditation as a four-year college. Atwood was awarded honorary degrees from Lane College and Monrovia College and Industrial Institute, and in 1962 he was awarded the Algernon Sydney Sullivan Citizen Medallion.

During the 1940s and 1950s when schools were being desegregated, causing the closure of black-only schools, Atwood fought hard to keep Kentucky State open, relevant, and expanding. Five months after the May 1954 Supreme Court decision outlawing segregation, Kentucky State enrolled its first white student. Kentucky State University's Atwood Institute for Race, Education, and the Democratic Ideal is named for him.
