= Carl McClellan Hill =

American educator and academic administrator

11th President of Hampton University
- In office 1977–1978
- Preceded by: Roy D. Hudson
- Succeeded by: William R. Harvey

Interim President of Hampton University
- In office 1976–1977

President of Kentucky State University
- In office 1962–1975
- Preceded by: Rufus B. Atwood
- Succeeded by: William A. Butts

Personal details
- Born: Carl McClellan Hill Norfolk, Virginia, U.S.
- Died: April 4, 1995 (aged 87) Hampton, Virginia, U.S.
- Spouse: Mary Elliott Hill 1927-1969; Helen Collins Hill 1970-1995
- Education: Hampton University, Cornell University

Carl McClellan Hill (July 27, 1907, Norfolk, Virginia – April 4, 1995, Hampton, Virginia) was an American educator and academic administrator who served as president of Kentucky State University from 1962 to 1975, and as the 11th president of Hampton University from 1976 to 1978.

== Early life ==
Carl McClellan Hill was born July 27, 1907, in Norfolk, Virginia, to William Franklin and Sarah Rowe Hill.

== Education ==
Hill attended Norfolk public schools. He earned a B.Sc. degree in organic chemistry from Hampton Institute in 1931.

During the 1930s, Hill taught science at the George P. Phenix Laboratory School, a high school associated with the Hampton Institute. After working briefly as an assistant professor of chemistry at Hampton Institute (1939–1940), Hill returned to the high school as principal (1940–1941).

Hill received his M.Sc. degree in organic chemistry from Cornell University in Ithaca, New York, in 1935. His master's thesis was on The action of Grignard reagents on [alpha], [beta]-unsaturated ethers (1935). Denied admission at the University of Virginia, Hill applied successfully for a Rosenwald Fellowship to complete his doctorate at Cornell. He received $1,500 and was awarded his Ph.D. in organic chemistry by Cornell in 1941. His Ph.D. thesis topic was Studies of ketenes and their derivatives (1941).

== Career ==
Carl McClellan Hill worked as an assistant professor of chemistry at North Carolina A&T University beginning in 1941. In 1944, he joined Tennessee State University, where he served as dean of the school of chemistry from 1944 to 1951, and later dean of the School of Arts and Sciences, as well as maintaining an active research career. By 1962 he was considered one of the top six chemists in the country.

On December 4, 1962, Hill became president of Kentucky State College, succeeding Rufus B. Atwood. Under his direction, the college was formally raised to university status, and renamed Kentucky State University in 1972. Hill also pushed for increased integration, increasing white enrollment at the historically black school. Hill would remain at KSU until retiring in 1975, the second-longest presidential term at KSU at that time.

A year after his retirement he returned to Hampton Institute, serving as its interim president from 1976 to 1977 and president from 1977 to 1978.

As an organic chemist, Hill was a chief investigator, often collaborating with his first wife, chemist Mary Elliott Hill on joint research projects, which continued to focus on Grignard reagents and ketenes. He published more than fifty research papers. The Hills collaborated on textbooks such as General College Chemistry (1944) with Myron B. Towns and Experiments in Organic Chemistry (1954).

== Awards and honors ==
Hill received an honorary doctor of laws degree from the University of Kentucky in 1966, an honorary doctorate of science from Eastern Kentucky University in 1975, and an honorary doctorate of science from the University of Louisville in 1975. He was named Outstanding Alumnus at Large of Hampton University in 1969.

== Personal life ==
Hill was an Elder of the First Presbyterian Church of Hampton, and served on the General Executive Board and Executive Committee of the General Assembly of the Presbyterian Church. He was also active as a member of its Board of World Missions. Likely between 1925 and 1927, he married Mary Elliott, with whom he worked for much of his career. In 1970, he married Helen Ware Collins. Among other activities, Carl and Helen were active members of the Virginia Peninsula Rose Society.
