= Hildrus Poindexter =

American bacteriologist (1901–1987)

Hildrus Augustus Poindexter
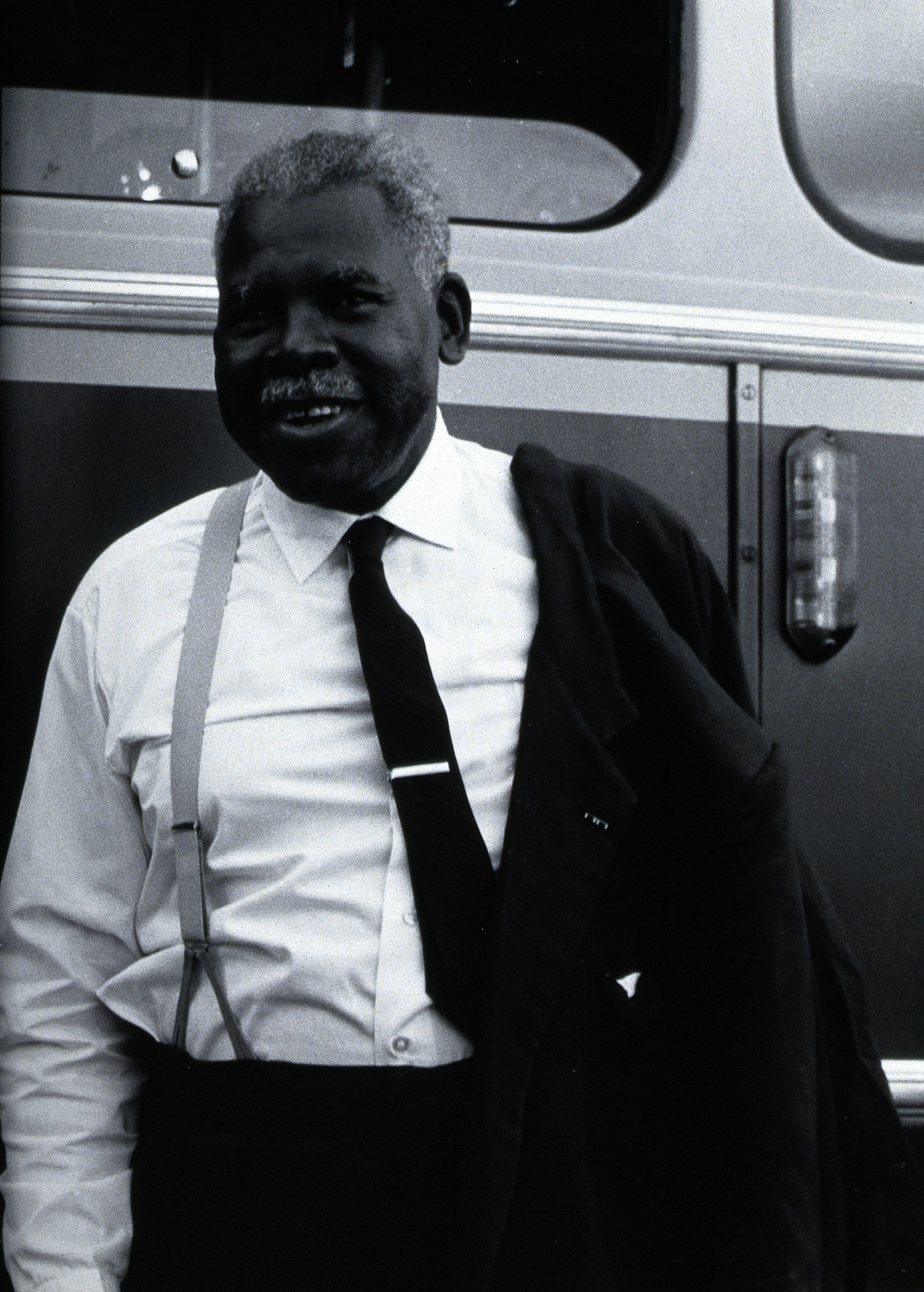
- Born: Hildrus Augustus Poindexter; May 10, 1901; Memphis, Tennessee
- Died: April 20, 1987 (aged 85); Clinton, Maryland
- Education: Lincoln University (1924); Dartmouth Medical School; Harvard Medical School (M.D., 1929); Columbia University (A.M., 1930, Ph.D., 1932, M.P.H, 1937)
- Scientific career
- Fields: Tropical diseases Bacteriology

Hildrus Augustus "Gus" Poindexter (May 10, 1901 – April 20, 1987) was an American bacteriologist who studied the epidemiology of tropical diseases.

== Early life ==
Poindexter was the third son and sixth child of eleven children born from the legal Christian marital union of Fred Poindexter, born enslaved in Kentucky, and Luvenia Clark, born free in Virginia. His father was a tenant farmer and along with his siblings, he grew up learning and tending to farming tasks.

== Education ==
He attended Lincoln University, graduating in 1924. He was one of the twenty-four founders of Beta Kappa Chi honor society. A year later he attended Dartmouth Medical School and then went on to Harvard Medical School where earned his M.D. in 1929. He furthered his studies at Columbia University, where he received an A.M. in microbiology in 1930, and a Ph.D. in microbiology and immunology in 1932. His M.A. thesis was "An Academic Study of Entamoeba histolytica" and his Ph.D. thesis was "Observations on the Defense mechanism in Trypanosoma equiperdum and T. lewisi Infections in Guinea Pigs and Rats." He received an M.S.P.H. in public health and tropical medicine from Harvard in 1932. His thesis for this degree was "Consideration of Four Major Handicaps to Normal Growth and Development of the Rural Negro Child of Certain Southern States."

== Career ==
Poindexter joined the Howard University Medical College at Howard University in 1931 as assistant professor of microbiology in the Department of Bacteriology, Preventive Medicine and Public Health. In 1936, he was promoted to professor and chair of the department.

He entered the United States Army in 1943 and had a very distinguished career as an expert on Malaria and other tropical diseases. He left the army as a lieutenant colonel having earned a bronze star for his work in reducing malaria infections among the troops. He continued his military service as a commissioned officer in the United States Public Health Service. In 1947, Senior Surgeon Poindexter was appointed posted to the Mission to Liberia as chief of laboratory and medical research in West Africa. The goal of the mission was to help the Liberian government in sanitation planning and the control of infectious diseases. He became director in 1948.

In 1953, Poindexter was transferred to Indochina. He went on to serve in various other countries including Vietnam, Suriname, Iraq, Libya, and Sierra Leone before returning to the faculty of Howard University. During his tenure at Howard, Pondexter mentored a number of notable younger scientists, such as Jane Hinton, the co-developer of the Mueller-Hinton agar, and Ruth Ella Moore.

Poindexter published his autobiography, My World Of Reality, in 1973 in which he candidly discusses his various life experiences including dealings with racial prejudice. One example is the offer of membership by the American Society of Parasitologists, withdrawn when the society learned that Poindexter was Black.

He was a member of the American Society for Microbiology.

== Awards and honors ==
During his military career, the Bronze Star was awarded in 1944 and he was the recipient of 4 major Combat Stars. In 1962, Poindexter became the first known Black scientist to become board-certified in microbiology by the American Board of Medical Microbiology and was the 141st person to pass the certification exam. This certification conferred him the honor of Diplomate of the ABMM.

Poindexter received four honorary Doctor of Science degrees from the following academic institutions, including Lincoln University in 1946, Dartmouth College in 1956, Howard University in 1971, and the University of Port Harcourt, Nigeria in 1982.

== Personal life ==
He was a Prince Hall Mason and a member of Omega Psi Phi fraternity. He died in 1987 in Clinton, Maryland.
