= Green Pinckney Russell =

American school administrator and teacher (1861–1939)

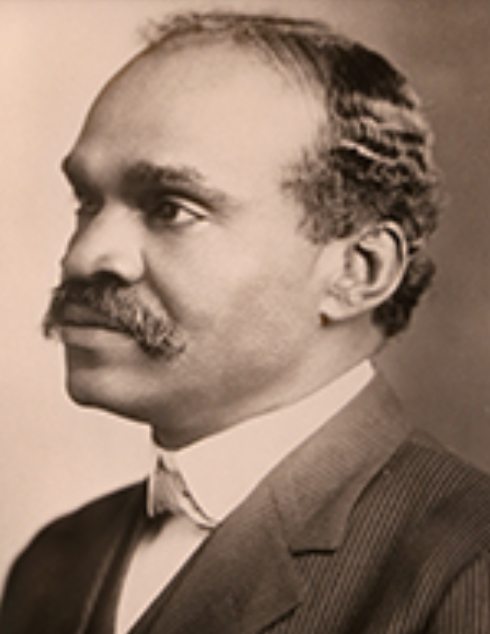
- Born: December 25, 1861; Logan County, Kentucky, U.S.
- Died: October 18, 1936 (aged 74); Waukegan, Illinois, U.S.
- Burial place: Cove Haven Cemetery, Lexington, Kentucky, U.S.
- Education: Berea College; Wilberforce University
- Occupations: College president, school district supervisor, principal, teacher
- Known for: Former two-term president of Kentucky State Industrial College for Colored Persons
- Spouse: Lida E. Willis
- Children: 2

Green Pinckney Russell (1861/1863–1939), was an American teacher, principal, school district supervisor, and college president. He was the first licensed African-American teacher in Lexington, Kentucky. Russell was the first "Supervisor of Negro Schools" in Lexington, and he served two-terms as president of Kentucky State Industrial College for Colored Persons (now Kentucky State University).

== Biography ==
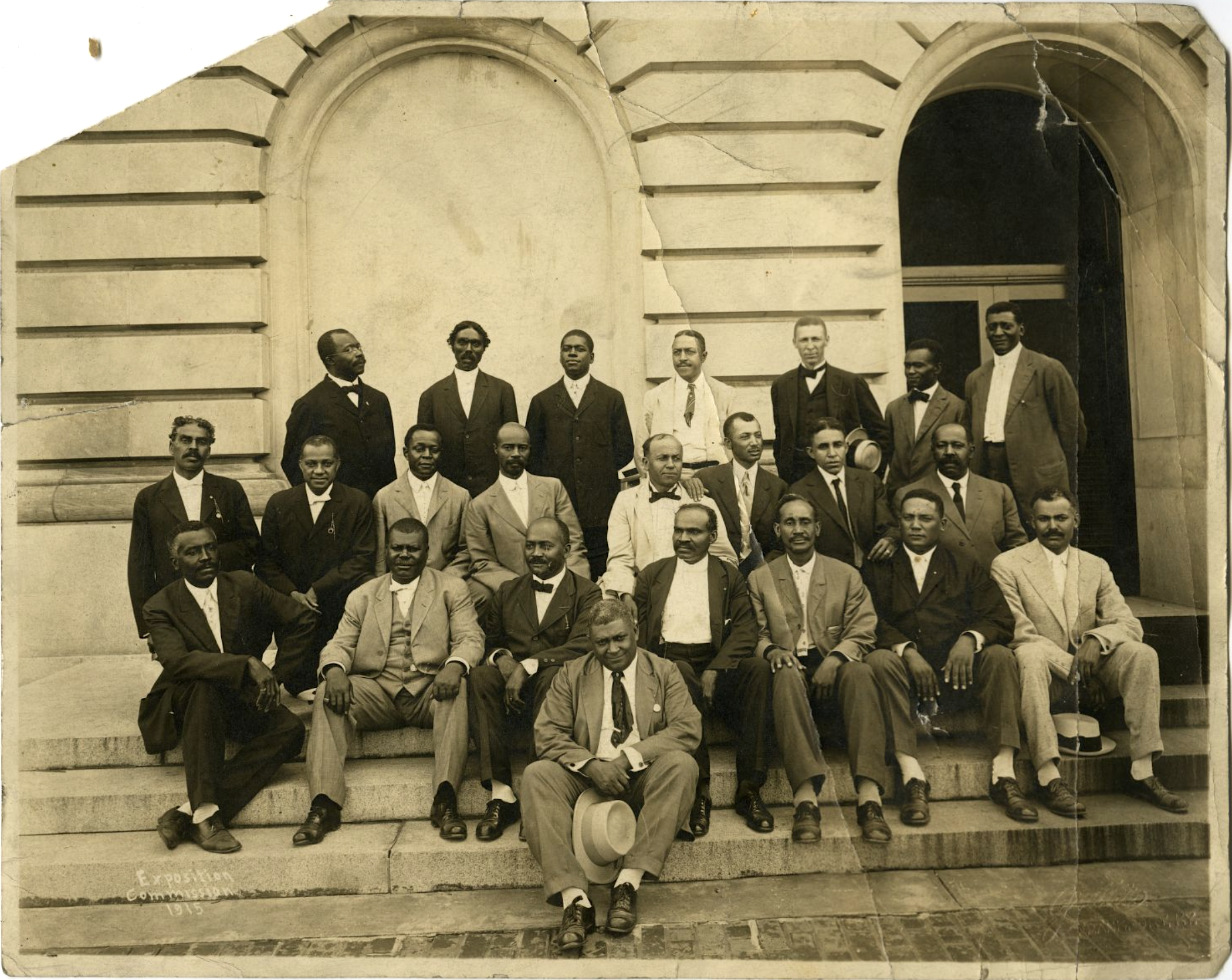
Exposition Commission in front of the Kentucky State Capitol, 1915. Fourth from left in the second row is Russell; others include Thomas Wendell, Anne Butler, and Dr. Edward E. Underwood

Green Pinckney Russell was born on December 25 in either 1861 or 1863 in Logan County, Kentucky. He attended public schools in Russellville, Kentucky, and went on to graduate from Berea College (1885), and Wilberforce University (1913).

He was the principal of "Colored School No. 1." (later known as Russell School) in Lexington, Kentucky. In 1895, Colored School No. 1, was renamed the Russell School by the mayor H. C. Duncan of Lexington.

Russell was the first "Supervisor of Negro Schools" in Lexington from 1896 to 1912. He was twice president of Kentucky State Industrial College for Colored Persons (now Kentucky State University) from 1912 to 1923, and from 1924 to 1929.

Russell lived in Frankfort, Kentucky, for many years. He died on October 18, 1936, in Waukegan, Illinois, and is buried at Cove Haven Cemetery (formerly Greenwood Cemetery) in Lexington.
