= Samuel M. Nabrit =

American marine biologist (1905–2003)

- Born: February 21, 1905; Macon, Georgia, US
- Died: December 30, 2003 (aged 98); Atlanta, Georgia
- Education: Morehouse College; Brown University
- Occupation: Marine biologist
- Known for: First African American to be awarded a doctoral degree from Brown University, first Morehouse College graduate to earn a Ph.D. and the first African American appointed to the U.S. Atomic Energy Commission (Now the Nuclear Regulatory Commission)
- Board member of: Brown University Board of Trustees
- Parent(s): James M. Nabrit Sr. and Augusta G. West
- Family: James Nabrit Jr. (brother)

Samuel Milton Nabrit (February 21, 1905 – December 30, 2003) was an American marine biologist. He was the first African American to be awarded a doctoral degree from Brown University, the first Morehouse College graduate to earn a Ph.D. and the first African American appointed to the U.S. Atomic Energy Commission (now the Nuclear Regulatory Commission). He was also the first African American to serve on the Brown University Board of Trustees.

== Early life and education ==
Born on February 21, 1905, in Macon, Georgia, Samuel Milton Nabrit was the son of James M. Nabrit Sr., a Baptist minister and teacher, and Augusta G. West. One of eight children, all of whom received a college education, Nabrit was elected valedictorian of his high school class in 1921. His brother James Nabrit Jr., also a graduate of Morehouse College, became the second African-American president of Howard University and Deputy United States Ambassador to the United Nations. He was married to the late Constance Croker.

Nabrit graduated from Morehouse College in 1925, obtained his master's degree from Brown University in 1928 and received his doctorate in biology from Brown University in 1932. The next four African-American Ph.D. candidates at Brown University were students whom Nabrit taught at Morehouse.

== Professional life ==
An accomplished marine biologist, Nabrit studied the regeneration of the tail fins of injured fish at the Marine Biological Laboratory where he became the second African-American scientist to obtain membership into the Marine Biological Laboratory Corporation.

Nabrit began his teaching career at Morehouse College in 1925 where was a professor of zoology and named Chair of the biology department in 1932. He later became chairman of the biology department at Atlanta University in 1932, and from 1957 to 1955 was dean of the graduate school of arts and sciences at Atlanta University.

In 1950, Nabrit was a research fellow at the University of Brussels in Belgium. The scientific papers Nabrit published, during this period, remained influential in the field for decades. In 1955, he was named the second president of Texas Southern University where he served as president until 1966. Between 1956 and 1962, Nabrit served on President Dwight D. Eisenhower's National Science Board.

He was appointed by President John F. Kennedy to be the United States Ambassador to Niger. In 1966, President Lyndon B. Johnson appointed Nabrit to the United States Atomic Energy Commission. One year later, Nabrit founded the Southern Fellowship Fund in an effort to assist African-American students pursuing doctoral degrees. He directed the program (later known as the National Fellowship Fund of the Council of Southern Universities) well into his later years of life.

In 1945, he served as president of the National Institute of Science, a nonprofit national scientific organization for students and faculty members at historically black colleges and universities.

In 1967, Nabrit was elected to the Board of Trustees at Brown University. Along with the Nabrit Fellowship established at Brown University in 1985, the Nabrit Black Graduate Student Association at Brown University is named in his honor. In 1999, the university honored Nabrit with the hanging of a portrait alongside Brown's most distinguished faculty.

== Selected works ==
- "The Role of the Fin Rays in Tailfins of Fishes Fundulus and Goldfish", Biological Bulletin, April 1929.
- "Human Ecology in Georgia", Science Education, October 1944.
- "The Negro in Science", Negro History Bulletin, January 1957.
