= Koffi C. Akakpo =

Togolese American academic administrator

19th President of Kentucky State University
- Incumbent
- Assumed office July 1, 2023
- Preceded by: Michael Dailey (acting)

Personal details
- Education: University of Lomé (MS); Ashland University (MBA); University of Toledo (PhD)

Koffi C. Akakpo is a Togolese American academic administrator serving as the 19th president of Kentucky State University since 2023. He was previously the president and chief executive officer of Bluegrass Community and Technical College. Akakpo was the deputy director of the Ohio Department of Natural Resources.

== Life ==
Akakpo earned a M.S. in managerial finance from the University of Lomé. He completed a M.B.A. at Ashland University. He graduated with a Ph.D. in higher education administration with a focus on community college leadership from the University of Toledo. His 2017 dissertation was titled Community College Administrators’ Perceptions of Ohio’s Performance-Funding Policy. David L. Meabon was his doctoral advisor.

At North Central State College, Akakpo worked in several roles including chief student services officer, chief operating officer, and vice president for business, administrative, and student services. Akakpo was the deputy director of the Ohio Department of Natural Resources. He joined Central State University as its director of academic financial planning and management. He was president and chief executive officer of Bluegrass Community and Technical College for four years. On July 1, 2023, Akakpo became the 19th president of Kentucky State University. He succeeded acting president Michael Dailey.
