= James Nabrit III =

American lawyer

- Born: James Madison Nabrit III; June 11, 1932; Houston, Texas, U.S.
- Died: March 22, 2013 (aged 80); Bethesda, Maryland, U.S.
- Education: Bates College; Yale Law School
- Occupation: Civil rights attorney
- Employer: NAACP Legal Defense and Educational Fund (1959–1989)
- Father: James Nabrit Jr.

James Madison Nabrit III (June 11, 1932 – March 22, 2013) was an African American civil rights attorney who won several important decisions before the U.S. Supreme Court. He was also a long-time attorney for the NAACP Legal Defense Fund.

== Biography ==
Nabrit III was born in Houston, Texas, to James Nabrit, Jr., a prominent civil rights attorney, law professor and later President of Howard University. He grew up in Washington, D.C., where he attended segregated public schools through part of high school. He finished high school at the Mount Hermon School for Boys, now Northfield Mount Hermon, in Massachusetts. Nabrit III graduated from Bates College in Lewiston, Maine, in 1952 and Yale Law School in 1955. Nabrit began his career with the law firm of Reeves, Robinson & Duncan, served two years in the U.S. Army and then spent 30 years (1959–89) as an attorney with the NAACP Legal Defense and Educational Fund, Inc. He argued many important civil rights cases before the U.S. Supreme Court and various U.S. Court of Appeals, including Swann v. Charlotte-Mecklenburg Board of Education in 1972, and Shuttlesworth v. Birmingham in 1969. He argued 12 cases before the Supreme Court and won 9.

Nabrit died on March 22, 2013, in a hospital in Bethesda, Maryland, of lung cancer at the age of 80.

== See also ==
- List of Bates College people
