= James Nabrit Jr. =

American civil rights attorney

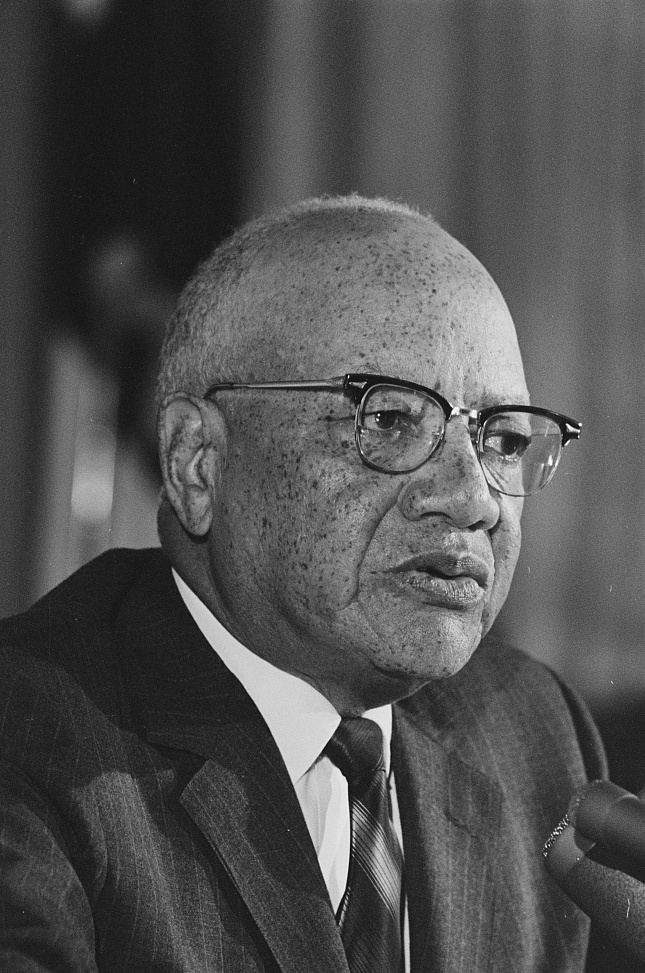
- Nabrit Jr. in 1967

United States Deputy Ambassador to the United Nations
- In office 1965–1967
- President: Lyndon B. Johnson

President of Howard University
- In office 1960–1965
- In office 1968–1969

Personal details
- Born: September 7, 1900 Georgia, U.S.
- Died: December 27, 1997 (aged 97) Washington D.C., U.S
- Education: Morehouse College, Northwestern University

James Madison Nabrit Jr. (September 7, 1900 – December 27, 1997) was a prominent American civil rights attorney who won several important arguments before the U.S. Supreme Court, served as president of Howard University for much of the 1960s, and was appointed Deputy Ambassador to the United Nations by President Lyndon B. Johnson. His brother, Samuel M. Nabrit, was appointed to the U.S. Atomic Energy Commission. His son, James Nabrit III, was also a civil rights attorney.

== Early life and career ==
James Nabrit Jr. was born in Georgia on September 7, 1900, to James Nabrit Sr., a Baptist minister and baker, and Gertrude Augusta West. Reverend James M. Nabrit Sr., a son of former slaves, taught at Central City College, became President of the American Baptist Institute in Nashville, and Secretary of the National Baptist Convention. Himself a learned college graduate, who taught some of his children Latin, Greek and physics, James M. Nabrit Sr. was the father of eight college graduates, and seven who earned advanced degrees. Nabrit Jr. graduated from Morehouse College in 1923 and from Northwestern University Law School in 1927, when he graduated first in his class.

Nabrit Jr. married Norma Walton in 1924—they would remain married until her death in 1988—and taught at colleges in Louisiana and Arkansas from 1927 to 1930. From 1930 to 1936 he practiced law in Houston, Texas. Nabrit began teaching law at Howard University in 1936 and served as dean of Howard's law school from 1958 to 1960 and president of the university from 1960 to 1969. In 1938 he started the first formal civil rights law course in the United States.

== Civil rights cases ==
Beginning in the 1940s and through the 1950s, Nabrit handled a number of civil rights cases for the NAACP Legal Defense and Educational Fund, working with prominent attorneys such as Thurgood Marshall, later a Supreme Court justice. Notably, Nabrit argued Bolling v. Sharpe, a companion case of Brown v. Board of Education.

== President of Howard and later life ==
Nabrit served as president of Howard University from 1960 to 1965. From 1965 to 1967 he served as Deputy U.S. Ambassador to the United Nations—the first African American to hold this position. He returned to the presidency of Howard from 1968 to 1969, stepping down under pressure from the American Association of University Professors after he expelled 18 disruptive students. Nabrit said that he had simply been waiting for the university to choose a successor. He died in Washington, D.C., on December 27, 1997, at the age of 97. He was survived by his only son, James Nabrit III.

== Biographies ==
- Smalls, F. Romall, Kenneth T. Jackson, (editor). "James Madison Nabrit Jr." In The Scribner Encyclopedia of American Lives, Volume 5. New York: Charles Scribner's Sons/Gale Group 2002: 413-414
- James Nabrit Jr., Civil Rights Lawyer and Former President of Howard. In JET Magazine, Vol. 93, No. 8 (Jan. 19, 1998, page 18)
