= Kentucky State University =

Historically black university in Frankfort, Kentucky, US

- Former names: State Normal School for Colored Persons (1886–1902); Kentucky Normal and Industrial Institute for Colored Persons (1902–1926); Kentucky State Industrial College for Colored Persons (1926–1938); Kentucky State College for Negroes (1938–1952); Kentucky State College (1952–1972)
- Motto: "Onward, Upward."
- Type: Public historically black land-grant university
- Established: 1886; 140 years ago
- Academic affiliations: Space-grant
- President: Koffi C. Akakpo
- Provost: Michael D. Dailey (interim)
- Students: 2,020 (fall 2024)
- Location: Frankfort, Kentucky, United States; 38°12′00″N 84°51′30″W
- Campus: Urban, 915 acres (3.70 km^{2})
- Colors: Kelly Green and light Gold
- Nickname: Thorobreds & Thorobrettes
- Sporting affiliations: NCAA Division II – SIAC
- Website: kysu.edu
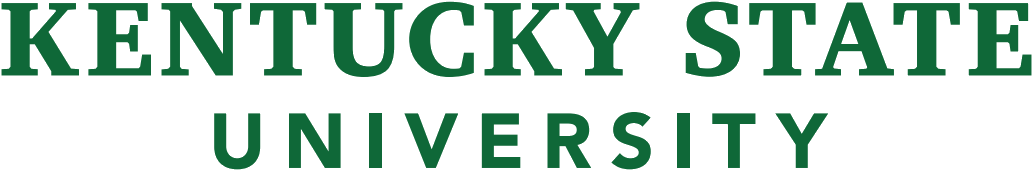

Kentucky State University (KSU, and KYSU) is a public historically black land-grant university in Frankfort, Kentucky, United States. Founded in 1886 as the State Normal School for Colored Persons, and becoming a land-grant college in 1890, KSU is the second-oldest state-supported institution of higher learning in Kentucky.

== History ==
Kentucky State University was chartered in May 1887 as the State Normal School for Colored Persons, only the second state-supported institution of higher learning in Kentucky. During the euphoria of Frankfort's 1887 centennial celebration, the city donated $1,500 towards the purchase of land for a new college on a bluff overlooking Frankfort.

The new school formally opened on October 11, 1887, with three teachers, 55 students, and John H. Jackson as president. Recitation Hall (now Jackson Hall), the college's first permanent building, was erected in that year.

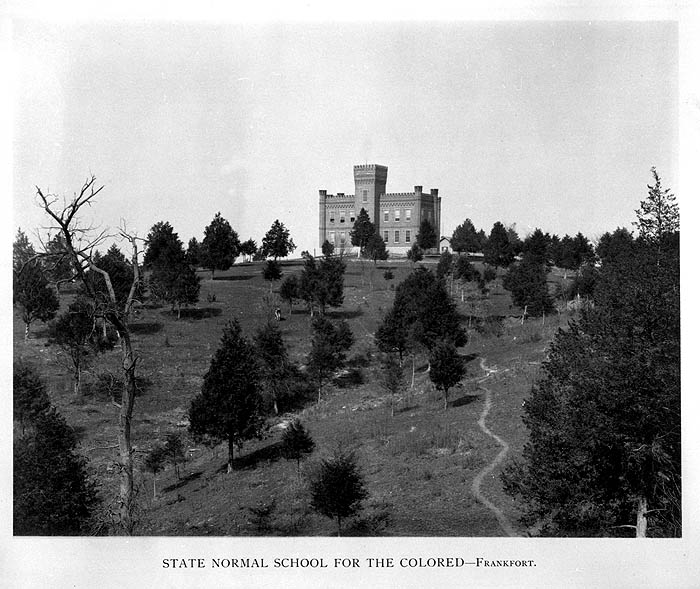
Campus in 1898

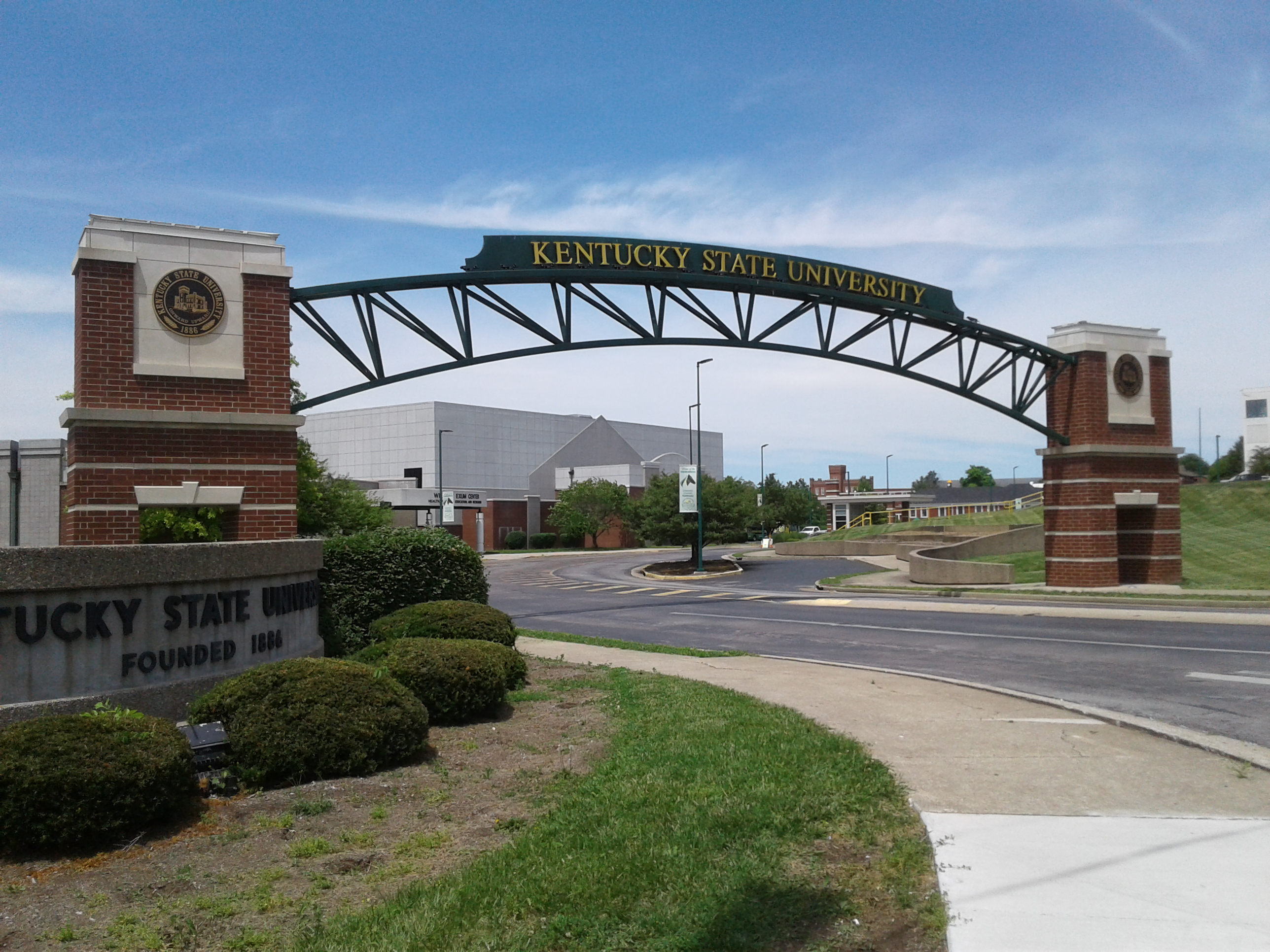
Main entrance in 2020

KSU became a land-grant college in 1890 following the passage of the Morrill Land-Grant Acts, and the departments of home economics, agriculture, and mechanics were added to the school's curriculum. The school produced its first graduating class of five students in the spring of that year. A high school was organized in 1893. This expansion continued into the 20th century in both name and program. In 1902, the name was changed to Kentucky Normal and Industrial Institute for Colored Persons. The name was changed again in 1926 to Kentucky State Industrial College for Colored Persons (KSIC).

In 1929, the high school was discontinued by president Rufus B. Atwood, since students were now entering college with a high school education. In 1938, the school was named the Kentucky State College for Negroes. The term "for Negroes" was dropped in 1952.

The civil engineering program was started in 1942 after the NAACP threatened a lawsuit on behalf of a black student who wanted to attend the engineering program at the University of Kentucky.

Dr. Martin Luther King Jr. delivered the commencement speech at the 1957 graduation ceremonies titled, "Facing the Challenge of a New Age".

In 1960, the first white student enrolled. Kentucky State College became a university in 1972, renamed Kentucky State University.

On December 9, 2025, a self-defense shooting occurred at the university, leaving one dead and one in critical condition. The shooter, a father of a student at the university, was initially charged with murder and first-degree assault, but on December 23, the grand jury accepted the shooter's self-defense claim and decided not to return an indictment. This is the second shooting to occur at the university, the previous incident having occurred just a few months earlier on August 17.

== Academics ==
Undergraduate demographics as of Fall 2023
Race and ethnicity	Total
Black	81%
White	8%
Two or more races	4%
Unknown	3%
Hispanic	2%
International student	1%
Economic diversity
Low-income (Note: The percentage of students who received an income-based federal Pell grant intended for low-income students.)	64%
Affluent (Note: The percentage of students who are a part of the American middle class at the bare minimum.)	36%

Enrollment history
Year	Pop.	±% p.a.
2006	2,500	—
2007	2,696	+7.84%
2008	2,659	−1.37%
2009	2,834	+6.58%
2010	2,851	+0.60%
2011	2,746	−3.68%
2012	2,524	−8.08%
2013	2,533	+0.36%
2014	1,895	−25.19%
2015	1,586	−16.31%
2016	1,736	+9.46%
2017	1,926	+10.94%
2018	1,781	−7.53%
2019	2,171	+21.90%
2020	2,290	+5.48%
2021	2,279	−0.48%
2022	1,726	−24.27%

Students are divided into five colleges, four associate degrees, 55 undergraduate degrees, and six postgraduate programs.

- College of Agriculture, Food Science, and Sustainable Systems
- College of Arts and Sciences
- College of Business and Computer Science
- College of Professional Studies

The university also offers five liberal study degrees through the Whitney Young School (WYS) of Honors and Liberal Studies, which consists of a Honors Program, an Integrative Studies Program, and an International Studies Program. The degrees include Africana Studies and Liberal Studies.

=== Demographics ===
As of 2024, Kentucky State University was host to 1,932 undergraduate students. African Americans comprised 81% of the undergraduate student body.

=== Library ===
The Paul G. Blazer Library, constructed in 1960, houses a collection of more than 700,000 items includes extensive reference, periodical, and circulating collections of materials such as books, videos, microforms, sound recordings, and others, to aid students in their course work and research. It is named after Paul G. Blazer, a strong supporter of education who was the founder and CEO of Ashland Oil and Refining Company in Ashland, Kentucky.

=== Pawpaw program ===
KYSU has the world's largest pawpaw (Asimina triloba) research planting. The research program was started in 1990 with the aim of developing pawpaw as a new tree-fruit crop for Kentucky. Pawpaw is the largest native fruit in the United States and has very few diseases compared to other orchard crops. KYSU is the site of the USDA National Clonal Germplasm Repository for Asimina species and the pawpaw orchards at KYSU contain over 1,700 trees. Research activities include germplasm collection and variety trials, and efforts are directed towards improving propagation, understanding fruit ripening and storage, and developing orchard management practices. Cultivation is best in hardiness zones 5-9 and trees take 7–8 years from seedling to fruiting. KYSU has created the three cultivars 'KSU-Atwood', 'KSU-Benson', and 'KSU-Chappell', with focus on better flavors, higher yields, vigorous plants, and low seed-to-pulp ratios.

== Athletics ==
Kentucky State University teams participate as a member of the Division II Southern Intercollegiate Athletic Conference. The school's mascot are the Thorobreds. Men's sports include baseball, basketball, cross country, football, golf, and indoor and outdoor track and field; while women's sports include basketball, cross country, indoor and outdoor track and field, softball, and volleyball. Kentucky State's main rivals include Tennessee State University, West Virginia State University, and Central State University.

The men's basketball team was national champions in 1970, 1971, and 1972 at the NAIA level.

The Exum Center, the university's athletic and recreational complex, was named after William Exum, the first African-American varsity football player at the University of Wisconsin. Exum was hired as head of KSU's Physical Education department in 1949, and later made head of the Athletics department. He then became manager of the United States Track and Field teams at the 1972 and 1976 Olympics. Exum retired from KSU in 1980.

== Mighty Marching Thorobreds ==
Kentucky State University's marching band is named the Mighty Marching Thorobreds (MMT). MMT has several notable performances including the Honda Battle of the Bands in Atlanta and the National Battle of the Bands in Houston. MMT is accompanied by the K-Rettes danceline and Silk Flag Corps.

== Notable alumni ==
Name	Class year	Notability	Reference(s)
Ezzrett Anderson		One of the first African Americans from a predominantly African-American school to play professional football when he joined the Los Angeles Dons of the All-American Football Conference in 1947. He also played with the Los Angeles Mustangs. He played for the Hollywood Bears in the Pacific Coast League when they won the title.	
Michael Bernard		Basketball player; the first from KSU to be drafted by the NBA in 1970 (Cincinnati Royals)	
Anna Mac Clarke	1941	Member of Women's Army Corps during WWII; 1st African American officer of an otherwise all-white company	
Tom Colbert		First African-American Oklahoma Supreme Court Justice	
Travis "Machine" Grant		College basketball star on Kentucky State University's 1970, 1971 and 1972 NAIA National Championship teams. Played for the Los Angeles Lakers and the San Diego Conquistadors of the American Basketball Association	
Jayjay Helterbrand		Filipino Player of the Barangay Ginebra Kings in the Philippine Basketball Association, 2008–09 Philippine Basketball Association MVP	
Rod Hill		Former professional football player who played six seasons in the NFL (1982–1987) and later starred in the CFL	
Cletidus Hunt		Former professional football player who played six seasons in the NFL (1999–2004)	
Joseph Kendall	1938	Former All-American Quarterback; dominated black college football in the 1930s while leading Kentucky State to a black college championship in 1934; the first person in KSU history to be inducted into the College Football Hall of Fame; inducted into the Kentucky State Athletics Hall of Fame in 1975. He has been a teacher, coach, and parks administrator in Owensboro, Kentucky	
John Kenerson		NFL, AFL and CFL player.	
John Merritt	1950	Former head football coach at Jackson State University and Tennessee State University. One of the winningest coaches in HBCU football. Inducted into the College Football Hall of Fame.	
Ersa Poston	1942	civil service and employment opportunity reformer	
Council Rudolph Jr.	1972	A native of Anniston, AL graduated from Cobb Avenue High School in 1968. In his senior season, he helped the team go to a 9-0-1 championship season. He earned all-conference honors and a scholarship to Kentucky State. In his senior season, Kentucky State ended 8-3-0 and played in the Orange Blossom Classic Bowl game. He was a Pittsburgh Courier Honorable mention. He was inducted into both the Kentucky State Athletic Hall of Fame and Calhoun County (AL) Sports Hall of Fame. Drafted into the NFL in the seventh round, he helped the St. Louis Football Cardinals win two NFC East Championships (1974 & 1975). He retired after playing 6 seasons in the NFL with Houston, St. Louis and Tampa Bay.	
Yingluck Shinawatra	1991	The 28th and first female Prime Minister of Thailand	
Benjamin F. Shobe	1941	Civil rights attorney and jurist who advocated for the desegregation of public education and public facilities in the Commonwealth of Kentucky	
Sam Sibert		Former college basketball standout; Drafted as the 19th player in the 1972 NBA Draft by the Cincinnati Royals	
Moneta Sleet Jr.	1947	Photographer for Ebony, won a Pulitzer Prize for his picture of Coretta Scott King at the funeral of Martin Luther King Jr.	
Effie Waller Smith	ca. 1900	Educator & poet; poet James Still called her "Kentucky's Emily Dickinson"	
Elmore Smith		NBA and college basketball player, who is listed among the top rebounders in college basketball history, starred on KSU's 1970 and 1971 national championship teams. Holds the NAIA records for Rebounds in a Season (799 in 1971 also tops on the NCAA All-Divisions list, as well as being eighth with 682 in 1970) and Career Average (22.6, seventh on the NCAA All-Divisions list), while ranking eighth on the NCAA All-Divisions Career list with 1719 total despite being the only player in the top 10 to play only three seasons. Earned NCAA Division II First Team All-American honors in 1971. A seven-foot center, Smith played in the NBA for eight seasons (1971–1979) and was the third overall pick in the 1971 NBA draft for the Buffalo Braves; listed amongst all-time greatest shot-blockers in NBA history even though that statistic was only recorded for six of his seasons.	
Herb Trawick	1942	First black man to play in the Canadian Football League; played for the Montreal Alouettes 1946–1957 and was a seven-time All-Star; played in 4 Grey Cup Championships, winning in 1949; was inducted into the Canadian Football Hall of Fame in 1975.	
Luska Twyman		Kentucky's first African American mayor in 1968 when he became mayor of Glasgow, Kentucky.	
Davey 'Wiz' Whitney	1953	Former head basketball coach at Texas Southern University and Alcorn State University. One of the winningest coaches in HBCU basketball. Inducted into National Collegiate Basketball Hall of Fame	
Harrison Wilson, Jr.	1950	Became the second President of Norfolk State College in 1975	
Whitney M. Young Jr.	1941	Former civil rights leader, educator and executive; former Executive Director who led the National Urban League through its most prosperous period; served many presidential commissions including as a Vietnam elections observer in 1967	

== Notable faculty ==
- Wilfred Reilly, contemporary professor and published author
- Frederick C. Tillis, educator, professor, musician
- Walter Franklin Anderson, professor, musician

== Presidents ==
As of December 2025, Kentucky State University has had 18 permanent presidents. Four presidents have served multiple terms, with each term counting as a separate presidency. John Henry Jackson (1886–1898, 1907–1910), James Shelton Hathaway (1900–1907, 1910–1912), Green Pinckney Russell (1912–1923, 1924–1929) and Raymond M. Burse (1982–1989, 2014–2016) all served as multiple-term presidents. As an example, KSU considers Jackson as its first and fourth president. This list will following the numbering system as given by Kentucky State University in their "Timeline of KSU History".

The following persons have served as president of Kentucky State University:

No.	President	Image	Term start	Term end	Ref.
Presidents of State Normal School for Colored Persons (1886–1902)
1		John Henry Jackson (Note: Jackson served 1886-1898 and 1907-1910.)	1886	1898	
2		James Edward Givens	1898	1900	
3		James Shelton Hathaway (Note: Hathaway served 1900-1907 and 1910-1912.)	1900	1907	
Presidents of Kentucky Normal and Industrial Institute for Colored Persons (1902–1926)
4		John Henry Jackson	1907	1910	
5		James Shelton Hathaway	1910	1912	
6		Green Pinckney Russell (Note: Russell served 1912-1923 and 1924-1929.)	1912	1923	
7		Francis Marion Wood	1923	1924	
Presidents of Kentucky State Industrial College for Colored Persons (1926–1938)
8		Green Pinckney Russell	1924	1929	
Presidents of Kentucky State College for Negroes (1938–1952)
9		Rufus B. Atwood	1929	1962	
Presidents of Kentucky State College (1952–1972)
10		Carl McClellan Hill	1962	1975	
Presidents of Kentucky State University (1972–present)
11		William A. Butts	1975	1982	
12		Raymond M. Burse (Note: Burse served 1982-1989 and 2014-2016.)	1982	1989	
interim		Mary Levi Smith	1989	1990	
13		John T. Wolfe, Jr.	1990	1991	
14		Mary L. Smith	1991	1998	
15		George W. Reid	1998	June 30, 2002	
interim		Paul Bibbins	2002	2002	
interim		William H. Turner	2002	2004	
16		Mary Evans Sias	2004	June 30, 2014	
interim		Raymond M. Burse	July 1, 2014	October 24, 2014	
17		Raymond M. Burse	October 24, 2014	May 26, 2016 (Note: Resigned over school's continuing fiscal problems.)	
acting		Candice Love Jackson	May 27, 2016	May 30, 2016	
interim		Aaron Thompson	May 31, 2016	May 14, 2017	
18		M. Christopher Brown II	May 15, 2017	July 20, 2021 (Note: Forced to resign over accusations of fiscal mismanagement.)	
acting		Clara Ross Stamps	July 20, 2021	June 30, 2022	
interim		Ronald A. Johnson	July 1, 2022	June 30, 2023	
19		Koffi C. Akakpo	July 1, 2023	present	

Table notes:
