= Deaths in October 1984 =

The following is a list of notable deaths in October 1984.

Entries for each day are listed alphabetically by surname. A typical entry lists information in the following sequence:

- Name, age, country of citizenship at birth, subsequent country of citizenship (if applicable), reason for notability, cause of death (if known), and reference.

== October 1984 ==
=== 1 ===
- Walter Alston, 72, American baseball manager, managed the Brooklyn / Los Angeles Dodgers from 1954 through 1976 complications from a heart attack
- Blagoje Marjanović, Yugoslav football player and manager (b. 1907)

=== 2 ===
- Royal Alexander Brink, 87, Canadian-born plant geneticist
- Lina Montes, 61, Cuban actress

=== 3 ===
- Conolly Gage, 78, British politician and judge
- Frøydis Haavardsholm, 88, Norwegian visual artist and book illustrator
- Nesta Obermer, 91, British philanthropist, playwright and artist
- Elkan Tedeev, 45, Soviet wrestler

=== 4 ===
- Muazzez Tahsin Berkand, 84 or 85, Turkish writer
- Bernhard, Prince of Saxe-Meiningen, 83, head of the House of Saxe-Meiningen
- George H. Marshall, 68, British educator, author, academic and campaigner
- Clara Stauffer, 79 or 80, Spanish Falangist and Nazi ratline operator
- R. V. Swaminathan, 76, Indian politician and freedom fighter
- Osvaldo Terranova, 61, Argentine actor

=== 5 ===
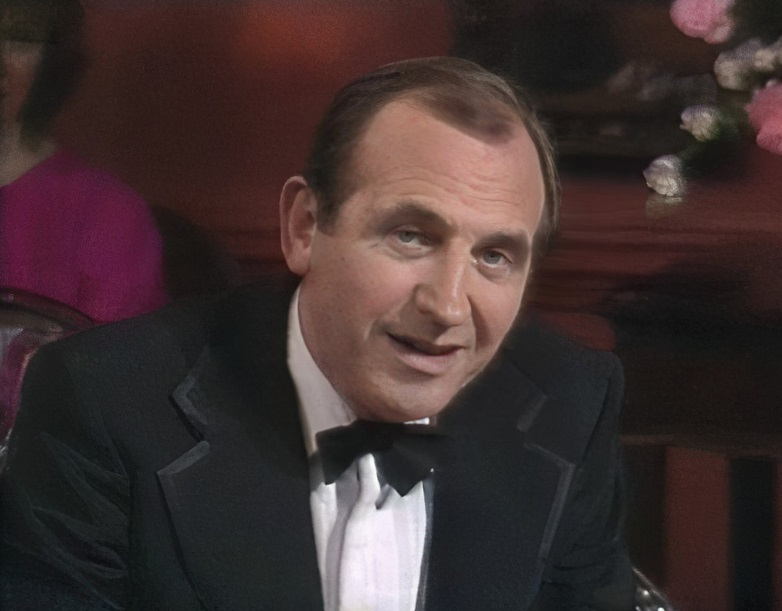
Leonard Rossiter

- Leonard Rossiter, 57, English actor, hypertrophic cardiomyopathy

=== 6 ===
- Carlos Albizu Miranda, 64, Puerto Rican educator
- Charlotte Long, 17, English noblewoman and child actress, fatally injured in a car accident when a lorry crashed into her parked car
- George Gaylord Simpson, 82, American paleontologist, university professor, and museum curator, a major participant in the modern synthesis

=== 7 ===
- Arnold Akberg, 90, Estonian painter

=== 8 ===
- Françoise Aubut, 62, Canadian concert organist, and music teacher
- N. S. Satya Murthy, 48, Indian physicist and the head of the Nuclear Physics Division of the Bhabha Atomic Research Centre
- Theodor Schieder, 76, German historian

=== 9 ===
- Heinz von Cleve, 87, German actor (b. 1897)
- Joan Young, 84, British character actress

=== 10 ===
- Ursula Curtiss, 61, American mystery fiction writer, cancer
- Alan Lake, 43, English actor, suicide by self-inflicted gunshot in the mouth

=== 11 ===
- H. Bruce Humberstone, 82, American film director and former child actor, co-founder of the guild Directors Guild of America, pneumonia

=== 12 ===
- Anthony Berry, 59, British politician
- Sid Carroll, 61, Australian cricketer
- Konstantin Khrenov, 90, Soviet engineer and inventor
- Zunun Taipov, 67, Chinese Tatar military officer

=== 13 ===
- Henry Wahl, 69, Norwegian speed skater and Olympian

=== 14 ===
- Sir Martin Ryle, English radio astronomer, recipient of the Nobel Prize in Physics (b. 1918)

=== 15 ===
- Gary Vinson, 47, American actor, suicide by self-inflicted gunshot

=== 16 ===
- Peggy Ann Garner, 52, American child actress, pancreatic cancer

=== 17 ===
- Alberta Hunter, 89, American jazz and blues singer and veteran nurse

=== 18 ===
- Jon-Erik Hexum, 26, American actor and model, self-inflicted blank cartridge gunshot to the head in a game of Russian roulette

=== 19 ===
- Paul Aigner, 79, Austrian marketing designer, portraitist and painter
- Henri Michaux, 85, Belgian writer and painter (b. 1899)
- Jerzy Popiełuszko, 37, Polish Roman Catholic priest, anti-communist activist, and associate of the anti-authoritarian trade union Solidarity, beaten to death by three Security Police officers who were trying to kidnap him
- Jin Yuelin, Chinese philosopher (b. 1895)

=== 20 ===
- Carl Ferdinand Cori, 87, Czech-American biochemist, recipient of the Nobel Prize in Physiology or Medicine (b. 1896)
- Paul Dirac, 82, English theoretical physicist and mathematician, co-founder of quantum mechanics
- Julian Mayfield, 56, American novelist, playwright, autobiographer, and university professor, editor-in-chief of the magazine African Review, cardiac arrest

=== 21 ===
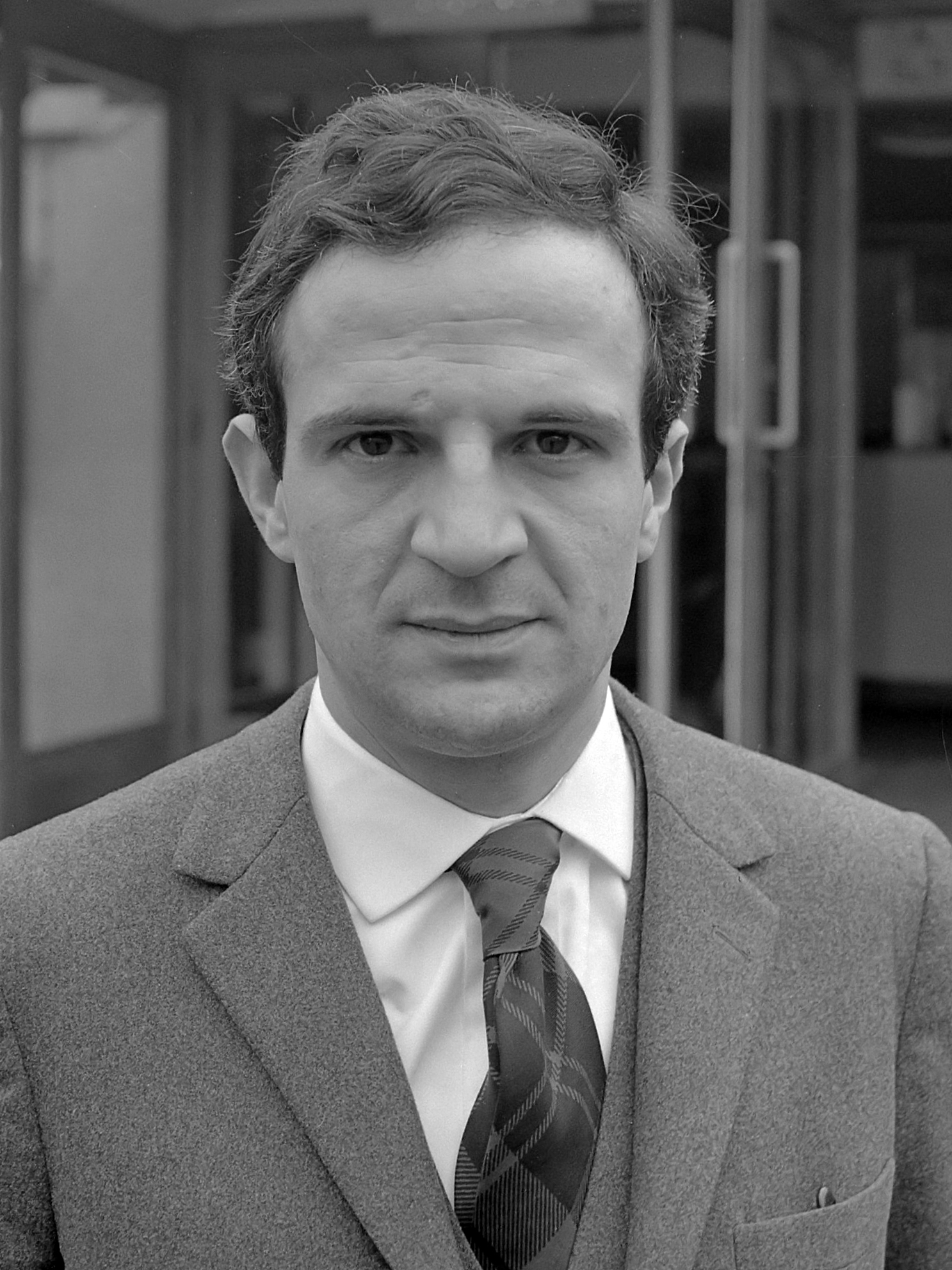
François Truffaut

- François Truffaut, 52, French filmmaker, actor, and critic, co-founder of the art movement French New Wave, brain tumour

=== 22 ===
- Napoleon Whiting, 74, American character actor

=== 23 ===
- David Gorcey, 63, American actor, member of the Bowery Boys and the East Side Kids, founder of a halfway house dedicated to helping people with substance abuse problems, complications of diabetes
- Oskar Werner, 61, Austrian actor, heart attack

=== 24 ===
- Edith Massey, 66, American actress and punk rock singer, member of the Dreamlanders and Edie and the Eggs, complications of lymphoma and diabetes

=== 25 ===
- Pascale Ogier, French actress (b. 1958)

=== 26 ===
- Sue Randall, 49, American television actress, lung cancer and larynx cancer

=== 27 ===
- Helen Rosenau, 84, German-born British academic, feminist, and historian of art and architecture

=== 28 ===
- John Crawford, 74, Australian agricultural economist
- Tomiteau Finau, 59, Tongan civil servant, lawyer and politician
- Albino Lucatello, 57, Italian painter

=== 29 ===
- Jacques Adnet, 84, French art deco modernist designer, architect and interior designer
- Soo Yong, 80, Chinese-American actress

=== 30 ===
- June Duprez, 66, English actress
- Mario Gallo, 61, American actor, liver cancer

=== 31 ===
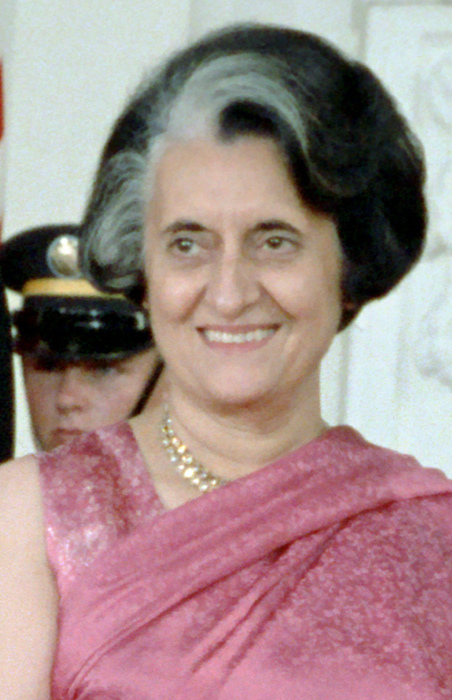
Indira Gandhi

- Eduardo De Filippo, 84, Italian actor, director, screenwriter, and playwright, kidney failure
- Indira Gandhi, 66, Indian politician, Prime Minister of India, her cumulative tenure of 15 years and 350 days makes her the second-longest-serving Indian prime minister, assassinated by two of her own bodyguards
