= Anita Thompson Dickinson Reynolds =

American actress

Anita Reynolds
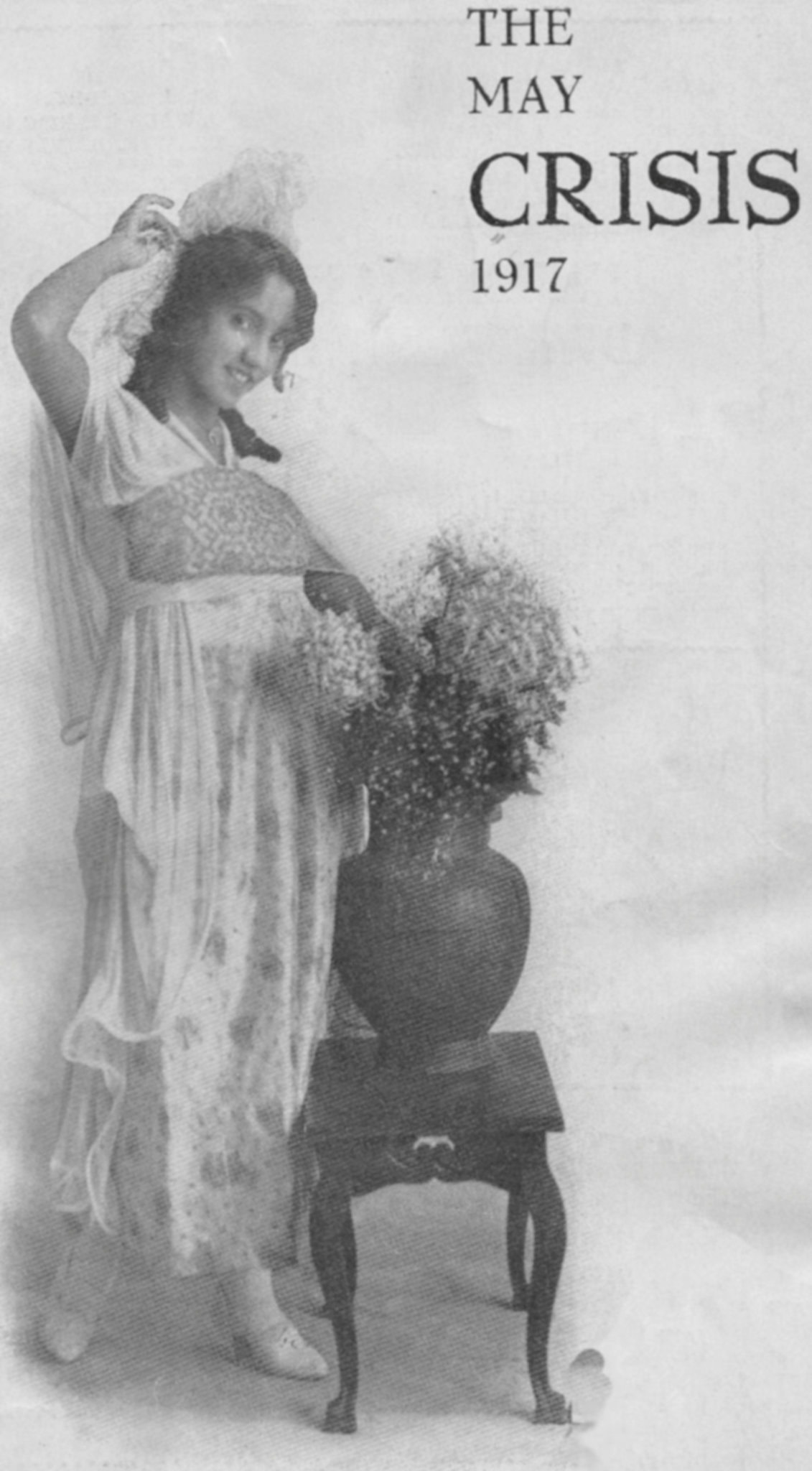
- Anita Reynolds, at 16, on the cover of the N.A.A.C.P. magazine
- Born: Anita Beatrice Thompson; March 28, 1901; Chicago, Illinois
- Died: December 1980 (aged 79); St. Croix, United States Virgin Islands
- Occupations: Model, dancer, actress
- Years active: 1920s-1980
- Spouses: Dwight Lloyd Dickinson; Guy Oliver Reynolds

Anita Reynolds (née Thompson, formerly Dickinson; March 28, 1901 – December 1980) was an African American model, dancer, and actress. She was one of the first African-American stars of silent film.

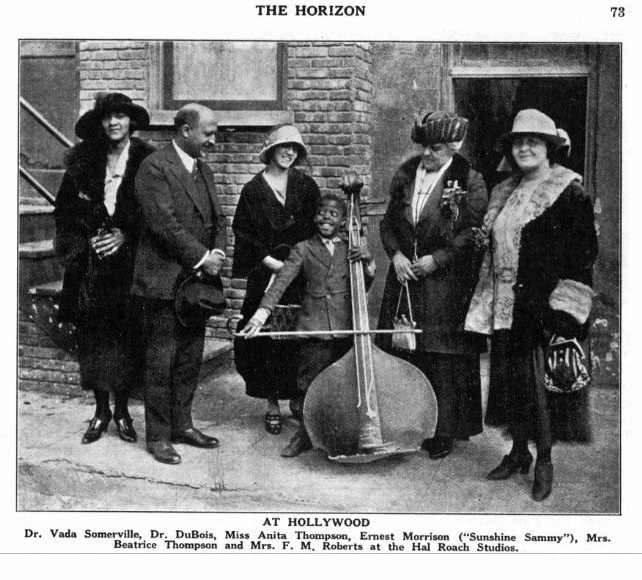
Beatrice Sumner Thompson with W. E. B. Du Bois, daughter Anita, Ernie Morrison and Vada Somerville, in Hollywood in 1923.

== Life ==
Anita Beatrice Thompson was born in Chicago on March 28, 1901, into a politically engaged middle-class African-American family. She grew up in Los Angeles, California where her mother Beatrice Thompson was active in the NAACP including as chapter President. Her father was Samuel Thompson, a Pullman Porter and jewelry wholesale agent. Her nearest uncle was Los Angeles newsman Noah Thompson, whose wife was Eloise Bibb Thompson. Another uncle was business efficiency consultant C. Bertrand Thompson.

== Career ==
Reynolds is considered one of the first Black stars of silent film. In early-1920s Hollywood, she studied dance with Ruth St. Denis, played an Arab servant girl in The Thief of Bagdad and starred in one of the earliest Black-produced films, By Right of Birth, in 1921, about a Black girl whose adoptive white parents conceal her racial origins.

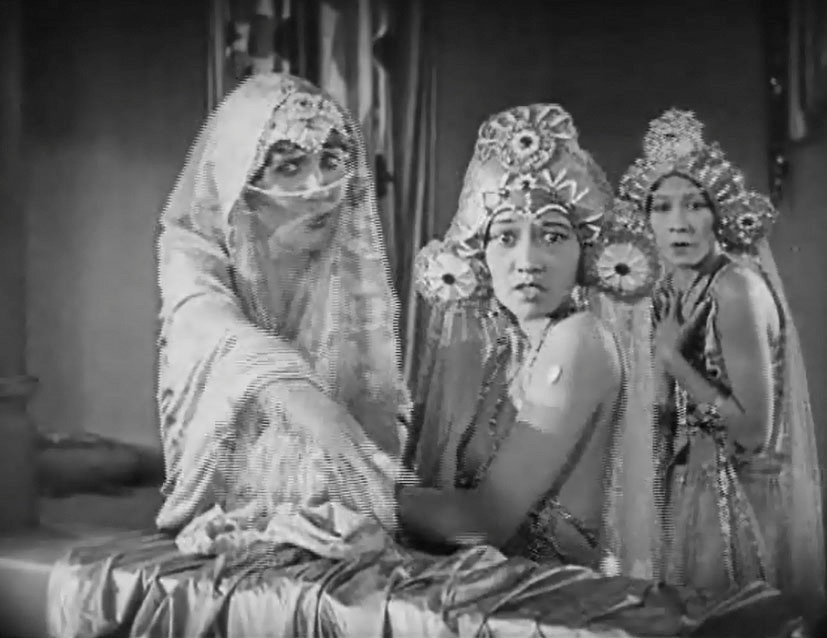
Anita Reynolds as an Arab servant girl in The Thief of Bagdad, a 1924 film.

Moving on from acting, Reynolds circulated international artistic circles and in the fashion scene, finding a career in modeling. In the early 30s she was involved with Claude McKay and lived with him for a time in a village outside Tangiers. In the 1930s, she modeled clothes for the famous French designer Coco Chanel.

== Personal life ==
She worked as a nurse in France between the wars and left immediately after the Nazi occupation. Upon her return to the United States, she studied to be a psychologist. Reynolds was also a teacher and art instructor. Among her side activities was the making of artisanal scarves and handbags. Her memoirs “American Cocktail: A ‘Colored Girl’ in the World” were published by Harvard University Press in January 2014, based on notes in interviews by Howard Miller and edited by Cornell University professor George B. Hutchinson. She was married first in France and Morocco to a White Englishman Dwight Lloyd Dickinson. She was then married later in her life in St. Croix, United States Virgin Islands, to a White American, Guy Oliver Reynolds.

== "Passing" in Hollywood ==
Reynolds racially ambiguous appearance enabled her to navigate 1920s-1940s Hollywood more easily than her darker-skinned counterparts. Reynolds never actively denied her racial identity, but allowed lovers and others to see her variously as American Indian, East Indian, "high yaller", "wild baby", "part Cherokee", "brown-skinned", "yellow peril" or "sugar cane". She called herself an "American Cocktail".

Reynolds moved between Greenwich Village and the clubs and salons of Harlem. She later moved to Paris and then to an expatriate colony in Morocco, leaving several unfinished writing projects. Her acquaintances included: James Joyce, Ernest Hemingway, Paul Bowles, Gertrude Stein, E. E. Cummings, Pablo Picasso and Coco Chanel.

Most of my contemporaries, both black and white, have had chiefly tales of woe tell. I feel a little guilty saying how much fun I have had being a colored girl in the twentieth century.
