= Barbara Zuber =

American artist (1926–2019)

Barbara Johnson Zuber
- Born: Barbara Johnson; June 20, 1926; Philadelphia, Pennsylvania, US
- Died: November 19, 2019 (aged 93); Guilderland, New York, US
- Education: Art Students League of New York; New York University; Yale University
- Spouse: Paul B. Zuber
- Patrons: Walter Slezak

Barbara Zuber (1926 – 2019) was an American painter and illustrator. She was the first African American woman to graduate with a Bachelor of Fine Arts from Yale University. Her work focused on the daily life of African Americans. She contributed the art to Brown is a Beautiful Color and has exhibited her work at the Indianapolis Museum of Art, Gibbes Museum of Art, and the Montgomery Museum of Fine Arts.

== Early life and education ==
Barbara Zuber was born in Philadelphia, Pennsylvania on June 20, 1926. Her parents were Marion H. and J. Warwick Johnson. She was raised in New York City, where she attended the Little Red School House and graduated from Walden School. She had an interest in visual arts as a child. She attended Yale School of Art and was the first African American woman to earn a Bachelor of Fine Arts from the school. She attended New York University and the Art Students League of New York.

== Career ==
After graduation, she taught art in schools, community centers, and at Harlem Hospital's Child Psychiatry Department. In 1969, she illustrated Jean Carey Bond's Brown is a Beautiful Color.

In 1999, Zuber contributed a painting to New York State's The Adoption Album: Our Children, Our Families and designed the cover art for Augsburg Fortress' This Far by Faith: An African American Resource for Worship. Zuber was recognized by the New York State Senate for her contributions to the visual arts and African American art.

Her work was published in Ebony and Jet. Her work is held in the collections of Johnson Publishing Company. Walter Slezak was a patron.

== Personal life ==
Zuber was married to civil rights attorney and Rensselaer Polytechinic Institute professor Paul B. Zuber. The couple lived briefly in Croton, New York, followed by Troy, New York, when Paul became the first tenured African American professor at Rensselaer Polytechnic Institute. Zuber had two children with Paul. She served as President of the Troy YWCA and was a board member of the Troy Boys & Girls Club and Black Dimensions in Art. Zuber died on August 27, 2019, at Our Lady of Mercy Life Center in Guilderland, New York. She was interred at Albany Rural Cemetery.

== Legacy ==
A scholarship is offered in her and Paul Zuber's name at Rensselaer Polytechnic Institute.

== Notable exhibitions ==
- 1970: 15 Afro-American Women, North Carolina A&T State University, Greensboro, North Carolina
- 2000: SANKOFA: Celebrating 25 Years of Black Dimensions in Art, Albany International Airport, Albany, New York
- 2003: Transformations: An Exhibition to Honor Black History Month., Rensselaer Polytechnic Institute, Troy, New York
- 2007: Seasons of Change, Capital Repertory Theatre, Albany, New York

== Bibliography ==
- Bontemps, Arna Alexander, ed. Forever free: art by African-American women, 1862-1980. Hampton: Hampton University and Stephenson Inc.: Alexandria, VA (1980).
