= Anthony Hart Harrigan =

American journalist

- Born: October 27, 1925
- Died: 2010 (aged 84–85)
- Occupation: Journalist

Anthony Hart Harrigan (October 27, 1925 – 2010) was a conservative columnist, lecturer, and author. He was an editor of the News and Courier in Charleston, South Carolina and had a syndicated column.

His father was Anthony Hart Harrigan Sr., a doctor in New York City, and his grandfather was actor and playwright Edward Harrigan.

Harrigan wrote about various topics including Rhodesia, South Africa, Viet Nam, the media, and freedom of speech. He edited a book of collected writings from conservative Courier newspaperman William Watts Ball.

He married Elizabeth Ravenel and had 4 children.

One of his columns was a scathing attack on Paul B. Zuber and James Baldwin in 1964, calling them hard core leftists and Communists while stating that insurrectionists did not "just emerge from the sewers in a day".

He was an editor at the Courier from 1956 until 1970.

The South Carolina Historical Society and University of Wyoming have collections of his and his family's papers including correspondence with Republican Party politicians, columns, and documents related to his family history.

His work has been described as pseudo-scientific racism.

== Bibliography ==
- South West Africa (1963)
- One Against the Mob: With Questions Asked by Prime Minister Ian Smith. Introduced by Alice Widener (1966)
- Putting America First (1987)
- Of the Old School, editor about William Watts Ball
