= Emma Williams =

Emma Williams may refer to:

- Emma Williams (actress) (born 1983), British actress who starred in The Parole Officer
- Emma Williams (gymnast) (born 1983), British gymnast who competed at the 2000 Summer Olympics
- Emma Clarissa Williams (1874–1952), American church leader, clubwoman and activist
- Emma Vyssotsky (1894–1975), née Williams, American astronomer
- Emma Kennedy (Elizabeth Emma Williams, born 1967), British comedian
- Emma "Emm" Williams, a character in Cow (Only Stwpd Cowz Txt N Drive)
- Emma Williams, a character from The Grudge, portrayed by Grace Zabriskie
- Emma Williams, character in Earth Abides
