= J. Max Bond Jr. =

American architect (1935–2009)

- Born: 1935; Louisville, Kentucky, U.S.
- Died: February 18, 2009 (aged 73)
- Education: Harvard University
- Occupation: Architect
- Spouse: Jean Carey (m. 1961)
- Children: 2
- Parent(s): J. Max Bond Sr. Ruth Clement Bond
- Relatives: Horace Mann Bond (uncle); Julian Bond (cousin)

J. Max Bond Jr. (1935 – February 18, 2009) was an American architect. He developed an interest in architecture based on experiences ranging from viewing a staircase at a dormitory at the Tuskegee Institute to views of North African construction styles on a visit to Tunisia. He became one of a small number of nationally prominent African-American architects. He married writer Jean Carey Bond in 1961 and they had two children.

== Education ==
Bond was born in Louisville, Kentucky, to black parents. In 1951, while still a 16-year-old, he began his education at Harvard University, where he was awarded a bachelor's degree in 1955 and earned a master's degree three years later. During his time at Harvard, he was one of a group of 11 black students targeted by a cross-burning incident in front of their dormitory, Stoughton Hall. He ignored advice from a Harvard faculty member to give up the professional pursuit of architecture due to his race, overcoming barriers in what was at the time a white profession.

== Career ==
Bond started his professional career in France working for architect André Wogenscky. He returned to New York City, where he worked at the firm Gruzen & Partners and then at Pedersen & Tilney. In 1964, he moved to Ghana, where he designed several government buildings, including the Bolgatanga Regional Library in an area near the border with Burkina Faso, which consisted of four buildings shaded by a common roof that was designed to provide natural ventilation and make air conditioning unnecessary. He returned to America in 1967.

Back in the United States, he served as head of the Architects' Renewal Committee in Harlem (ARCH) in 1967 and 1968. After that, in 1969, together with Donald P. Ryder, he founded the architectural firm of Bond Ryder & Associates, which was responsible for the design of the Martin Luther King Jr. Center for Nonviolent Social Change in Atlanta, and the Birmingham Civil Rights Institute in Birmingham, Alabama, as well as Harlem's Schomburg Center for Research in Black Culture.

The firm merged with Davis, Brody & Associates after Ryder's retirement in 1990. Bond became a partner at the newly combined firm of Davis Brody Bond, bringing over nine architects to join the nearly 100 at Davis, Brody, which had been best known for its work at Manhattan residential developments at Riverbend Houses, Waterside Plaza and Zeckendorf Towers. Bond was responsible for the museum component at the National September 11 Memorial & Museum at the World Trade Center site at the time of his death.

Bond served as chairman of the architecture division at the Columbia University Graduate School of Architecture and Planning from 1980 to 1984. He was dean from 1985 to 1992 at the City College of New York School of Architecture and Environmental Studies. He served as a member of the New York City Planning Commission from 1980 to 1986.

== Death and family ==
A resident of New York's Manhattan, Bond died of cancer at the age of 73 on February 18, 2009. He was survived by his wife, writer Jean Carey Bond, two children, three grandchildren, a sister and a brother.

His father was J. Max Bond Sr., President of the University of Liberia. His mother was Ruth Clement Bond, his sister was the historian Jane Clement Bond and his brother was Prof. George C. Bond (Columbia University/Teachers College). His uncle was Horace Mann Bond, and his cousin was Julian Bond.
