= C. Bertrand Thompson =

American academic, chemist, business consultant and Unitarian minister

Clarence Bertrand Thompson (1882 - 1969) was an American business academic, chemist, business consultant and Unitarian minister. He was the first African-American graduate of the University of Southern California Law School, known for his work on scientific management. Thompson was the brother of Black newspaperman Noah Davis Thompson whose wife was Eloise Bibb Thompson. Thompson was also the uncle of Anita Thompson Dickinson Reynolds.

== Biography ==
Thompson was born in Denver, where his father, a former Union Navy soldier, worked as jeweler. At the age of 8 his parents got divorced, and he moved with his mother, the daughter of an escaped slave, to Los Angeles. He studied law at the University of Southern California, attending a law degree at the age of 18. At the time, he was too young to practice law. (The minimum age in California was 21). When he later did start a legal practice, it was for a short stint; he soon quit the legal profession "on account of the corruption and trickery associated with it."

After graduation in 1900 Thompson in Los Angeles joined an independent liberal congregation, called The Fellowship, where he became assistant minister in 1905. That year he moved to Massachusetts, where he served as minister of the Unitarian Church of Peabody, Massachusetts and started his studies at Harvard University. In 1906 he obtained his BA in law, and in 1907 his MA in sociology and economics in 1907.

In 1908 he resigned from the Unitarian Church, and started working at the Boston Chamber of Commerce, where he was introduced by Edward Filene. He was an early proponent of the techniques developed by Frederick Winslow Taylor. In 1910 Harvard opened a new Business School, where he was appointed lecturer on manufacturing. He became a proponent of scientific management, and started working as business consultant. With the death of Taylor in 1914 Thompson became one of the best known speakers on Taylors methods.

In 1940 Thompson put an end to his business career, and started to study biochemistry at Harvard and Berkeley. Until his retirement he was researcher in cellular biochemistry at Berkeley. He died at the age of 87 in Montevideo, Uruguay.

== Publications ==
- 1909 The Churches and the Wage Earners: A Study of the Cause and Cure of their Separation
- 1914, How to Find Factory Costs
- 1915 "Scientific Management in Practice
- 1916, Scientific Management: A Collection of the More Significant Articles Describing the Taylor System of Management C. Bertrand Thompson, Ed.
- 1917, Theory and Practice of Scientific Management,
- 1924, Méthodes américaines d'établissement des prix de revient en usines,
- 1925., Le système Taylor (scientific management), C.Bertrand Thompson, Frederick Winslow Taylor

Articles, a selection

- 1916, ""Relation of Scientific Management to Labor,"
- 'The Taylor System in Europe' Advanced Management 5:4 (Oct-Dec, 1940).

About C. Bertrand Thompson.

- Jerome B. McKinney and Lawrence Cabot Howard, Public Administration: Balancing Power and Accountability, p. 147
- "Clarence Bertrand Thompson," in: Encyklopedia Zarządzania
