= Paul B. Zuber =

American civil rights lawyer (1926–1987)

- Born: December 20, 1926
- Died: March 20, 1987 (aged 60)
- Education: Brown University; Brooklyn Law School
- Occupation: Civil rights attorney

Paul B. Zuber (December 20, 1926 – March 6, 1987) was a civil rights attorney who fought against inferior schools for African Americans in New York City's Harlem neighborhood in 1958 and against segregated schools in New York State, New Jersey, and Chicago during the 1960s. He was the first African American tenured professor at Rensselaer Polytechnic Institute (RPI). He briefly ran for the Republican nomination in the U.S. presidential campaign of 1964. He was married to illustrator Barbara Zuber.

Zuber was from Pennsylvania and went to high school in Brooklyn. He graduated from Brown University and Brooklyn Law School. He served in World War II and the Korean War.

He was active in the National Association for the Advancement of Colored People (NAACP) and served as Housing Chairman of its New York State Conference but resigned in a dispute after alleging he was prevented from publicly criticizing policies at the organization.

In 1958 he was a Republican candidate for a New York State Senate seat. In 1964 he sued to nullify Barry Goldwater's nomination as nominee of the Republican Party in the presidential election. Anthony Hart Harrigan accused him of being a hardcore leftist and communist.

In 1971 when he was the director of the Center for Urban and Environmental Studies and associate professor of urban development at RPI, he worked to begin recycling programs in eastern New York counties. He worked alongside RPI associate professor of environmental engineering Dr. Hassen El Bardoudi in Cohoes and Lansingburgh. Zuber also collaborated with the Columbia County workshop for retarded children to service Columbia and Greene Counties, as well as with the Episcopal Diocese of Albany to get their churches to collect paper. He sought to oppose the ivory tower view of higher education and show that RPI was available for finding solutions to community issues.

He had a son, Paul W., and a daughter Patricia Zuber-Wilson. Zuber died of a heart attack in 1987 at his home in Troy, New York.
