= Ana Livia Cordero =

Puerto Rican doctor and political activist

- Born: Ana Livia Cordero; July 4, 1931; Santurce, Puerto Rico
- Died: February 21, 1992 (aged 60)
- Occupations: Doctor and Civil Rights activist.

Ana Livia Cordero (July 4, 1931 – February 21, 1992) was a Puerto Rican doctor and political activist.

== Early life ==
Born in Santurce, Puerto Rico, Cordero lived on the island and in New York City. Both of her parents were professors at the University of Puerto Rico. She attended the University of Puerto Rico, and graduated in 1948. She moved to New York shortly thereafter and, in 1953, graduated from Columbia. She was initially denied a license to practice medicine by the New York State Board of Regents due to her gender, age (23 years old), and place of birth, but eventually was granted the license. The following year she met American civil rights activist Julian Mayfield, whom she married in 1954 . They had two children.

== Career ==
Cordero and Mayfield moved to Puerto Rico in 1954, where they lived until 1959. In Puerto Rico, she conducted a Rockefeller-funded research study to determine how to provide adequate medical care to poor rural communities. In 1960 they traveled to Cuba. In 1961 they moved to the newly independent Ghana, inspired by the leadership of Kwame Nkrumah. While in Ghana, Cordero ran a women's health clinic and served as physician to W. E. B. Du Bois, tending him until his death in 1963. She saved the life of Maya Angelou's son who was misdiagnosed; he had a broken neck. She hosted James Baldwin and Malcolm X (photo in his autobiography). She was affiliated with the National Institute of Health and Medical Research, Accra. While living in Ghana, Cordero and Mayfield separated. Mayfield left the country in 1966, and Cordero was expelled shortly after that, eventually returning to Puerto Rico.

In Puerto Rico she continued her work as a doctor and political activist. In 1967, she founded the Proyecto Piloto de Trabajo con el Pueblo (Pilot Project of Work with the People). This organization combined political activism with standard education. It covered subjects from Marxism to the scientific method. She advocated Puerto Rican independence, and she was one of the representatives of the Pro-Independence Movement to the 1966 Tricontinental Conference in Havana, Cuba after Puerto Rico had been declassified as a colonized country by the United Nations the year prior. She was arrested for her activism in 1968. Her group maintained active contact with the African-American liberation movement on the mainland. In 1978 she was involved in protesting the Cerro Maravilla murders.

== Bibliography ==
- Cordero, Ana Livia, and Colegio de Abogados de Puerto Rico. Cerro Maravilla: Estudio Del Informe Del Departamento De Justicia. [San Juan], P.R.: Colegio de Abogados de Puerto Rico, 1979.
- Cordero, Ana Livia. "The Determination of Medical Care Needs in Relation to a Concept of Minimal Adequate Care: An Evaluation of the Curative Outpatient Services of a Rural Health Centre." Medical Care 2, no. 2 (1964): 95–103.
