= Jean Carey Bond =

American writer

- Born: New York City, U.S.
- Education: Little Red School House
- Spouse: J. Max Bond Jr. (m. 1961; died 2009)
- Children: 2

Jean Carey Bond is an American writer and activist. A member of the Harlem Writers Guild and Black Arts Movement, she has written for both adult and child audiences. She wrote Brown is a Beautiful Color, a children's book that explores a black child's discovery of how his own skin color is beautiful as he explores, discovering things around him that are the color brown. She was married to architect Max Bond from 1961 until his death in 2009.

== Life and work ==
Jean Carey was born at Edgecombe Sanitarium in Harlem, New York City. An only child, her father was Richard Carey, one of Harlem's first heart surgeons, and she is the niece of Benjamin J. Davis Jr. As a child, she spent time in both Harlem and Greenwich Village, the latter where she attended the Little Red School House.

Carey married J. Max Bond Jr., a Harvard trained architect who opened an architecture firm in Harlem. The couple met after Bond had relocated from France to New York in 1960. They married on October 7, 1961.

In 1964, the couple moved to Accra, Ghana, inspired by Pan-Africanism and the socialist progressive political climate. Max Bond became the architect for Kwame Nkrumah and Carey began contributing to Freedomways and African Review alongside Julian Mayfield. She became contributing editor, writing for Freedomways until it ceased publication in 1985. In 1969, she published Brown is a Beautiful Color. In Freedomways, her work explored racial discrimination, black power, civil rights, and feminism. She wrote the opening essay for the journal's issue about Lorraine Hansberry.

Carey and Bond returned to New York in 1967. Carey had two children with Bond: Carey and Ruth.

In 1996, Carey was part of a delegation of African Americans who visited Cuba. Led by Manning Marable, the delegation participated in a series of conversations about Cuba and its relationship with African Americans.

She became a founding member of the Black Radical Congress in 1998. She serves on the advisory committee of the New York City Commission on Human Rights. She is a founding board member of Lee Chamberlin's Playwrights Inn Project alongside Lenny Kravitz.

== Bibliography ==
- Bond, Jean Carey (1969). A is for Africa. Franklin Watts.
- Bond, Jean Carey (1969). Brown is a Beautiful Color. Franklin Watts. ISBN 978-0531016251.
- Bambara, Toni Cade (editor) (1970). The Black Woman: An Anthology. Washington Square Press. ISBN 9780743476973.
- An Anthology and Civil Liberties: the National Newsletter of the ACLU 1992-1994
