= Brown is a Beautiful Color =

Picture book

- Author: Jean Carey Bond
- Language: English
- Genre: Children's literature
- Published: 1969 (Franklin Watts)
- Publication place: United States
- ISBN: 978-0-53101-625-1

Brown is a Beautiful Color is a picture book written by Jean Carey Bond and illustrated by Barbara Zuber. The book was first published by Franklin Watts in 1969.

== Plot ==
The book tells the story of a young African American child discovering things around him that are the color brown.

== Reception ==
Brown is a Beautiful Color received reviews from publications including Kirkus Reviews, The Family Coordinator, Black World/Negro Digest, and The Bulletin of the Center for Children's Books. The book is also cited in early childhood education curriculums, including those from the Education Resources Information Center.

Kirkus Reviews stated in a 1969 review that "While black is the rallying cry, brown is the skin color, here noted as it appears in city and country, in chocolate and cookies and rolls...Coming from two involved, aware Negroes, this surprises by its simplicism; but if it matches your needs, you may want to overlook its shortcomings (trite text, undistinguished drawings) as a picture book too."

The Bulletin of the Center for Children's Books stated in a 1972 review that "The point of the book is not really that brown is a beautiful color but that A - many objects are brown and B - brown people are beautiful. The illustrations are brisk, vigorous, and often so busily detailed that the tight binding seems to push the pictures together. The rhyming text is not without fault...The idea has merit, the message is worthy, the execution is overextended."
