= Joan Cambridge =

Guyanese author and journalist

- Born: Guyana
- Occupations: Journalist; Novelist
- Spouse(s): Julian Mayfield, 1973–1984 (his death)
- Writing career
- Language: Guyanese Creole
- Notable work: Clarise Cumberbatch Want to Go Home (1987)

Joan Cambridge, also known as Joan Cambridge Mayfield, is a Guyanese writer.

Beginning in the 1960s, Cambridge worked as a journalist, including as a reporter and as women's page editor of the Guiana Graphic, which later became the Guyana Chronicle. She also appeared on the radio for the BBC.

Cambridge met her husband, the American actor, writer, and civil rights activist Julian Mayfield, when they were both working at the Guyanese Ministry of Information and Culture. They married in 1973, and a few years later the couple left Guyana and moved to Washington, D.C., spending time in Germany as well. Mayfield died in 1984, in Washington. Cambridge returned to Guyana after his death, moving to the remote Yukuriba Falls in the Upper Demerara-Berbice region.

While Cambridge had worked on a novel in collaboration with her husband, titled Murder on the East Bank, it was never published. She also wrote an unpublished autobiographical novel, Show Me the Way to Stay Home.

Her first novel, Clarise Cumberbatch Want to Go Home, was published in 1987. It was written in a modified version of Guyanese Creole. It is about a Guyanese immigrant woman who comes to New York in search of her husband, who faces difficulties fitting in with both Americans and Guyanese Expatriates. It is considered a representative work of Guyanese literature, part of a new wave of Guyanese women writers at the time.

Cambridge's work was featured in Margaret Busby's 1992 anthology Daughters of Africa.

During her years living in the United States, Cambridge became involved in the Black literary scene, counting Maya Angelou among her social circle. Though Cambridge now lives in the Guyanese interior, she has continued to travel to and work in the United States, particularly New York and Washington. In 2000, she participated in the Summer Institute fellows conference and D.C. Area Writing Project in Washington, D.C., and she has been involved with the Guyana Cultural Association of New York, including performing a reading at their symposium at Columbia University in 2004.

Cambridge continues to be involved in activism in her country and internationally, including advocating in defense of her native language Guyanese Creole and offering 100 acres of her land to resettle Haitians displaced by the 2010 earthquake. In 2025, she published a book of poetry in Creole and English titled Jombii Jamborii in collaboration with Jeremy Jacob Peretz.
