= Arboreto Pascul =

Botanical garden in Italy

Coordinates: 46°13′26″N 13°13′32″E

The Arboreto Pascul is an arboretum located near Pradandons, Tarcento, Province of Udine, Friuli-Venezia Giulia, Italy. It is open weekdays; admission is free.

The arboretum was established in 1953 by the Friuli-Venezia Giulia regional government, primarily to cultivate exotic conifers. In 1974 its mission expanded to encompass botanical education, and to this end its collections now include as many species as possible of both conifer and hardwood, exotic and indigenous. It currently contains about 2,000 plants representing 72 species from 40 genera (14 gymnosperm and 26 angiosperm).

== See also ==
- List of botanical gardens in Italy
