= Beatrice Sumner Thompson =

African-American suffragist (1874–1938)

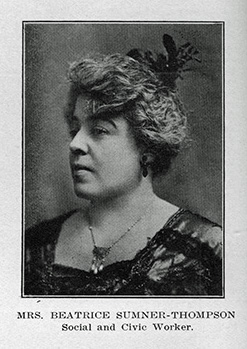
- Beatrice Sumner Thompson - photo from "The Negro Trail Blazers of California"
- Born: May 4, 1874; Boston, Massachusetts
- Died: February 14, 1938 (aged 63); Los Angeles, California
- Spouse: Samuel William Thompson
- Children: 2, incl. Anita Thompson Dickinson Reynolds

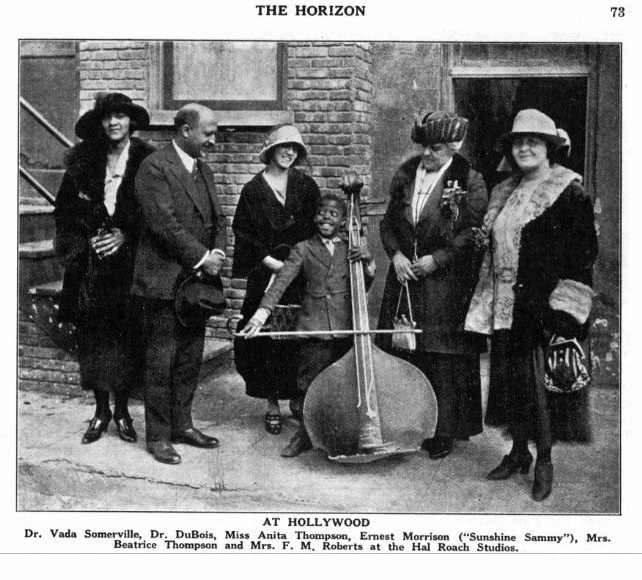
Beatrice Sumner Thompson with W. E. B. Du Bois, daughter Anita, Ernie Morrison and Vada Somerville, in Hollywood in 1923.

Beatrice Sumner Thompson (1874–1938) was an American suffragist and activist. She was executive secretary of the Los Angeles chapter of the NAACP from 1917 to 1925.

== Early life and education ==
Thompson was born in Boston, Massachusetts on May 4, 1874, the daughter of James Beverly Beauregard Thompson and Medora (Dora) Gertrude Reed Thompson. Her father was a Union Navy veteran of the American Civil War, who later worked as a porter and waiter; her mother was in domestic service. Her family moved to Denver, Colorado in 1880. In 1891 she graduated from Denver High School.

== Career ==
Thompson did clerical and bookkeeping work at the Arapahoe County treasurer's office as a young woman.

Thompson was an active Los Angeles clubwoman. She was a member of the Women's Civic and Protective League, National Association for the Advancement of Colored People (NAACP), and the Colored Division of the Los Angeles branch of the California War History Committee. Thompson became executive secretary of the Los Angeles NAACP in 1917 and served in that position though 1925. During this time Thompson was also an advocate for women's suffrage and education for the African-American community, and worked with Eva Carter Buckner, Vada Somerville, Sadie Chandler Cole, and Charlotta Bass in these efforts. She presented a paper at the California State Conference of Social Agencies in 1920. She was active in the South End Republican Club.

== Personal life ==
Around 1900 Thompson relocated to Los Angeles, California with her family. She was there a short time before she married Samuel William Thompson, who worked for the Southern Pacific Railroad. They had two children, Anita and Sumner. The couple lived briefly in Chicago, Illinois. Beatrice returned to Los Angeles in 1905 and Samuel joined her around 1909. In the 1920 the Thompsons separated, leaving Beatrice in reduced circumstances. Her daughter had a notable career as an actress and model. Beatrice Sumner Thompson died on February 14, 1938, in Los Angeles.
