= Noah Davis Thompson =

American journalist (died 1933)

Noah Davis Thompson (died 1933) was an American writer, editor, publisher, and Civil Rights leader in the United States.

== Personal life ==
His first wife died as a result of complications related to the birth of their son. A few years later he married writer Eloise Bibb Thompson. They married in Chicago in 1911 and moved to Los Angeles. C. Bertrand Thompson was his brother. His niece was Anita Thompson

After his second wife died, he married Hattie Upton and they lived in the Dunbar Garden Apartments.

He was a Catholic.
