= Edgecombe Sanitarium =

- African American Doctors

Geography
- Location: Harlem, New York City, New York, United States
- Coordinates: 40.8184°N 73.9467°W

Organization
- Care system: Private

Services
- Beds: 12

History
- Opened: 1900s
- Closed: 1900s

Links
- Lists: Hospitals in New York State
- Other links: Hospitals in Manhattan

Edgecombe Sanitarium was a private hospital run by African American doctors in Harlem, New York City. It served patients "of considerable means" who did not want to be served at the primarily white staffed Harlem Hospital.

Godfrey Nurse was one of the doctors who founded the hospital. The hospital had twelve beds. It was started as the result of the Harlem Hospital having a primarily white staff.

In 1925, the nearby Booker T. Washington Sanitarium was merged with Edgecombe. In 1929, Edgecombe had treated 249 patients. Through fundraising, the hospital installed an x-ray machine.

Gerri Major was part of its Woman's Auxiliary.

== Notable patients ==
- Jean Carey Bond was born at the hospital.
- Eloise Bibb Thompson died at the hospital in 1928.
- Rudolph Fisher died at the hospital in 1934.
