= Camp Unity =

Communist-affiliated summer resort in Wingdale, NY

Coordinates: 41°41′22″N 73°32′41″W

Camp Unity was a communist-affiliated summer resort for adults located in Wingdale, New York. It was one of the first multiracial camps of its kind in the United States.

== History ==
Camp Unity was founded in 1927 and described itself as "the first proletarian summer colony." The camp was located in the Berkshire Mountains near the border of New York state and Connecticut, just east of Poughkeepsie. It was one of several "workers' retreats" founded outside of major East Coast urban centers by the Communist Party and related socialist organizations.

The camp began as an outgrowth of the cooperative housing movement of the 1920s, and its founders were members of the International Ladies Garment Workers Union. In the early days guests were predominantly Jewish, but over time Camp Unity drew a more racially and religiously diverse crowd. It was unusual for leisure resorts to be integrated in the early 20th-century United States, and the camp's tolerant atmosphere and proximity to New York City was attractive to vacationers seeking a progressive environment. Broadway producer and former camp staffer Philip Rose later described the integrated clientele as "almost unique among the major Catskills resorts."

The camp offered a full slate of athletic activities like tennis, volleyball, and horseback riding, as well as games like ping-pong and horseshoes. Vacationers also enjoyed boating and swimming in nearby Lake Ellis. Musical and theatrical entertainments were on offer as well, held in a hall that could seat an audience of a thousand.

Camp Unity advertised a no-tipping policy, on the basis that its workers were unionized and paid a fair wage.

== Culture ==
Camp Unity was well-known for its cultural programming, which included performances by jazz musicians Sidney Bechet, Dizzy Gillespie, and Frank Newton. Organizers offered free stays at the camp to entertainers in exchange for their work, which made it a popular getaway for big-name actors, directors, and musicians. Many of these artists shared an ideological or political affinity with Camp Unity's leftist origins, but not all – Sidney Bechet's pianist Willie "The Lion" Smith later recalled that it was "the most mixed-up camp I ever saw or heard about ... I couldn't see anything in that Communism stuff."

With so many leading artists and performers passing through, the camp had a lasting cultural influence in leftist circles and beyond. The popular protest song "Joe Hill" was first sung at a 1936 performance at Camp Unity, the product of a collaboration between the camp's musical director Earl Robinson and the poet Alfred Hayes, a camp staffer.

The musicians, directors, and actors hired as summer staff frequently collaborated on original plays and tried out new material on camp audiences. The writer Julian Mayfield debuted his one-act play 417 at the camp before adapting the text into his first novel, The Hit. Camp Unity's theatrical staff even toured a pair of original shows to New York City in the fall of 1949, taking up residence on 14th St as the "Freedom Theatre" and presenting work by Carl Abrams, Elmer Bernstein, and Bob deCormier. The productions featured integrated casts and politically progressive themes.

In 1954, playwright Lorraine Hansberry began working as director of the outdoor Lawn Program entertainment alongside her friend and fellow playwright Alice Childress, the director of drama. As part of her work, Hansberry facilitated a visit to the camp by W.E.B. Du Bois and his wife Shirley Graham Du Bois. Hansberry had previously worked at Camp Unity as a waitress, and it was in that role that she first met and befriended future Broadway producer Philip Rose, who was then working as a singer at the camp. Hansberry's play A Raisin in the Sun would make its Broadway debut in 1959 with Rose as a producer. Other theatrical luminaries who worked at Camp Unity included actors Herschel Bernardi and Lonne Elder, III.

== Red scare investigations ==
Camp Unity was among the organizations investigated by the House Un-American Activities Committee (HUAC) during the period now known as the Second Red Scare. This was not the first time it had come under federal scrutiny for its Communist Party connections; in 1930 members of the anti-Communist Fish Committee visited the camp for an inspection. They were met with ridicule and protests from camp residents, who escorted the representatives off the grounds while singing the Internationale.

The FBI informer Harvey Matusow, who later recanted the majority of his allegations, testified before HUAC in 1952 about Communist activity he observed during a 1947 stay at Camp Unity, delivering lurid, exaggerated tales of indoctrination and "sexual immorality."

The camp's entertainment director, Elliott Sullivan, was compelled to testify before HUAC in 1955. He refused to cooperate with their questioning about his political and personal associations, and was indicted for contempt of Congress. That same year, Camp Unity was one of the organizations involved in a New York state investigation into possible Communist affiliations among summer camps and resorts. The committee subpoenaed Janet Moore, a onetime camp guest, in an attempt to compel her to name the individuals who had recommended she stay there. Like Sullivan, Moore refused to name names.

In 1957, two black New York City police officers alleged that they had been passed over for promotions because they had vacationed at Camp Unity. One of them, John Hughes, eventually received a promotion to sergeant after a sustained legal battle.

== Notable guests and residents ==
- Lead Belly, musician
- Harry Belafonte, singer and activist
- Herschel Bernardi, actor
- Robert de Cormier, musician
- Dean Dixon, conductor
- Alice Childress, actor and writer
- Lonne Elder III, actor and writer
- Dizzie Gillespie, musician
- Michael Gold, writer
- Lorraine Hansberry, writer
- Alfred Hayes, writer
- Ellsworth "Bumpy" Johnson, gangster
- Elayne Jones, timpanist
- Joe Lillard, football player
- William Mandel, journalist and left-wing activist
- Harvey Matusow, FBI informant
- Julian Mayfield, actor and writer
- Abel Meeropol, writer
- Robert Nemiroff, producer and writer
- George Pickow, photographer and filmmaker
- Carl Rakosi, writer
- Rafael Ríos Rey, muralist
- Paul Robeson Jr., writer and historian
- Earl Robinson, composer
- Edwin Rolfe, writer
- Philip Rose, producer
