= J. Max Bond Sr. =

American academic; president of the University of Liberia

J. Max Bond Sr. (1902–1991) was an American educator who was President of the University of Liberia during the 1950s.

Bond was born in Nashville, Tennessee, the son of a Congregational minister named James Bond and Jane Alice Bond (née Brown). He attended Roosevelt College in Chicago, the University of Pittsburgh for his master's degree, and the University of Southern California for a PhD in sociology and economics.

He was married to Ruth Clement Bond (née Ruth E. Clement), and their collected papers are held at Columbia University's Rare Book and Manuscript Library. Bond had three children, Jane Emma Bond, J. Max Bond Jr. and George Clement Bond. Son J. Max Bond Jr. was a notable architect, and son George Clement Bond was the William F. Russell Professor of Anthropology and Education at Teachers College, Columbia University. Bond's brother was University president Horace Mann Bond and his nephew was the civil-rights leader Julian Bond.

== Career ==
Bond was Dean of Dillard University from 1938 to 1940, and an Administrator at the Tuskegee Institute from 1940 to 1944. He then ran the Inter-American Educational Foundation from 1944 to 1947, and the School of Education at Clark Atlanta University before becoming President of the University of Liberia, a post he held from 1950 to 1954.
