= Tarcento =

Tarcento Tarcint (Friulian)
- Comune
- Città di Tarcento; Citât di Tarcint
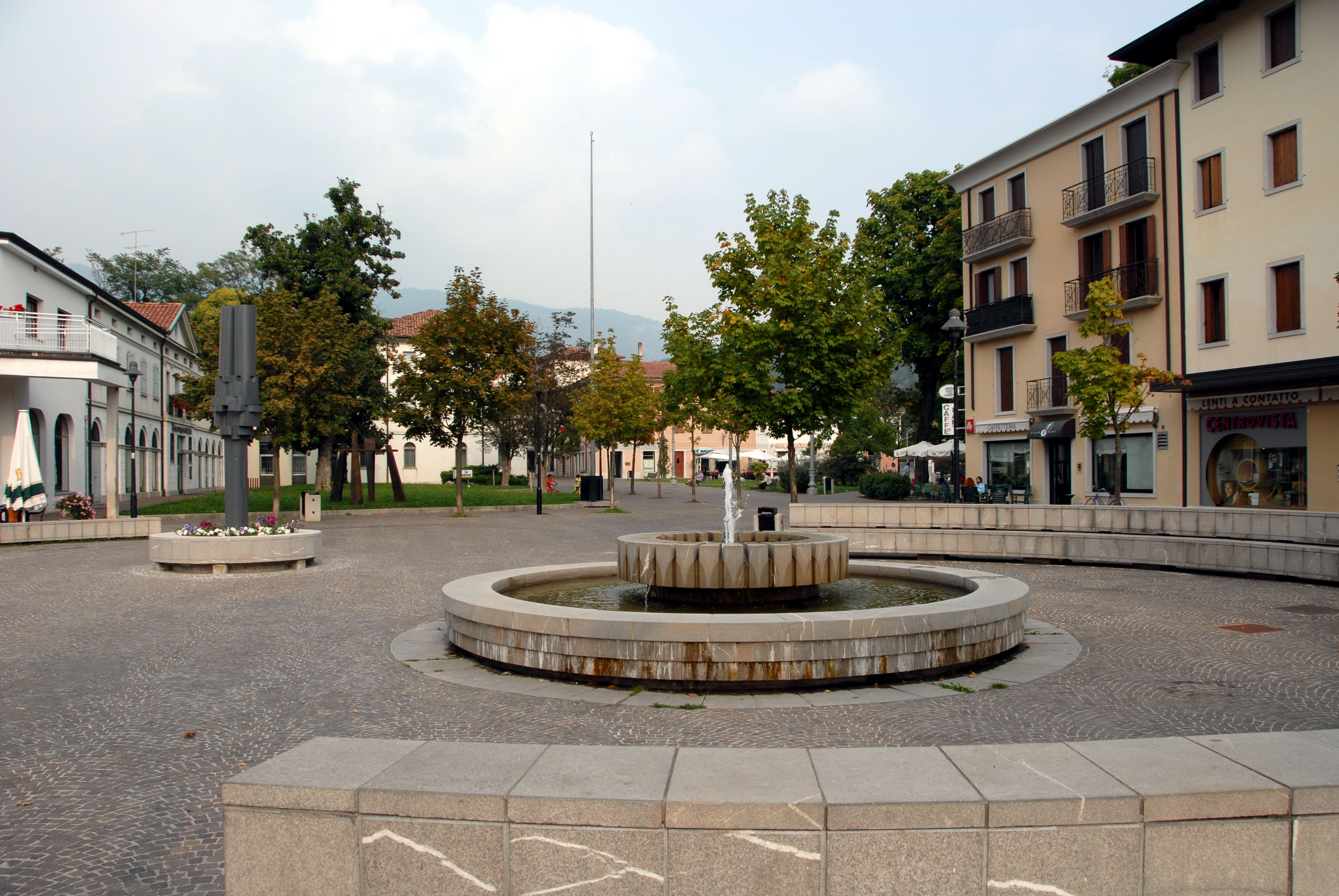

- Coat of arms

- Location within Italy Location within Friuli-Venezia Giulia
- Coordinates: 46°13′N 13°13′E
- Country: Italy
- Region: Friuli-Venezia Giulia
- Province: Udine (UD)
- Frazioni: Bulfons, Ciseriis, Coia, Collalto, Collerumiz, Loneriacco, Molinis, Sammardenchia, Sedilis, Segnacco, Stella, Zomeais

Government
  - Mayor: Mauro Steccati

Area
  - Total: 35 km^{2} (14 sq mi)
- Elevation: 230 m (750 ft)

Population (March 2009)
  - Total: 9,112
  - Density: 260/km^{2} (670/sq mi)
- Demonym: Tarcentini
- Time zone: UTC+1 (CET)
  - Summer (DST): UTC+2 (CEST)
- Postal code: 33017
- Dialing code: 0432
- ISTAT code: 030116
- Patron saint: St. Peter
- Website: Official website

Tarcento (Friulian: Tarcint; Slovene: Čenta) is a small city and comune (municipality) in the Regional decentralization entity of Udine in the Friuli-Venezia Giulia region of north-eastern Italy. The town officially became a city when the local church was given back its rank of duomo.

== History ==
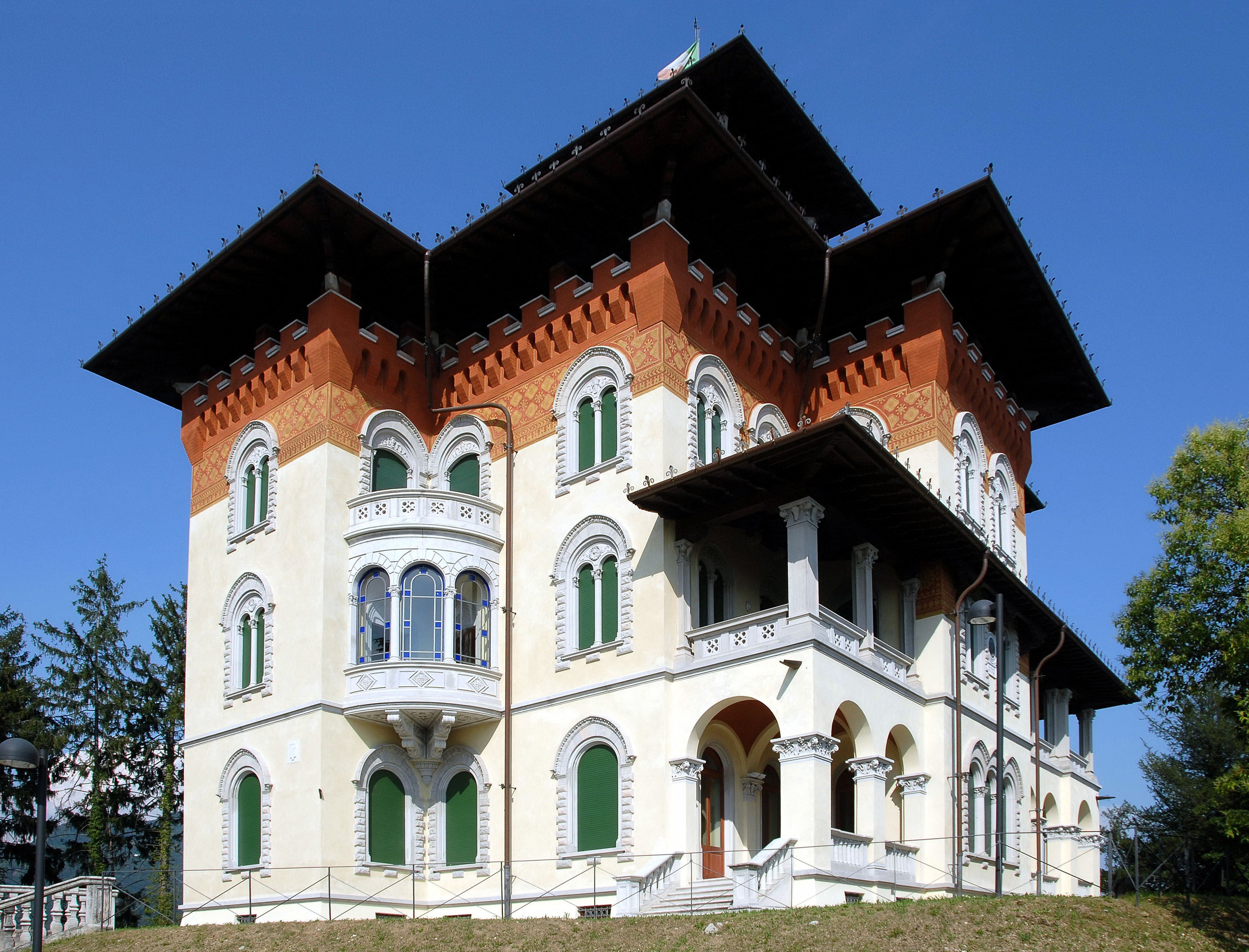
Villa Moretti

Tarcento occupies a strategic location at a bridging point on the River Torre. Archaeological finds indicate a very early date for its first human settlement. Tarcento first appears in the historical record around the year 1126 CE, when an Austrian nobleman, Machland, from Perg, was feudal overlord of the castle around which the town had developed. Subsequently, a second castle was built on the hill of Coia.

In 1219 the Caporiacco family took over as feudal overlords. Both castles were badly damaged during wars for control of the area between the Holy Roman Empire and the Republic of Venice in the Middle Ages, and in 1420 CE Tarcento became part of the territory controlled by the Venetian Republic.

The main castle was burnt down in a peasant's uprising and then damaged by a serious earthquake, both in 1511 CE. Nothing remains of that castle today. A corner of the tower of the castle on the hill of Coia can still be seen.

Following the Napoleonic conquest of the Venetian Republic in 1797, Tarcento came under Austrian Rule. In 1866 Tarcento became part of the Kingdom of Italy.

During World War I, Tarcento was close to the front line on the eastern front. After the Italian rout at the Battle of Caporetto in 1917, Tarcento was occupied by the Austrians until the end of the war.

A catastrophic earthquake in 1976 caused a great deal of damage in the town and its surroundings, all of which has subsequently been repaired.

== Twin towns – sister cities ==
Tarcento is twinned with:

- Arnoldstein, Austria
- Bovec, Slovenia
- Unterföhring, Germany

== Main sights ==
- Palazzo dei Frangipane (18th century), with an octagonal loggia.
- The Parish church of St. Peter (12th century), with a rich Baroque high altar.
- Villa De Rubeis, built in the 17th century over a pre-existing 12th century structure. It has noteworthy paintings, doors with painted mirrors and a notable central hall.
- Arboreto Pascul, an arboretum.
- Cjscjelat, the ruined castle tower on Coia where, each 6 January, the "pignarul grant" takes place, an ancient bonfire ceremony believed to have Celtic origins.
- Villa Moretti (19th century) a house formerly owned by the Moretti brewing family, and now an arts centre, situated on the hill of Coia and since a storm damage in severe degrade.
- Cjase dai Tomâts: permanent exhibition of "tomâts", typical wooden masks handcrafted following an old tradition

== People ==
- Giovanni Antonio Agostini, painter
- Giancarlo Cruder, (1947), politician
- Gian Giuseppe Liruti, (1689-1780), literary man, numismatic
- Ella von Schultz-Adaïewsky, (1846-1926), musicologist and pianist
- Giovanni Marinelli, (1846-1900), geographer; he was 4 times a Member of Parliament of Gemona-Tarcento
- Angelo Angeli, (1864-1931), chemist
- Arturo Malignani, (1865-1939), inventor - from 1898 to 1900 he built the Crosis dam, with its splendid waterfall, and the Ciseriis power plant
- Olinto Marinelli, (1876-1926), geographer
- Chino Ermacora, (1894-1957), writer
- Aldo Moretti, (1909-2002), presbyter and partisan, Gold Medal of Military Valour
- Anzil Toffolo, (1911-2000), painter
- Vittorio Gritti, founder of the Gruppo Folkloristico "Chino Ermacora", creator of the Festival of Hearts and Prize Epifania
- Luciano Ceschia, (1925-1991), sculptor, painter
- Albino Lucatello, (1927-1984), painter
- Bruna Sibille Sizia, journalist, writer
- Claudio Giorgi, (1944), actor, cinematographic director
- Toni Zanussi, (1952), painter
- Luigi Miconi, soccer player, coach
- Elena Aganoor, (1852–1912), poet
- Ugo Giavitto, (1920-1941), Gold Medal of Military Valour
