= Armstead Otey Grubb =

American president of Lincoln University of Pennsylvania (1903–1958)

Acting President of Lincoln University
- In office 1957–1960
- Preceded by: Horace Mann Bond
- Succeeded by: Donald Charles Yelton

Personal details
- Born: March 14, 1903 Chanute, Kansas, US
- Died: December 5, 1968 (aged 65) Oxford, Pennsylvania, US
- Spouse: Marianna Priest (m. 1928; died 1962)
- Children: 1
- Education: University of Pennsylvania, Princeton University
- Occupation: Educator, librarian, academic administrator

Armstead Otey Grubb (March 14, 1903 – December 5, 1968) was an American educator who served as professor of French and Spanish and as head librarian at Lincoln University in Oxford, Pennsylvania. From 1957 to 1960, Grubb served as acting president of Lincoln University. He was robbed and murdered outside his home on the university's campus in 1968.

== Life and career ==
Grubb was born in Chanute, Kansas, on March 14, 1903, to Alfred and Mabel Bailey Grubb. He received a BA in modern languages with highest honors from Princeton University in 1925, spending a summer at the University of Dijon. He received a PhD from the University of Pennsylvania in 1928. Privately printed in 1937, Grubb's dissertation examined French sports neologisms. Writing in Language, Roland G. Kent praised Grubb's monograph as a "valuable contribution to lexicology."

Grubb taught French for ten years at the William Penn Charter School in Philadelphia before joining Lincoln University's faculty as a professor of modern languages in 1937. Starting in 1940, Grubb served as registrar and head librarian, overseeing Vail Memorial Library's collections and staff. He was an advisor to the Spanish Club and The Lincolnian student newspaper. Grubb served as acting president of Lincoln University from 1957 to 1960 after President Horace Mann Bond resigned.

At the time of his death, Grubb was on the Oxford Library Council and formerly was on the board of the Community Memorial Hospital. He was a member of the American Library Association and the American Association of University Professors.

Grubb married Marianna Priest on December 27, 1928. She died in 1962. The couple had one daughter, born circa 1936.

== Murder ==
=== Crime ===
Grubb was murdered on the evening of December 5, 1968, after returning home from a visit to Mrs. Katherine Wilson, whom friends reported that Grubb planned to marry. He died sometime between 8 pm and midnight. Assailants stole Grubb's wallet containing $100 along with his car keys, clubbed him eight times on the head with a baseball bat found bloodied nearby, and dragged him into the basement of a vacant house next to his house on campus. Investigators established that Grubb had been lured outdoors and assaulted. His long-time neighbor, Marjorie Cole, reported that Grubb habitually walked his cat at night. The cat was nowhere to be found.

The next morning (Friday, December 6), Wilson and Cole searched the area and discovered Grubb's body in the basement of the vacant house at approximately 8:30 am. According to the coroner, Grubb had died within two or three minutes of the assault, suffering from a fractured skull and acute brain injury. He had lived alone after his wife died in 1962 and his mother in 1963. His house and others on faculty row, along with nearby residences, had experienced a rash of burglaries over the previous five years.

=== Suspects ===
Police arrested three local youths within hours and charged two with murder, robbery, burglary, and pointing a deadly weapon. The main suspects were Richard Twyman, an 18-year-old unemployed man who had dropped out of elementary school, and Gary Butcher, a 15-year-old high school student. The third suspect was Richard's 16-year-old brother Frankie Twyman, who worked in the kitchens at Lincoln University. Frankie was held as a material witness. Two of the suspects knew Grubb—the professor had recently reported Richard Twyman to the police for breaking into his house, and he had given Frankie Twyman a check for five dollars on December 3. The suspects' father, farmer Earl Twyman, told The Philadelphia Inquirer that this gift reflected Grubb's customary generosity. The Twymans lived half a mile away from the scene of the crime.

=== Convictions ===
In December 1968, the 15-year-old suspect, Gary Butcher, was convicted of voluntary manslaughter and conspiracy in a jury trial and was sentenced to six to twelve years in prison. In July 1971, the 18-year-old suspect, Richard Twyman, was convicted and sentenced to serve eight to twenty years in prison for burglary, six to twelve years for voluntary manslaughter, and two and a half to five years for violation of Pennsylvania's Uniform Firearms Act. The sentences were to be served concurrently. In 1974, Twyman received a furlough from the state penitentiary and assaulted a young woman in Oxford less than five hours after his release. He was returned to prison.
