= Ruth Clement Bond =

African-American educator, civic leader, and quilt designer (1904–2005)

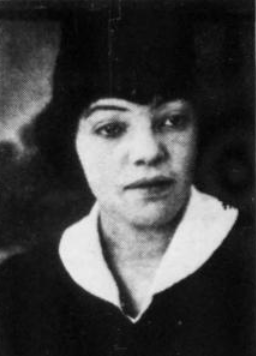
- Ruth Clement (later Bond), from a 1925 publication
- Born: May 22, 1904
- Died: October 24, 2005 (age 101)
- Occupations: Educator, civic leader, artist
- Spouse: J. Max Bond Sr.
- Children: J. Max Bond Jr.
- Relatives: Julian Bond (nephew)

Ruth Clement Bond (May 22, 1904 – October 24, 2005) was an African-American educator, civic leader and artist. As an educator, Bond taught at universities in Haiti, Liberia and Malawi. She headed the African-American Women's Association and in the course of her career advocated for women and children in the US, Afghanistan, the Ivory Coast, Senegal, Sierra Leone, Togo and Tunisia. As an artist, Ruth is notable for elevating the utilitarian quilt into an avant-garde work of social commentary. Three such quilts remain from this creative period in the 1930s. Those quilts were exhibited at the Museum of Arts and Design in New York and the Michigan State University Museum.

== Early life and family ==
Ruth Elizabeth Clement was born in Louisville, Kentucky on May 22, 1904, to George Clinton Clement, a bishop in the African Methodist Episcopal Zion Church, and Emma Clarissa Williams Clement. She was the fourth of seven children.

In 1931, Clement married Dr. J. Max Bond Sr with whom she had three children: historian Jane Bond Howard, architect J. Max Bond Jr., and anthropologist George Clement Bond. Their nephew was Julian Bond, organizer of the SNCC.

The Bonds moved to Los Angeles shortly after marriage. By 1934, they were living and working in rural Alabama. After her husband joined the Foreign Service in 1944 until the end of her own life, Ruth traveled to many countries, and particularly to countries in Africa or with African heritage.

== Education ==
Bond attended Livingstone College (of which both her parents were graduates), but earned both her bachelor's and master's degrees in English from Northwestern University. At Livingstone College, she was a charter member of the Alpha Xi chapter of Alpha Kappa Alpha sorority, founded April 18, 1930. Ruth began a doctoral program in Los Angeles that she left after the birth of her first child. She had intended to complete her doctoral studies after the family moved to rural Alabama, but there were no local universities in which to enroll.

== Career ==
From 1930 to 1932, Bond was chair of the English department at Kentucky State College. In the course of her career, Bond taught at universities in Haiti, Liberia and Malawi. While living in Alabama for her husband's work, Bond assisted former sharecropper families in segregated villages with home economics and improvement.

Bond's most notable artistic achievement was the design of a series of quilts in the 1930s. From 1934 to 1938, J. Max Bond Sr. served as the Director of Negro Personnel and Education with the Tennessee Valley Authority. During this time, Ruth worked with a home beautification project to decorate the homes of Black construction workers working to build the Wheeler Dam in Alabama. She designed a series of striking patterns for art quilts that were then made by the wives of the workers. Though this was her first and only foray into quilting, her striking modern patterns are remembered as a significant innovation in quilt art, helping move quilt design "from the practical to the artistic realm." She departed from the floral and geometric patterns common in quilt design, depicting silhouettes of Black workers, in a "jagged yet elegant" style reminiscent of Henri Matisse's paper cutouts and Aaron Douglas's paintings. The first quilt was called "Black Power." In Ruth's own words: "That was a pun, of course, TVA being about power. The first quilt showed a bolt of lightning signifying power, held in the hand of a black worker." Altogether, Ruth and the group of women quilters constructed six quilts, known as the "T.V.A. quilts," of which three are remaining; they have been exhibited at the Museum of Arts and Design and the Michigan State University Museum, among others.

In 1944, Max accepted a role with the United States Department of State, and the Bonds travelled to Haiti, where Ruth served on the faculty of L'Ecole Normale de Martissant. In 1950, they were posted to Liberia, where Max would serve as the president of the University of Liberia, and Ruth headed the university's English department. In the 1950s and early 1960s, they were posted to Afghanistan, Tunisia, Sierra Leone, and Nyasaland.

== Later life ==
Following Max's retirement in 1966, the Bonds returned to the United States and took up residence in Washington, D.C., where they both became involved with community issues. During the 1960s, Ruth served as the president of the African-American Women's Association. In 1978, she worked with a fact-finding mission led by the National Council of Negro Women to study the role of women in Senegal, Togo, and the Ivory Coast. Both the Bonds were involved with the Africa-America Institute, founded by Max's brother Horace Mann Bond. In D.C., Ruth was on the boards of the Boys and Girls Club of Washington, the YMCA, and the Red Cross, and was an active member of the Foreign Service Women's Association.

Ruth died on 24 October 2005, at the age of 101.
