= Emma C. Clement =

Emma Clarissa Williams (1874–1952) was an American church leader, clubwoman and activist. In 1946 she became the first African-American woman to be appointed American Mother of the Year by the American Mothers Committee of the Golden Rule Foundation in New York.

With her husband George Clinton Clement, she was the mother of seven children, including Ruth Clement Bond.
