= William Watts Ball =

Newspaper editor and author

William Watts Ball (December 9, 1868 — October 14, 1952) was a newspaper editor, journalism dean, columnist, and writer in South Carolina. He was noted for his Conservatism. The Duke University Library has a collection of his papers.

He was born in Laurens, South Carolina.

The Editor and the Republic is a collection of his speeches and articles published by UNC Press. John D. Stark wrote his thesis about him in 1961.

== Bibliography ==
- The state that forgot; South Carolina's surrender to democracy
- Essays in reaction: Back to Calhoun, Back to aristocracy, read before the Kosmos Club of Columbia, S.C
- A boy's recollections of the Red Shirt campaign of 1876 in South Carolina
- An episode in South Carolina politics
- Call it by its name
- The freedom of the press in South Carolina and its limitations
- A view of the state. Response to the sentiment "The day we celebrate" at the 184th Anniversary dinner of the St. Andrew's Society of Charleston, S.C
