= African Review =

Ghanaian magazine

The African Review
- Frequency: Monthly magazine
- Founded: 1965
- Country: Ghana

The African Review was a magazine published in Ghana between 1965 and 1966. Funded by the government of Kwame Nkrumah, it covered politics, economics and culture from a socialist and anti-colonial perspective.

Its staff included members of Ghana's prominent African American community. The author Julian Mayfield was the magazine's editor-in-chief while Maya Angelou contributed articles about politics and culture. Jean Carey Bond, St. Clair Drake and Preston King also wrote for the magazine while Tom Feelings contributed original artwork. It also featured early work by the Botswanan author Bessie Head and the Jamaican poet Neville Dawes.

The African Review was distributed in by the Publicity Secretariat in Ghana and by John Henrik Clarke in the United States, but poor funding appears to have limited its reach elsewhere. After a coup toppled the Nkrumah government in 1966, the newly-formed National Liberation Council banned the magazine and publication permanently ceased.
