= Albino Lucatello =

Italian painter (1927–1984)

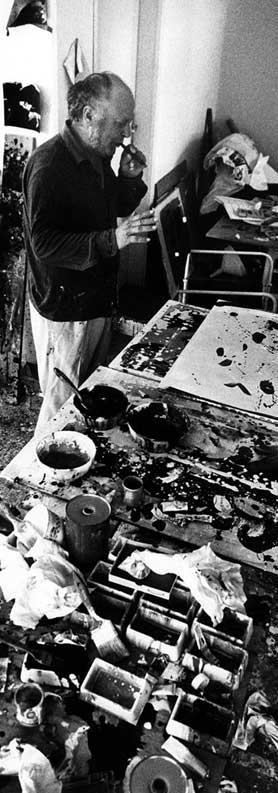
- Born: 21 March 1927; Venice
- Died: 28 October 1984 (aged 57); Udine

Albino Lucatello (Venice, 21 March 1927 − Udine, 28 October 1984) was a modern Italian painter.

== Early life ==
Born into a modest family from Venice, Lucatello lived with his parents Andrea and Teresa Brunello near the local parish church, Basilica dei Frari, where he would spend his time leafing through the art books stored in the sacristy.

He attended the Carmini Art Institute, combining formal academic study with his personal study of the city's heritage through its church paintings, museums and art collections. He concluded his studies in 1949 after a course at the Scuola Libera del Nudo run by the Accademia di Belle Arti di Venezia. Here he was conferred the Institute's first prize for drawing, which he received from maestro Virgilio Guidi, who was to remain a friend. The prize announced his artistic debut among the new generation of up-and-coming artists and gave him his own studio on the top floor of Palazzo Carminati, at San Stae for eleven consecutive years, courtesy of the Opera Bevilacqua La Masa Foundation.

== The Venetian period ==
In the period immediately following the Second World War, Venice was one of the most active cultural centres in Italy, spurred in part by the highly influential arts movement Fronte Nuovo delle Arti. When Lucatello came to exhibit his works, the movement had already begun to diminish, although the rift between neo-realism and abstractionism (Pizzinato, Vedova) continued to rage.

Lucatello's view of the world was seen through the prism of the poor and disadvantaged, hence his general interest in the Communist Party and Marxist theory.

Initially, Lucatello exhibited his charcoal drawings mainly at the annual competitions of the Opera Bevilacqua La Masa Foundation, which in 1952 awarded him first prize. These explicitly neo-realist works included the series entitled Carbonai (Coalmen), Mondine (Paddy-field Workers), the Alluvionate del Polesine (Polesine Floods) and l’Operaio dormiente (Sleeping Factory Worker). Inspired by the views from his studio, Lucatello produced a series of paintings (oil on hardboard) entitled Tetti di Venezia (Rooftops of Venice), three of which were selected by the jury of the Venice Biennale, which awarded him the Tursi Prize. In 1956 he began his collaboration with the Esther Robles Gallery of Los Angeles, which organized several solo and group exhibitions in California, and the same year exhibited in a show featuring European painters at the Museum of Contemporary Art in Houston, Texas. The contract with the Californian gallery was to end abruptly and inexplicably just a few years later, however, given the political climate in America at that time, the era of McCarthyism, the reason likely lay in the artist's political leanings.

Whilst living in the Polesine, an area around the Po river, Lucatello produced several series of paintings: Delta, Stagni (Ponds), and Donne di Comacchio (The Women of Comacchio). Later he moved with his family to an island in the lagoon, and it was here that he painted Orti a Portosecco (Portosecco Gardens) and the first of his Terre Grumose (Clumpy Earth) series.

== Friulian period ==
In 1953, Lucatello married Giselda Paulon, with whom he was to have five children. When, in 1961, he took up a teaching post at the Istituto d’Arte in Udine, he moved to Friuli definitively, settling with his family in the nearby town of Tarcento. Now that his work was inextricably linked to nature, this new environment opened up new possibilities, presenting new courses to follow and subjects to paint. He found an affinity with the surrounding Friulian landscape and a sense of inner equilibrium painting the Tagliamento and its grassy banks. Other subjects and other series followed: Soli (Suns), Momenti di natura (Moments of Nature), Dialettica uomo-natura (Dialectic between Man and Nature) and then Ostacoli (Obstacles), which marked an important period in his oeuvre. In the wake of the earthquake of 1976, which demolished his studio, he was forced to take a break from painting and for a few months returned to working with charcoal, producing Terremotate a Grado (The Grado Earthquakes). On re-opening his studio, he resumed his painting with a series of works inspired by the Friulian landscape: Nature del Friuli and Soli (Friulian Nature and Suns). This was followed by a series of paintings entitled Musi depicting the mountain range around Tarcento; it was to be his last, being abruptly interrupted by his untimely death.

In 1986, two years after his death, the Venice City Council dedicated a large retrospective to Albino Lucatello at the Opera Bevilacqua La Masa Foundation. This was followed two years later by an extensive exhibition at the Galleria d’Arte Moderna organized by the Udine City Council.

In 2004 the Regional Authority of Friuli Venezia Giulia and the Municipal Council of Tarcento paid homage to Lucatello with a large exhibition held at Villa Moretti in Tarcento, with a supplementary graphic exhibition at the town museum, Museo di Udine. His works are currently exhibited at the Museo d’Arte Moderna Ca’ Pesaro di Venezia, the Contemporary Arts Museum in Houston, the Museum of Modern Art in Zagabria and at the Museo di Arte Moderna e Contemporanea in Udine.

== Philosophical thought and painting style ==
Despite initially nailing his colours with both passion and conviction to the mast of Neo-realism, Lucatello was very soon persuaded that simply denouncing the injustices of the world would never be sufficient to change it and that whatever awareness raising there was, it would always be too tardy and too little. Nothing can ever change – reasoned Lucatello – until man truly reveals himself, before he begins not only to investigate his relationship with nature but also the meaning of his existence in the world. Observing, seeing, knowing ‘how’ to ‘look’ and listen to the ‘silent’ thread of the past, can open up innumerable paths. As early as 1950, Virgilio Guidi was to intuit that "Lucatello's work has a naturalistic appearance, that tentative, indeterminate quality of the young when faced with the problem of [representing] nature, and yet, in reality, its structure is not naturalistic [...] he already has the ability to remove the elements of visible reality, to exclude the superfluous and to assemble that which he sees as necessary in a light that is necessarily by no means accidental. These factors, do not strictly belong to naturalism."

This ability to see beneath the surface, to reveal that which is not immediately visible or is otherwise obscured by a prescriptive 'by numbers' approach, is aided by Lucatello's ongoing study of light, colour, and materiality, in all their myriad combinations. His is a realism set free from the bounds of mere representation. Not all discern this quality in his artistic production; indeed, there has been a tendency to view his work as being a variant of Arte Informale. It is a reading that is counterposed by works such as Teiere (Teapots), even as early as the late fifties. In this series of around twenty paintings depicting a river delta, Lucatello procatively introduces the somewhat improbable yet distinct form of a teapot, clearly visible in all its reassuring familiarity. By persisting in this direction, Lucatello gradually develops his own ideological vision and painting style, reaching artistic maturity in the late sixties and early seventies. His research takes on ever more depth, he becomes more attentive towards particulars, focusing on the smallest and most specific of details, so as to maximize the freedom of form, liberating it from each of its apparent meanings.

It has been seen that Lucatello's works spoke to a 'universal man', speaking not to any historical moment or movement.

Albino Lucatello, with his painting, pulls out these signs and, in revealing them to us, causes us to interact with the ‘before’ which informs our being and is an essential part of who we are, because – he says – there can be no relationships between individuals if we do not start first with the singular, with the individual himself. The achievement of a 'we' is by no means a foregone conclusion. First, there must be a call to account, a self-awareness; it is not a question of isolating oneself from the context in which one finds oneself, far from it. Such an undertaking requires concentration, listening, opening one's mind to joy, insight and understanding, but also to difficulty and pain. There is no predestination, only repeated and unavoidable questions which, in the work of Lucatello, acquire a different form in each of his artistic 'periods'. The many questions posed by Lucatello succeed in generating many more in the beholder. Moving from a rich, intense and complex reality, Lucatello gradually hones in on the essentials, paring back the layers to reveal a single idea, a single thought, a condensed reality rendered all the more potent and forceful by the impactful use of tone – black on black, white on white – a reality stripped bare of the banal, the superfluous.

His is a reality that transports us to a dimension that is timeless and universal, one that not merely represents the inevitable passage of time but which is simultaneously the essence of what has been and what may be – for there is always an alternative, a further possibility. And yet it is also true that the very path that promises to unite and connect us to the world is invariably impeded by existing social structures and superstructures which, instead of liberating us, trap us, imprisoning us in an existence without purpose or direction – as conveyed by the frequent use of black, by the series Obstacles, or by other symbolic features such as the faces of those who ask to rejoin the path, ready and willing to do what it takes to overcome all that stands between us and life. Through his art, Lucatello expressed what was very much a secular view of life, one tuned into the myriad forces that move us: «There is something of the mystical here, a dormant and perhaps unconsciously religious sense, which is in constant search of a dialogue with the material. And it is this interchange that imbues his work with its poetic soul and distinct spiritual meaning».

== Major exhibitions ==
- 1956: 28th Venice International Art Biennale; winner of the Tursi Prize, catalogue published;
- 1957: Modern Italian Painters, World House Gallery, New York, catalogue published;
- 1958: The New Renaissance in Italy, Pasadena Art Museum Pasadena, catalogue published (Levitt Thomas);
- 1958: 50 years of Venetian painting, Warsaw, catalogue published;
- 1958: Group exhibition, Directional Galleries, Los Angeles, catalogue published;
- 1958: Solo exhibition, Esther Robles Gallery, Los Angeles, catalogue published;
- 1959: 8th Rome Quadrenniale, Rome, catalogue published;
- 1959: Group exhibition, Museo del Prado, Madrid, catalogue published (Silvio Brandi);
- 1960: Esther Robles Gallery, Los Angeles, catalogue published (Bruno Rosada);
- 1960: Group exhibition, New European Artists Contemporary Arts Museum, Houston, Texas, catalogue published;
- 1961: Italian Centennial Exhibition, University of Southern California, Los Angeles, catalogue published;
- 1961: Group exhibition at the premises of The Art Association, Palos Verdes, California, catalogue published;
- 1961: Peintures et sculptures italiennes contemporains (Italian Contemporary Painters and Sculptors), Galerie Alec Saab, Beirut, catalogue published (Dessy Nicola);
- 1962: 40 Venetian Painters, Contemporary Art Gallery, Zagreb, catalogue published;
- 1962: Peinture Venitienne d'Aujourd'hui (Venetian Painters of Today), Galerie Pierre Domec, Paris, catalogue published;
- 1969: Acht Venezianer Maler in Deutschland, touring exhibition held in the Istituti Italiani di Cultura (Italian Cultural Institutes) Germany, catalogue published (Silvio Brandi);
- 1971: Group exhibition, Kursaal Casino Lignano Sabbiadoro, Italy, catalogue published;
- 1976: Albino Lucatello, Palazzo delle Prigioni Vecchie, Circolo Artistico, Venice, catalogue published;
- 1978: Lucatello, Centro Friulano Arti Plastiche, Udine, catalogue published;
- 1979: Lucatello, Galleria Falaschi, Passariano, Codroipo, Italy, poster and catalogue published;
- 1983: Albino Lucatello, Galleria 'Il Traghetto', Venice; catalogue published;
- 1986: Lucatello: retrospettiva (Lucatello: Retrospective), Venice City Council exhibition held at the Fondazione Bevilacqua La Masa, Venice, catalogue published (written by Renzo Viezzi, with biography by Giselda Lucatello and critical essay by Bruno Rosada);
- 1988: Lucatello - 20 anni di pittura (1964 -1984) (Lucatello: 20 Years of Painting -1964-1984), Galleria d’Arte Moderna, Udine, organised in collaboration with the Centro Friulano Arti Plastiche, Udine Provincial Authority and Udine City Council, catalogue published (includes critical essay by Franco Solmi);
- 1988: Attraverso il disegno (Through Drawing) 1952 -1988, organised by the Centro Friulano Arti Plastiche and Galleria del Centro, catalogue published (with critical essay by Franco Solmi and biography by Giselda Lucatello);
- 1996: Lucatello. Tra il Tagliamento e i Musi (Lucatello - Between the Tagliamento and the Musi), Palazzo Gregoris, Pordenone, organised with the support of the Municipal Authority of Pordenone, the Provincial Authority of Pordenone, Provincial Authority of Udine, Ascom, and the Società Operaia, Catalogue (Arti Grafiche) available, with critical essay by Giancarlo Pauletto;
- 2004: Lucatello pittore del '900 (Lucatello, 20th Century Painter), Villa Moretti Tarcento, graphic appendix held at the Galleria d’Arte Moderna, Udine;
- 2014: Lucatello. Pensiero/Pittura (Lucatello – Thought and Painting), Palazzo Frangipane, Tarcento, organised by the Tarcento Town Library and CICT on the occasion of the thirtieth anniversary of the painter's death.

== Bibliography ==
- Danielis, Lucia (2003). "Albino Lucatello, A Neo-realist –Informale Painter in Venice" - "Albino Lucatello un pittore a Venezia tra neorealismo e informale". Trieste: degree thesis, Department of Contemporary Art History, University of Trieste.
- Reale, Isabella (2001). "The Arts in Udine in The Twentieth Century" - "Le arti a Udine nel Novecento". Venice: Marsilio Editori, second volume, p.126, includes reproduction of "Natura del Friuli", Buja ("The Nature of Friuli", Buja).
- Reale, Isabella (2000). Guide to the Arts in Udine in the Twentieth Century - Guida all'arte del '900 in Friuli. Udine: Paolo Gaspari Editore, includes reproduction of Lucatello’s work "Dialettica uomo—natura" (The Man-Nature Dialectic), which currently belongs to the Galleria d’Arte Moderna, Udine.
- Caramel, Giuseppe (1990). Art in Italy 1945-1960: Life and Thought - Arte in Italia 1945 - 1960. Milano: Vita e Pensiero.
- Pirovano, Carlo (1993). Painting in Italy: The Twentieth Century 1945-1990 - La pittura in Italia. Il Novecento/2 1945-1990, published in two volumes – First Volume: Dino Marangon, Le Venezie. La Pittura in Italia. Il Novecento/1 (Venice: Painting in Italy – The 20th Century) pp. 437—464, Second Volume: "Dizionario biografico degli artisti" (Biographical Dictionary of Artists), p. 757(includes a reproduction of the painting Musi). Milano: Electa.
- Solmi, Franco (1988). Critical essay in the exhibition catalogue Lucatello - 20 anni di pittura (1964-1984), Udine: Galleria d'Arte Moderna (published on the occasion of the exhibition: Lucatello - 20 anni di pittura (1964-1984), 14 May-31 July 1988, Galleria d'Arte Moderna, Udine). Udine: Galleria d'Arte Moderna, catalogue.
- Bortolatto, Luigina (1987). The reality of the Imagination: 20th Century Works of Art in the Public Collections of the Venezia Giulia, Trentino Alto Adige, Veneto Regions - La realtà dell'immaginario: opere d'arte del XX secolo nelle raccolte pubbliche delle Regioni Friuli—Venezia Giulia, Trentino Alto Adige, Veneto, works cited include the following by Lucatello: "Dialettica Uomo—Natura ("Man-Nature Dialectic"), 1978, oil on canvas (Galleria d'Arte Moderna, Civici Musei di Udine); Tambre, 1949, charcoal drawing (Galleria Internazionale d'Arte Moderna Ca' Pesaro, Venice); "Orti a Portosecco" ("Portosecco Gardens"), 1957, oil on canvas; Natura ("Nature"), 1965, oil on canvas; "Paesaggio sul Tagliamento" ("Tagliamento Landscape"), 1966, oil on canvas; Composizione (Composition), 1975, oil on canvas. Trieste: Sit editrice.
- Lorenzetti, Giulio (1974). Venice and its Estuary: Lucatello Albino - Venezia e il suo estuario: Lucatello Albino (p.761). Trieste: Edizioni Lint.
- Rosada, Bruno (1959). Critical essay in the journal Evento (September–October 1959 ed.). Venice: Jurnal “Evento", pp.34-36.
