= Horace Mann Bond =

American academic administrator and historian

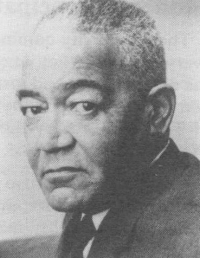

President of Lincoln University
- In office 1945–1957
- Preceded by: Walter Livingston Wright
- Succeeded by: Armstead Otey Grubb

President of Fort Valley State College
- In office 1939–1945
- Succeeded by: Cornelius V. Troup

Personal details
- Born: November 8, 1904 Nashville, Tennessee, U.S.
- Died: December 21, 1972 (aged 68) Atlanta, Georgia, U.S.
- Children: Julian Bond
- Education: Lincoln University; University of Chicago

Horace Mann Bond (November 8, 1904 – December 21, 1972) was an American historian, college administrator, social science researcher and the father of civil-rights leader Julian Bond. He earned graduate and doctoral degrees from University of Chicago at a time when only a small percentage of any young adults attended any college. He was an influential leader at several historically black colleges and was appointed the first president of Fort Valley State University in Georgia in 1939, where he managed its growth in programs and revenue. In 1945, he became the first African-American president of Lincoln University in Pennsylvania.

== Early life and education ==
Horace was born November 8, 1904, in Nashville, Tennessee, the grandson of enslaved Africans. Both his parents were college educated. His mother, Jane Alice Browne, was a schoolteacher, and his father, James Bond, was a minister who served at Congregational churches across the South, often associated with historically black colleges. His mother had graduated from Oberlin College in Ohio, and his father graduated from Berea College in Berea, Kentucky, in 1892. James Bond later served as a Berea College Trustee from 1896 to 1914. Both Berea and Oberlin are among the first colleges that were interracial. His parents were among the black elite with their educations and encouraged their children in academic achievement.

Horace was the sixth of seven children. One of his brothers, J. Max Bond, Sr., became a prominent educator. During his childhood, Bond had several unpleasant encounters with whites. In one incident a white man shot at their house after having a fight with Horace's older brothers. In another, his father was arrested by a white neighbor, who was a police officer, when the Bond family moved into an all-white street. Bond excelled in school, entering high school at the age of nine and college at fourteen.

Bond graduated in 1923 at age 19 with honors from Lincoln University, a historically black college in Pennsylvania. He was one of the twenty-four founders of Beta Kappa Chi honor society. He was a member of Kappa Alpha Psi fraternity. At Penn State, where he went for graduate work, Bond realized that he was able to compete with white classmates, and earned competitive grades above the 90th percentile.

Later Bond returned to Lincoln University to work as an instructor. Bond then suffered the only setback to his success; he was dismissed from the college for tolerating a gambling ring in a dormitory which he was supervising. Despite his embarrassment at Lincoln, Bond achieved a reputation as a fine scholar and administrator.

Bond earned the M.A. and Ph.D degrees from the University of Chicago, where his dissertation on black education in Alabama won the Rosenberger Prize in 1936. It was published in 1939. As was customary in those years, Bond taught at a variety of academic institutions before completing his doctorate. He published his first academic book in 1934. His early work was recognized by the Rosenwald Fund, which granted him fellowships in 1931 and 1932 and went on to support most of the rest of his career.

== Marriage and family ==
Bond married Julia Agnes Washington in 1930 . She was a student he met while teaching at Fisk University in Nashville, Tennessee in the 1920s. Julia Washington was from a wealthy and prominent African-American family of mixed race in Nashville. She and Horace had three children: Jane Margaret, born 1939; Horace Julian, born in 1940; and James, born in 1944. Bond and his wife had high expectations for all three of their children.

Jane Bond Moore became a labor lawyer specializing in employment discrimination. She formerly represented the Oakland Unified School District and the Federal Trade Commission. She currently teaches Employment Law and Civil Rights Law at John F. Kennedy University College of Law. James Bond was a politician and member of the Atlanta City Council. Julian Bond (1940–2015) was chairman of the National Association for the Advancement of Colored People from 1998 to 2010. In the 1960s, he became a leader in the Civil Rights Movement, founding the Student Nonviolent Coordinating Committee (SNCC), of black college students. Julian Bond was elected to both houses of the state legislature in Georgia, where he served a total of 20 years. In his social activism and long political career, the younger Bond achieved a national renown beyond his father's.

== Career ==
Bond taught at several institutions while completing his doctorate, including such historically black universities as Langston University in Langston, Oklahoma; Fisk University in Nashville, Tennessee; and Dillard University in New Orleans, Louisiana.

He worked his way up in academic administration, proving his leadership abilities by becoming dean at Dillard University in 1934, and chairman of the education department at Fisk University later in the 1930s. Bond was the founding president of Fort Valley State College, in Fort Valley, Georgia, where he was appointed in 1939 and served until 1945. During his tenure he managed expansion of the college to a four-year institution. More importantly, he doubled school income and tripled the state's appropriation for the college during lean economic times in the nation, substantial achievements for any college, and especially for a black college during the years of segregation. he died in Atlanta Georgia in 1972 of complications from heart disease at age 68.

In 1945 Bond was selected as president of Lincoln University, the first African American to be appointed to that position. He served at his alma mater until 1957. During those years, he started years of research for his history of Lincoln University. In 1953, together with historians John Hope Franklin and C. Vann Woodward, Bond did research that helped support the National Association for the Advancement of Colored People (NAACP)'s landmark US Supreme Court case of Brown v. Board of Education (1954).

== Critique of intelligence testing ==
Bond's first publications were in the NAACP magazine The Crisis in 1924. Here, following the publication of Brigham's analysis of Army intelligence tests he critiqued the logic behind Brighams conclusions that the lower African-American test scores indicated an inherent intellectual inferiority of the Negro race. Bond, concluded that "the medial score of White soldiers from the states of Mississippi, Kentucky, Arkansas, and Georgia, averaged ... the mental age of a twelve and a half year old child". And he asked "Are the exponents of intelligence tests as discriminators of racial differences prepared to assert that the white population of Arkansas is inherently and racially inferior to the whites of another section of the country?".

In 1956 a group of White Southern Senators signed the Southern Manifesto in opposition to racial integration and the Brown vs. Board of Education decision. They argued that African Americans were not sufficiently intelligent to participate in the same schools as Whites. Bond published a parody of the arguments of the signing senators using the data he had first collected and published in 1924. He published the results in an essay titled "Intelligence of Congressmen Who Signed the 'Southern Manifesto' as Measured by IQ Tests". Here he concluded that based on the Army intelligence tests the average of signing senators was in the lowest 20% of American Whites, on average signatories attended a college of the lowest ten percent of median National scores, and had a constituency whose majority was in the intelligence category of "morons". Consequently, Bond concluded, the logical policy recommendation following the reasoning of the senators, would be to segregate the slow-learning signatories into a group together where they could have "remedial attention to make up for their basic deficiencies". The essay was published by the NAACP and attracted widespread hilarity or uproar depending on viewpoint. Bond later referred to the essay as "his little foolishness", but he maintained that he had made a significant point.

In 1958 Audrey Shuey's "The Testing of Negro Intelligence" was published, concluding, mostly based on old intelligence studies that Bond and others had refuted in the 1920s, that the intelligence of African Americans was innately inferior to that of Whites. Bond published a scathing review in which he showed that Shuey ignored many contradictory studies, and used biased methods of comparison, for example comparing Southern black test scores with the White national average, instead of the much lower Southern White scores. Bond concluded that all Shuey had proven was that "everywhere in the United States the American Negro is a subordinated underprivileged social caste".

He then returned with his family to the South, becoming dean of the School of Education at Atlanta University (later Clark Atlanta University). Bond later served as director of the Bureau of Educational and Social Research at the university. He retired in 1971.

== Friendship with Albert Barnes ==
In one of his important relationships while president of Lincoln University, Bond became friends with Albert C. Barnes, businessman, art collector and founder of the nearby Barnes Foundation. Barnes supported education for working people and took a special interest in students of Lincoln University. Barnes structured his foundation to enable Lincoln University to control the foundation's board of trustees, and thereby oversee one of the largest private art collections in the world, with valuable holdings in Impressionist and Modern art.

The art collection was worth $25–30 billion in 2007. In recent years, the Barnes Foundation contested Albert C. Barnes' will and Lincoln University's control in an effort to modernize administration of the institution, provide for renovation of the current building, and to build a new one. Supporters wanted to move the collection to Center City, Philadelphia, where they expect to attract more paying visitors and guarantee the collection's financial viability. In 2005 Pennsylvania Governor Edward Rendell brokered a settlement between the Foundation and the university that would allow moving the collection to Center City.

== Books ==
- The Education of the Negro in the American Social Order(1934),
- The Education of the Negro in Alabama: A Study in Cotton and Steel (1939),
- "Black American Scholars: A Study of their Beginnings" (1972),
- Education for Freedom: A History of Lincoln University (1976); and
- The Star Creek Journal (1997), with Julia W. Bond, ed. Adam Fairclough

He published "stinging critiques" of racial claims about the intelligence of blacks, among which the best known was his essay "Racially Stuffed Shirts and Other Enemies of Mankind", a parody of segregationist psychology of the 1950s.

His papers are archived at the University of Massachusetts Amherst. In his research, he studied the social, economic, and geographic factors influencing academic achievement of black children.
