= Julian Mayfield =

American dramatist and activist (1928–1984)

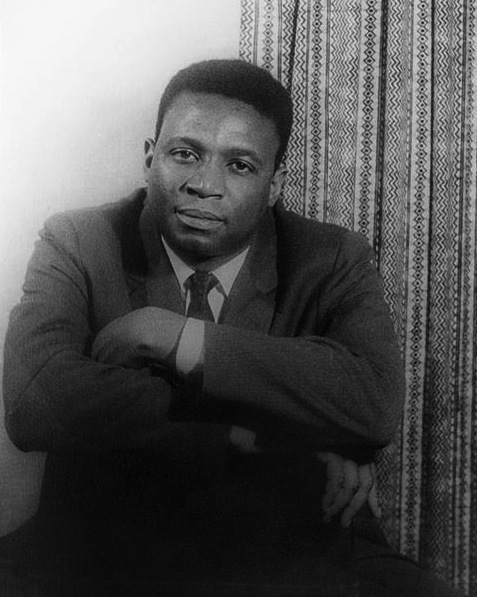
- Born: Julian Hudson Mayfield; June 6, 1928; Greer, South Carolina, United States
- Died: October 20, 1984 (aged 56); Takoma Park, Maryland, United States
- Occupations: Actor; director; writer; lecturer; civil rights activist

Julian Hudson Mayfield (June 6, 1928 – October 20, 1984) was an American actor, director, writer, lecturer and civil rights activist.

== Early life ==
Julian Hudson Mayfield was born on June 6, 1928, in Greer, South Carolina, and was raised from the age of five in Washington, D.C. He attended Paul Laurence Dunbar High School and while there he decided on being a writer as a career. After high school, he joined the US Army in 1946 and was stationed in Hawaii before being honorably discharged. He studied briefly at Lincoln University in Pennsylvania.

== Career ==
Mayfield moved to New York in 1948, originally to study at New York University, but instead began a career in theatre. He developed the role of Absalom Kumalo for the Kurt Weil musical Lost in the Stars during 1949–50, before producing his own play Fire in 1951 and directing Ossie Davis's Alice in Wonder in 1952. Along with Ossie Davis and Ruby Dee, Alice Childress, Rosa Guy, Audre Lorde, John O. Killens, Sarah E. Wright, William Branch, Sidney Poitier, and Loften Mitchell, Mayfield became an important figure in the 'Black Cultural Left'. This group was associated with the African-American singer and political activist Paul Robeson and was composed of actors, writers and artists who believed that art was a key component of the struggle for civil rights. During this period, Mayfield spent summers at Camp Unity, a left-wing interracial summer camp for adults in Wingdale, New York. There, he wrote and produced his one-act play 417, which he later adapted into his first novel, The Hit.

Mayfield drove a taxi cab at night while writing during the day. He also attended the Jefferson School of Social Science on Sixth Avenue. In 1954, Mayfield met and married Puerto Rican doctor and activist, Ana Livia Cordero. Later that year, the couple relocated to San Juan, Puerto Rico. There, Mayfield wrote for the Puerto Rican World Journal, an English newspaper on the island. He also worked at the island's only English radio station. Additionally, he began adapting his one-act play, 417 to novel form. Renamed The Hit, the novel was published in 1957 and was followed by The Long Night in 1958 and The Grand Parade in 1961. In 1955, Mayfield became a target of FBI surveillance due to his association with members of the Communist Party in New York, including Paul Robeson and Louis Burnham, and his role in the Committee for the Negro in the Arts (CNA). His FBI file reported that: "Mayfield, a free-lance writer, has been described as being a Communist Party (CP) sympathizer and to have been a CP member possibly as late as 1955. He has been connected in the past with other organizations which have been designated pursuant to Executive Order 10450." Surveillance on Mayfield continued until the late 1970s.

Returning to the United States in 1959, Mayfield was inspired by the success of the Cuban Revolution. Visiting Cuba at the invitation of Fidel Castro in July 1960, he accompanied Cordero, LeRoi Jones (later known as Amiri Baraka), Sarah E. Wright and Robert F. Williams to Oriente, where they celebrated the anniversary of the attack on the Moncada Barracks and the birth of the Movimiento 26 de Julio. After returning from Cuba, Mayfield began raising money for food and weapons for Williams and ferrying them to Monroe, NC.

In August 1961, after a series of attacks by white terrorists, a tense standoff developed between Williams' self-defense group and white citizens of Monroe. On August 27, Mr. and Mrs. Bruce Stegall from nearby Marshville, NC drove down the dead end street to the house which Williams and others were guarding. Remembering the Stegalls from an earlier white supremacist demonstration, and convinced they had come to his street to prepare for a later attack, Williams held the couple at gunpoint and brought them to his house. They were held and released a few hours later. The FBI, which had previously refused to take action against the violence perpetuated by white citizens of Monroe, charged Williams with kidnapping and named Mayfield and fellow activist Mae Mallory as material witnesses.

Late that night, Williams, his wife Mabel, Mayfield, and Mallory left Monroe in Mayfield's car and made their way to Canada. Robert and Mabel Williams fled to Cuba while Mayfield traveled to London to meet his wife. The couple then flew to Ghana, where Cordero had a taken a job with the government of President Kwame Nkrumah. During Mayfield's time in Ghana, he was employed by the Ministry of Information and wrote for Ghanaian newspapers including the Ghanaian Times, the Evening News, and The Spark. He founded the African Review, a bimonthly journal that featured articles by African-descended intellectuals including Bessie Head, Preston King, and Neville Dawes, analyzing the economic and social issues facing decolonizing Africa. He also helped to establish the international branch of Malcolm X's Organization of Afro-American Unity. Mayfield lived in worked in Ghana until January 1966 before relocating to Ibiza, Spain, just prior to the 1966 Ghanaian coup d'état.

Mayfield returned to the United States in May 1967 and took a job teaching at Cornell University. At the invitation of film director Jules Dassin, he began rewriting the script for The Betrayal, which would later be made into the film Uptight (1968). The movie, which was shot on location in Cleveland, was a financial failure, but it presaged the explosion of Black films in the late 1960s and early 1970s known as Blaxploitation. In November 1971, Mayfield relocated to Guyana at the invitation of the artist Tom Feelings who had recently relocated as a planning officer in the Guyanese Ministry of Education. There, he worked for the government of Forbes Burnham in that leader's attempt to modernize his recently independent nation. Burnham, who had previously been a staunch ally of the United States in the 1960s, proclaimed his support for other Caribbean revolutionary movements in the early 1970s. His first marriage having ended in divorce, Mayfield married Joan Cambridge, a Guyanese writer and colleague in the Ministry of Information and Culture, in 1973. As internal politics became more heated, the nation's economic fortunes suffered and Mayfield left the country in 1975.

== Work as a teacher and university professor ==
He won a Fulbright Fellowship and taught in West Germany and Turkey in 1976. From 1975 to 1978, he worked as a visiting professor at the University of Maryland, College Park, and for his last six years the writer-in-residence at Howard University.

== Death ==
Mayfield died of cardiac arrest at Washington Adventist Hospital in Takoma Park, Maryland, on October 20, 1984, aged 56.

== Selected filmography ==
- Virgin Island (1958)
- Uptight (1968)

== Bibliography ==
Novels

- The Hit (New York: Vanguard, 1957)
- The Long Night (New York: Vanguard, 1958)
- The Grand Parade (New York: Vanguard, 1961)
- Tales of the Lido (unpublished manuscript)
- Death at Karamu (unpublished manuscript)

Plays

- Fire (1951)
- A World Full of Men (1952)
- The Other Foot (1952)
- 417 (1952)

Edited Volume

- Ten Times Black (1972)

Non-Fiction

- The World Without the Bomb: Story of the Accra Assembly (1962)
- Which Way Does the Blood Red River Run? (unpublished autobiography)

== Sources ==
- "Julian Mayfield". Reporting Civil Rights. Archived from the original on June 18, 2011.
- Loomis, Erik (September 23, 2008). "Forgotten American Blogging: Julian Mayfield". Alterdestiny.
- "HU Legends: Julian Mayfield". Howard University. Archived from the original on May 15, 2010.
- Julian Mayfield at IMDb
- "FBI Documents on Julian Mayfield, 1961." United States Department of Justice, September 19, 1961. Web. November 3, 2015.
- Pecinovsky, Tony. "'The Other Blacklist': Red Scare's Impact on African Americans", People's World, May 15, 2015.
