= Eloise Bibb Thompson =

American educator, playwright, poet and journalist (1878–1928)

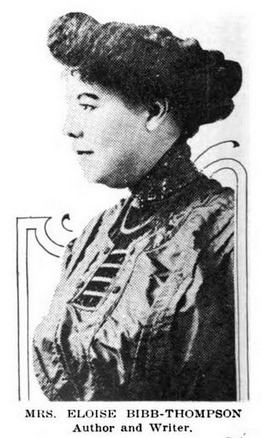
Eloise Bibb Thompson, from a 1919 publication.

Eloise Alberta Veronica Thompson (née Bibb; June 26, 1878 – January 8, 1928) was an American educator, playwright, poet, and journalist. She married fellow journalist and activist Noah D. Thompson.

== Early life ==
Bibb was born in New Orleans, Louisiana, the daughter of Catherine Adele (Brian) Bibb and Charles H. Bibb. Her father was a federal customs inspector. She trained as a teacher at New Orleans University, then attended Oberlin Academy from 1899 to 1901. She graduated from Howard University in 1907. She pursued further studies throughout her life, at Columbia University, University of Southern California, and New York University.

== Career ==
Eloise Bibb taught school in New Orleans as a young woman. Her first book of 26 poems was published in Boston in 1895. From 1908 to 1911 she worked as head resident at the Social Settlement House affiliated with Howard University. Howard University president Wilbur P. Thirkield said: "She is a woman who has accomplished a hard task of colored settlement work by putting her heart in it and her life under it and wrought wonderful results."

She moved to Los Angeles, California, with her new husband in 1911, and wrote for various publications there, including the Los Angeles Tribune, Morning Sun Out West, and Tidings (published by the Diocese of Los Angeles). She was also active in the Catholic Women's Clubs of Los Angeles. The Thompsons were considered members of the "Ink Slingers" literary circle in Los Angeles.

Bibb Thompson's A Reply to the Clansman (1915) was a screenplay in response to the film The Birth of a Nation. She wrote at least four plays: A Friend of Democracy (1920), Caught (1920), Africanus (1922, about the life of Marcus Garvey; it was directed by Olga Grey), and Cooped Up (1924), and she was associated with the National Ethiopian Art Theatre in New York.

== Personal life ==
Eloise Bibb married editor and fellow writer Noah Davis Thompson in 1911, in Chicago. The couple moved from Los Angeles to New York in 1927, for his work in publishing. She died there from cancer early in 1928 at Edgecombe Sanitarium aged 49 years. She had first sought treatment for cancer in Vienna in 1914.
