= List of people from Virginia =

State flag of Virginia

Location of Virginia in the United States

This is a list of notable people who were born in the U.S. state of Virginia, were raised or lived in Virginia, or for whom Virginia is a significant part of their identity. Those not born in Virginia are marked with §.

== A ==
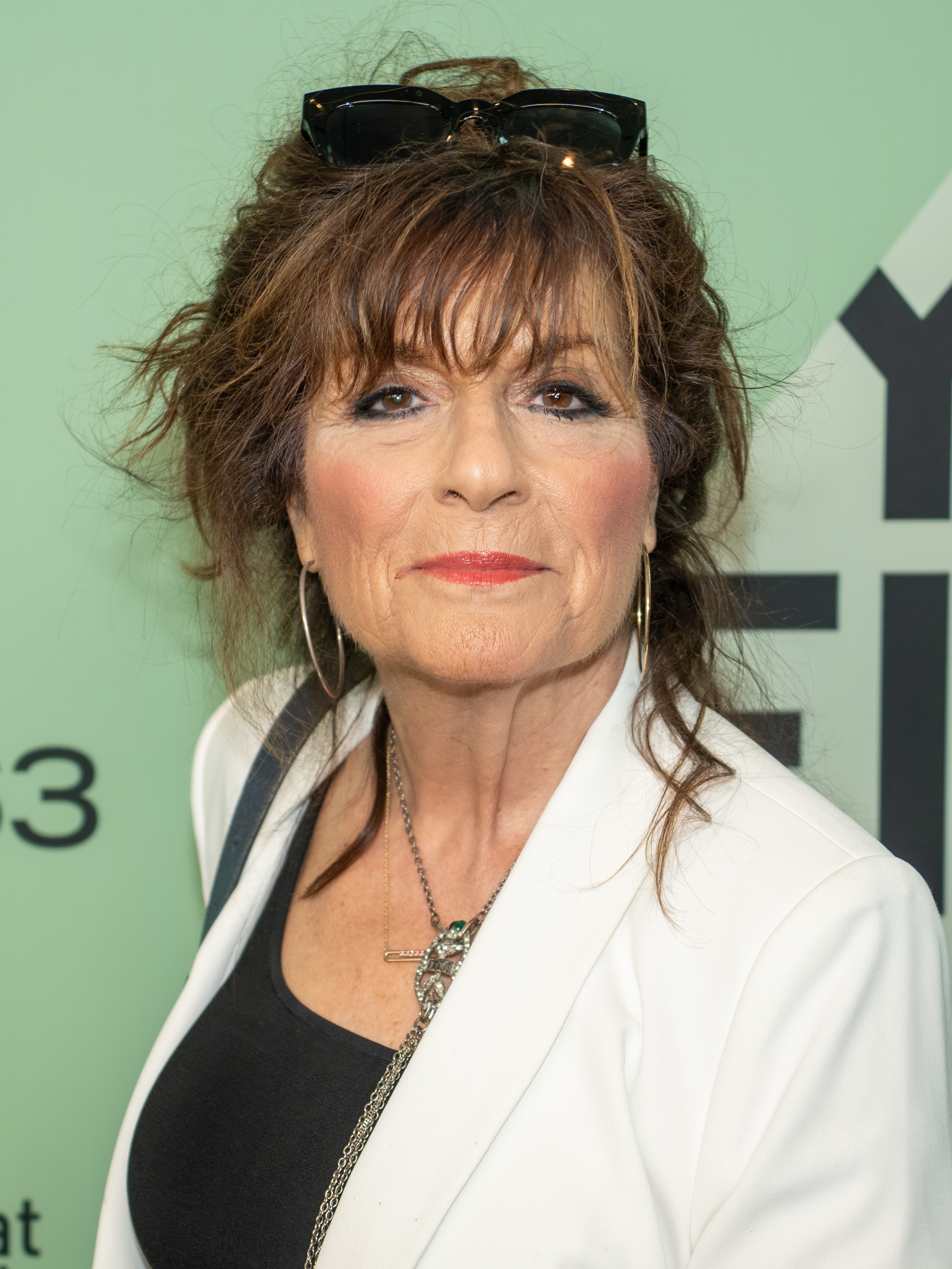
Caroline Aaron

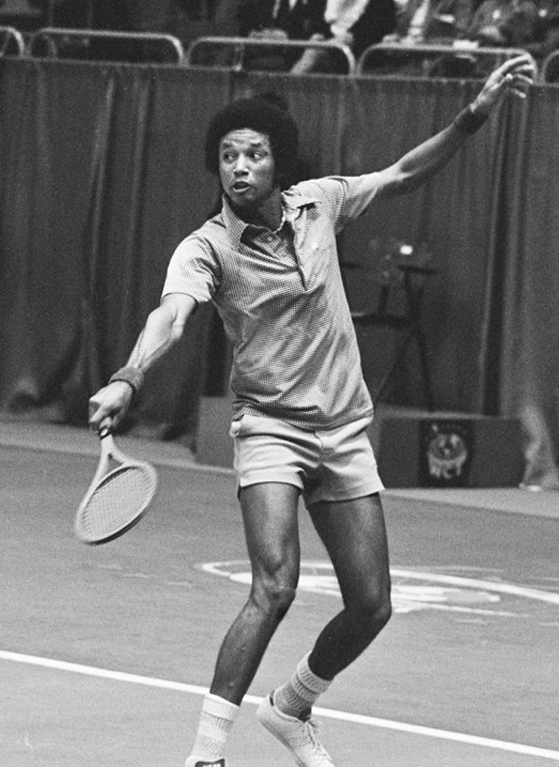
Arthur Ashe

- Alden Aaroe – WRVA talk show host
- Caroline Aaron – actress and producer
- John Aboud – writer, comedian, commentator on Best Week Ever and other VH1 shows
- Jim Acosta – national political correspondent for CNN
- Hunter "Patch" Adams § – doctor, author, and social activist
- Rick Adams – Internet pioneer, founder of UUNET
- Xavier Adibi § – linebacker for Minnesota Vikings
- Cynthia Adinig § – Healthcare equity activist
- Chris Adler – drummer for Lamb of God
- Willie Adler – guitarist for Lamb of God
- Danny Aiken – long snapper for New England Patriots
- Mary C. Alexander – aviation pioneer
- Andy Allanson – former MLB catcher
- James Anderson § – linebacker for Carolina Panthers
- Justin Anderson – player for Dallas Mavericks
- V.C. Andrews – novelist; born in Portsmouth, Virginia
- Anhayla – singer, guitarist, YouTube personality
- Andi Arndt – audiobook narrator
- David Arquette – actor, born on commune in Winchester
- John Ashby – colonel in the Virginia militia
- Arthur Ashe (1943–1993) – tennis player and social activist
- Bob Asher – former NFL offensive tackle
- Abelhaleem Hasan Abdelraziq Ashqar – Palestinian convicted of criminal contempt and obstruction of justice for refusal to testify in a trial related to the funding of Hamas in the US
- Shakira Austin (born 2000) – basketball center for the Israeli team Elitzur Ramla
- Stephen F. Austin (1793–1836) – first secretary of state of Republic of Texas
- Kevin Aviance – dancer

== B ==
Ba–Bm

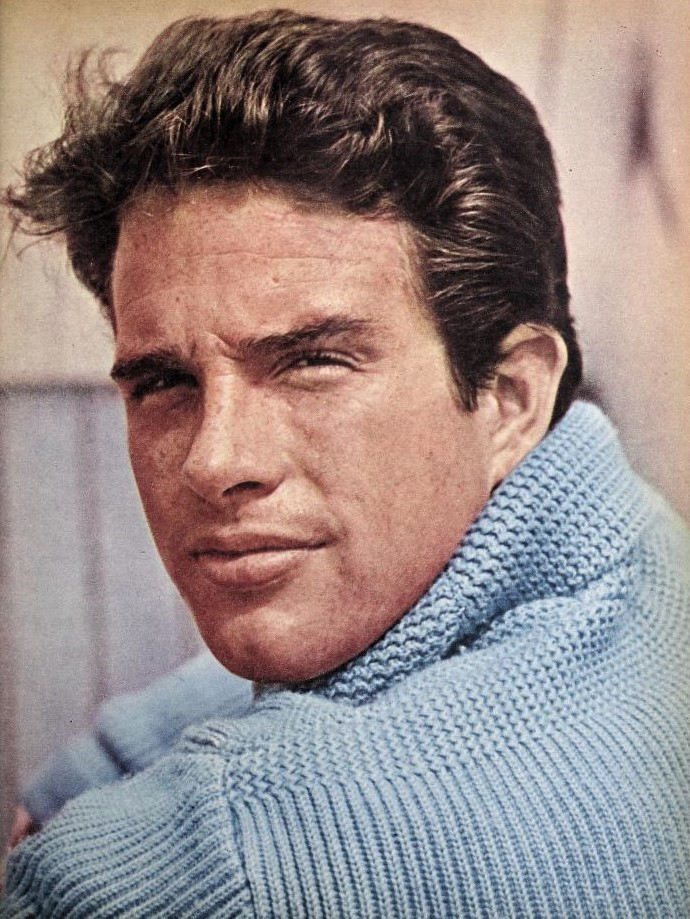
Warren Beatty

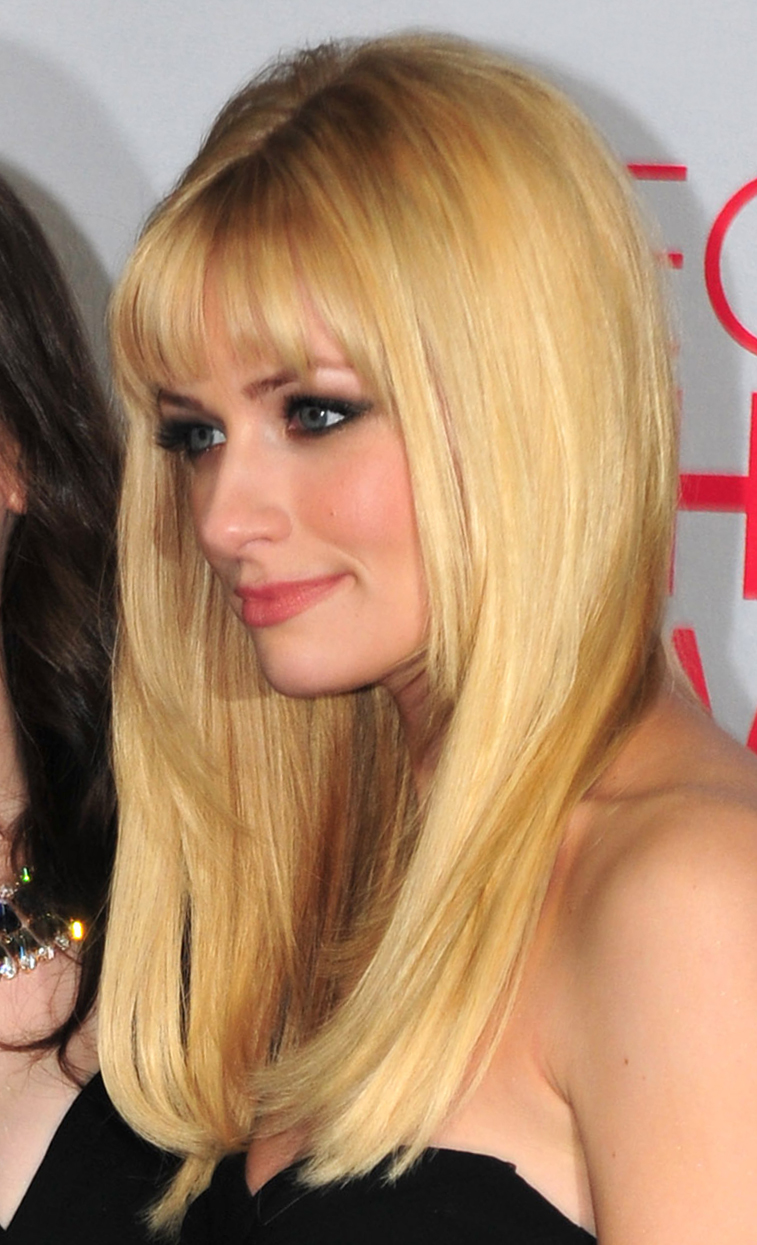
Beth Behrs

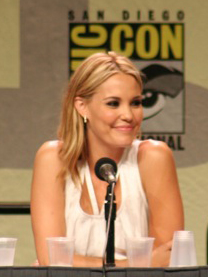
Leslie Bibb

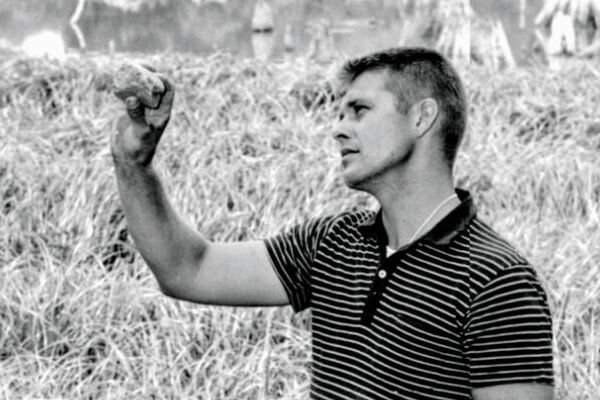
Lewis Binford

- Nathaniel Bacon (1647–1676) – led Bacon's Rebellion against British authority in 1676
- Diedrich Bader (born 1966) – actor
- Margaret L. Bailey (1812–1888) – writer, poet, lyricist, editor, and publisher
- Pearl Bailey – Tony Award-winning actress and singer
- Ronald Bailey § – science editor for Reason magazine
- Dylan Baker § – actor
- David Baldacci – author
- Krystal Ball – businesswoman, co-host of MSNBC show The Cycle
- Gordon Banks – guitarist and songwriter
- Steve Bannon – campaign manager, businessman, media executive, Chief Strategist and senior counselor to President Donald Trump
- Ronde Barber (born 1975) – NFL cornerback
- Tiki Barber (born 1975) – sportscaster, NFL running back
- Don Barclay (born 1989) – NFL offensive lineman
- Kylene Barker – Ms. America 1979
- Melody Barnes (born 1964) – director of Domestic Policy Council for President Barack Obama
- Lauren Barnette – beauty pageant winner and model
- Joey Baron – musician
- Connor Barth (born 1986) – placekicker for Tampa Bay Buccaneers
- Samuel Barton § (1749–1810) – explorer, pioneer; early settler of Nashville, Tennessee
- Viola Baskerville (born 1951) – Virginia Secretary of Administration
- Dave Batista – professional wrestler
- Warren Beatty (born 1937) – actor and Academy Award-winning director
- Beth Behrs § (born 1985) – actress, 2 Broke Girls
- Bob Bender (born 1957) – basketball player and coach
- Antoine Bethea § – football player for San Francisco 49ers
- Larry Bethea § – football player for Dallas Cowboys
- Rainey Bethea (1909–1936) – last person publicly executed in United States
- Leslie Bibb § – actress, Carley Bobby in Talladega Nights: The Ballad of Ricky Bobby
- Jim Bibby – former Major League pitcher; from Madison Heights
- Lewis Binford (1931–2011) – archaeologist
- Adam Birch – professional wrestler for World Wrestling Entertainment's SmackDown!
- Peter Blair – Olympic bronze medalist in freestyle wrestling
- Benny Blanco – record producer and songwriter
- Tom Bliley – member of United States House of Representatives representing Virginia's 3rd congressional district then 7th congressional district
- Dré Bly – football player with the Detroit Lions
- Randy Blythe – singer of metal band Lamb of God

Bn–Bz

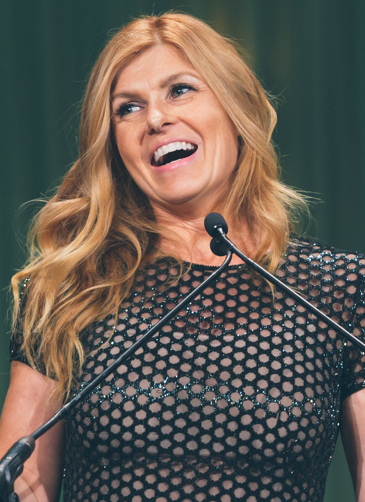
Connie Britton

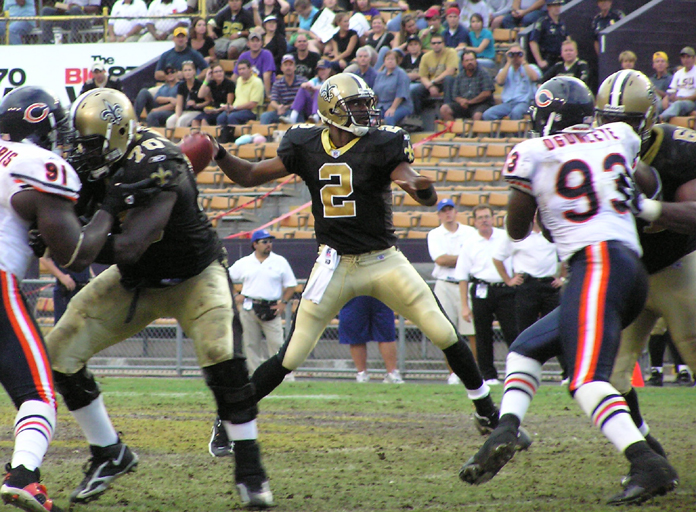
Aaron Brooks

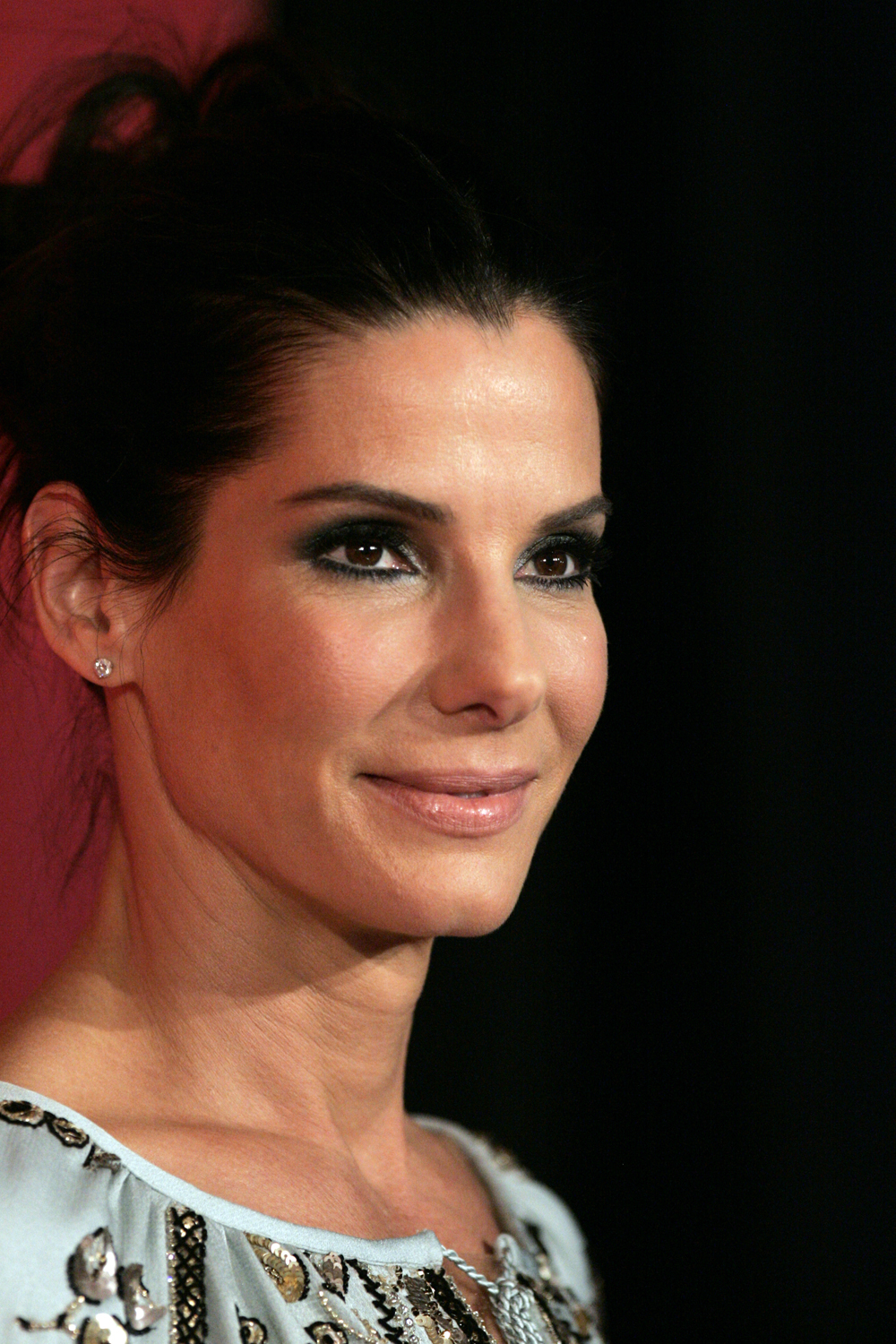
Sandra Bullock

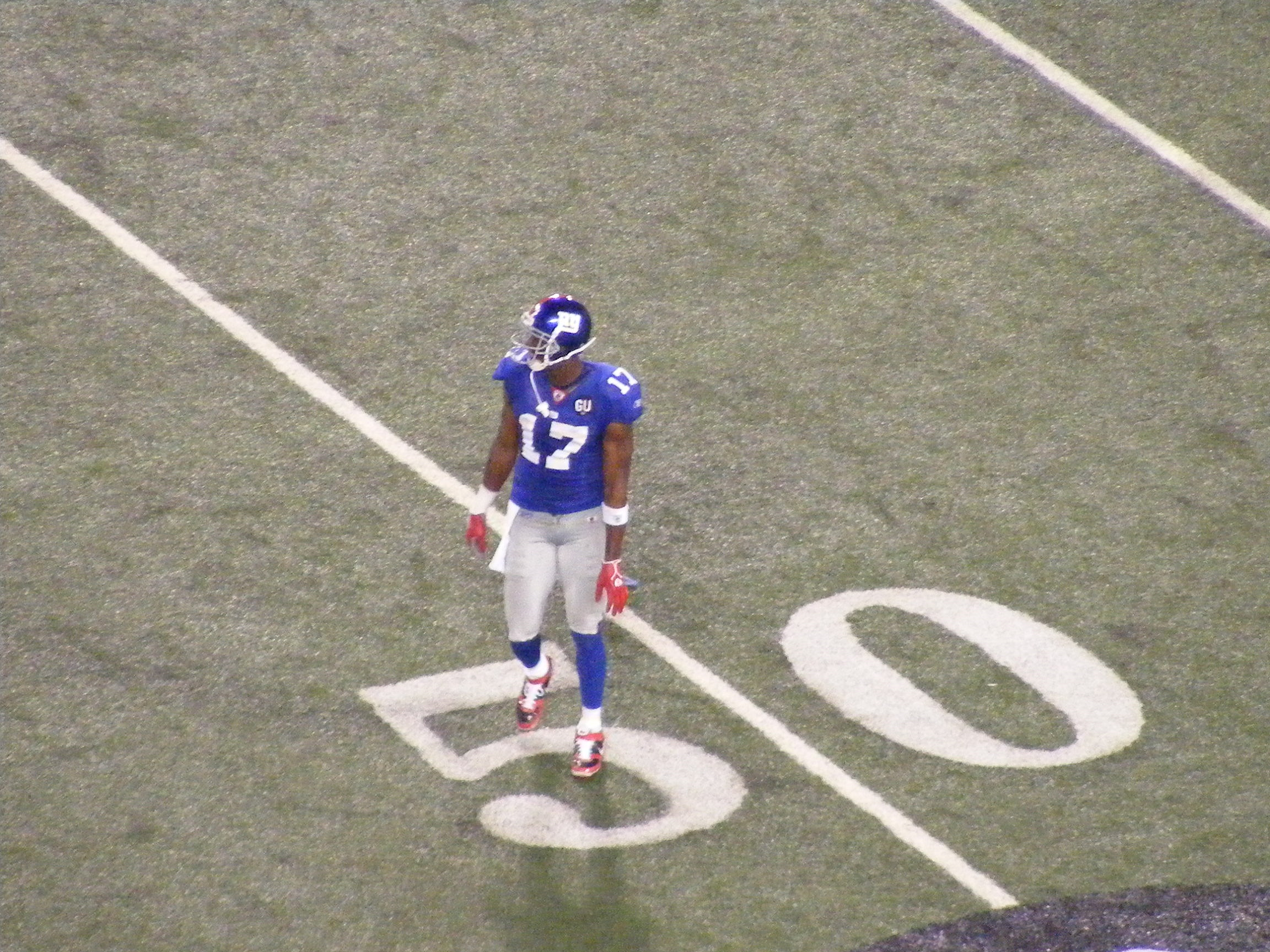
Plaxico Burress

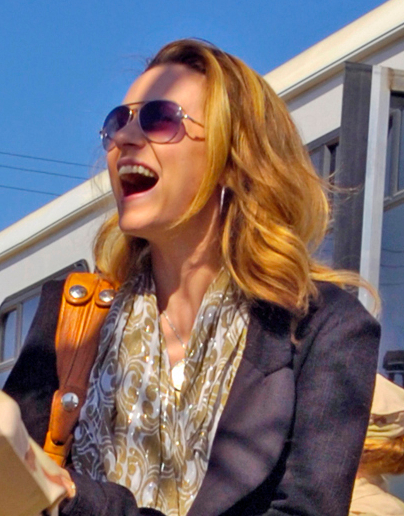
Hilarie Burton

- Bruce Bochy § – manager for Texas Rangers
- Rudy Boesch § – third-place finalist on Survivor: Pulau Tiga (first season)
- Bill Bolling § – lieutenant governor of Virginia
- Gary U.S. Bonds § – singer-songwriter
- J. Evan Bonifant – actor
- Olive Borden – actress
- Maria Boren – contestant on TV's The Apprentice
- Wes Borland – guitarist for Limp Bizkit and other bands
- Th-resa Bostick § – IFBB professional bodybuilder
- Luke Bowanko – center for the Jacksonville Jaguars
- Mary Bowser – freed slave who worked as Union spy during American Civil War, admitted to Military Intelligence Hall of Fame
- Jackie Bradley Jr. – center fielder for Boston Red Sox
- Ahmad Bradshaw (born 1986) – running back for New York Giants
- Karen Briggs § – violinist
- Antwain Britt (born 1978) – mixed martial artist
- Connie Britton § (born 1968) – actress; raised in Lynchburg
- Dave Brockie – founder of Gwar
- Aaron Brooks – football quarterback for Oakland Raiders
- Ahmad Brooks – professional football linebacker for San Francisco 49ers
- Chris Brown (born 1989) – singer and actor
- Duane Brown – offensive tackle for Houston Texans
- Pamela Brown (born 1983) - television anchor for CNN News
- Ruth Brown – Grammy Award-award-winning singer and entertainer
- Mika Brzezinski § – television news journalist at MSNBC
- Shannon Bream – lawyer and Journalist, attended Liberty University
- Bebe Buell – fashion model, groupie; mother of Liv Tyler
- Joyce Bulifant – television actress
- Sandra Bullock (born 1964) – actress
- Plaxico Burress (born 1977) – wide receiver for New York Jets
- Hilarie Burton – actress
- Jeff Burton (born 1967) – NASCAR driver
- Ward Burton (born 1961) – NASCAR driver
- Curtis Bush – world champion kickboxer and actor
- Jermon Bushrod – offensive tackle for Chicago Bears
- Deon Butler – professional football wide receiver for Seattle Seahawks; from Woodbridge
- Eddie Butler – starting pitcher for Colorado Rockies
- Martha Haines Butt (1833–1871) – author
- Charlie Byrd – jazz guitarist

== C ==
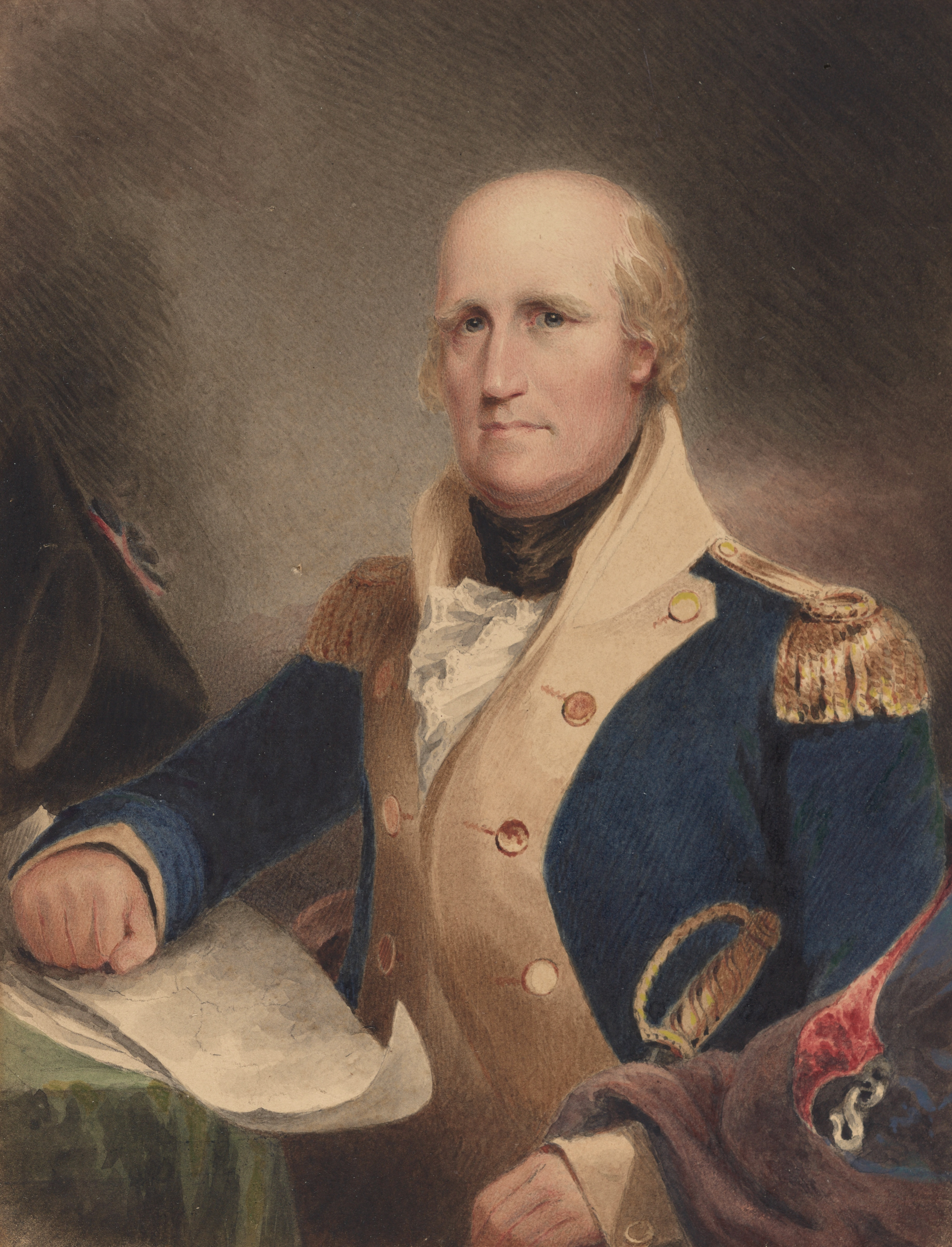
George Rogers Clark

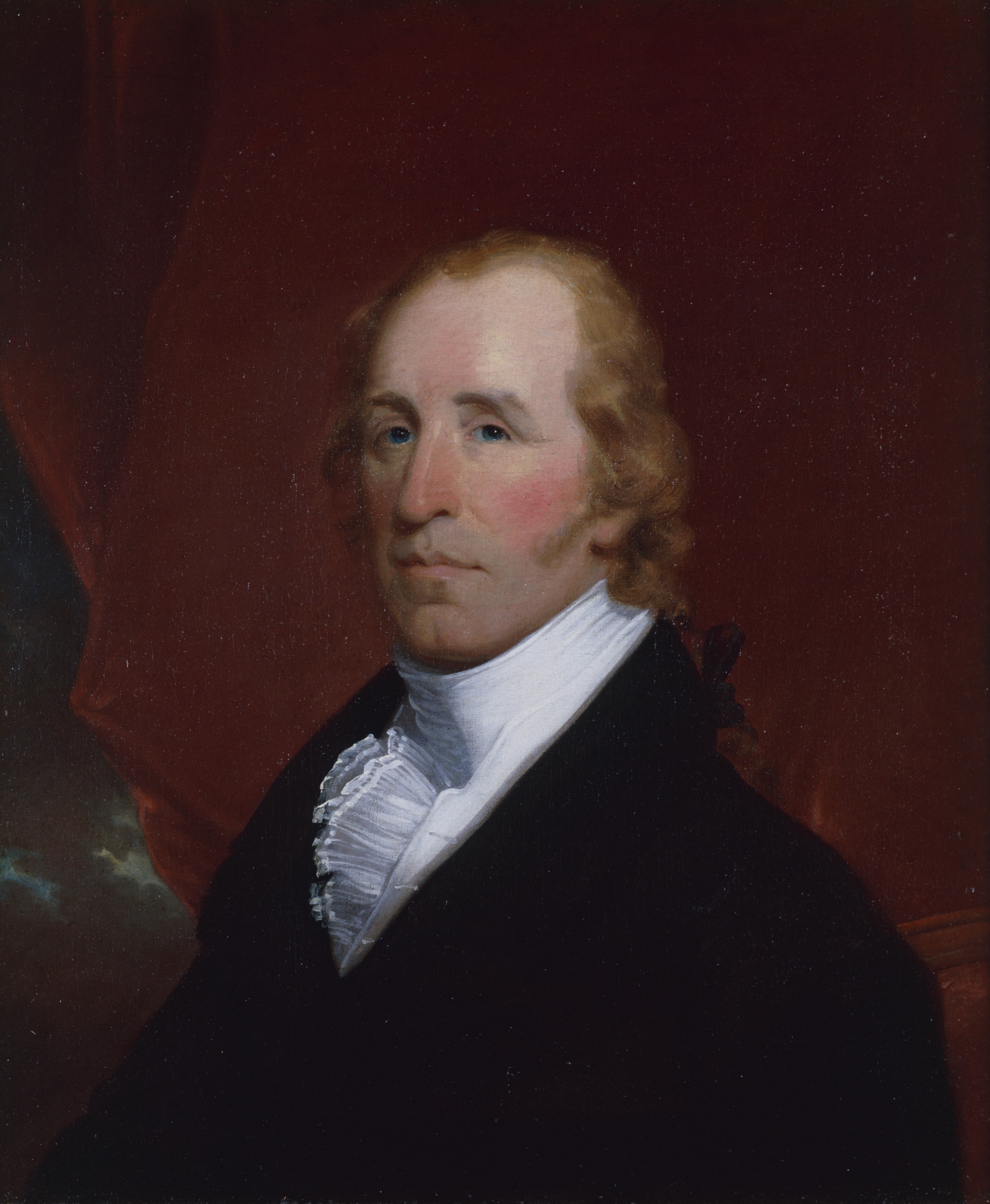
William Clark

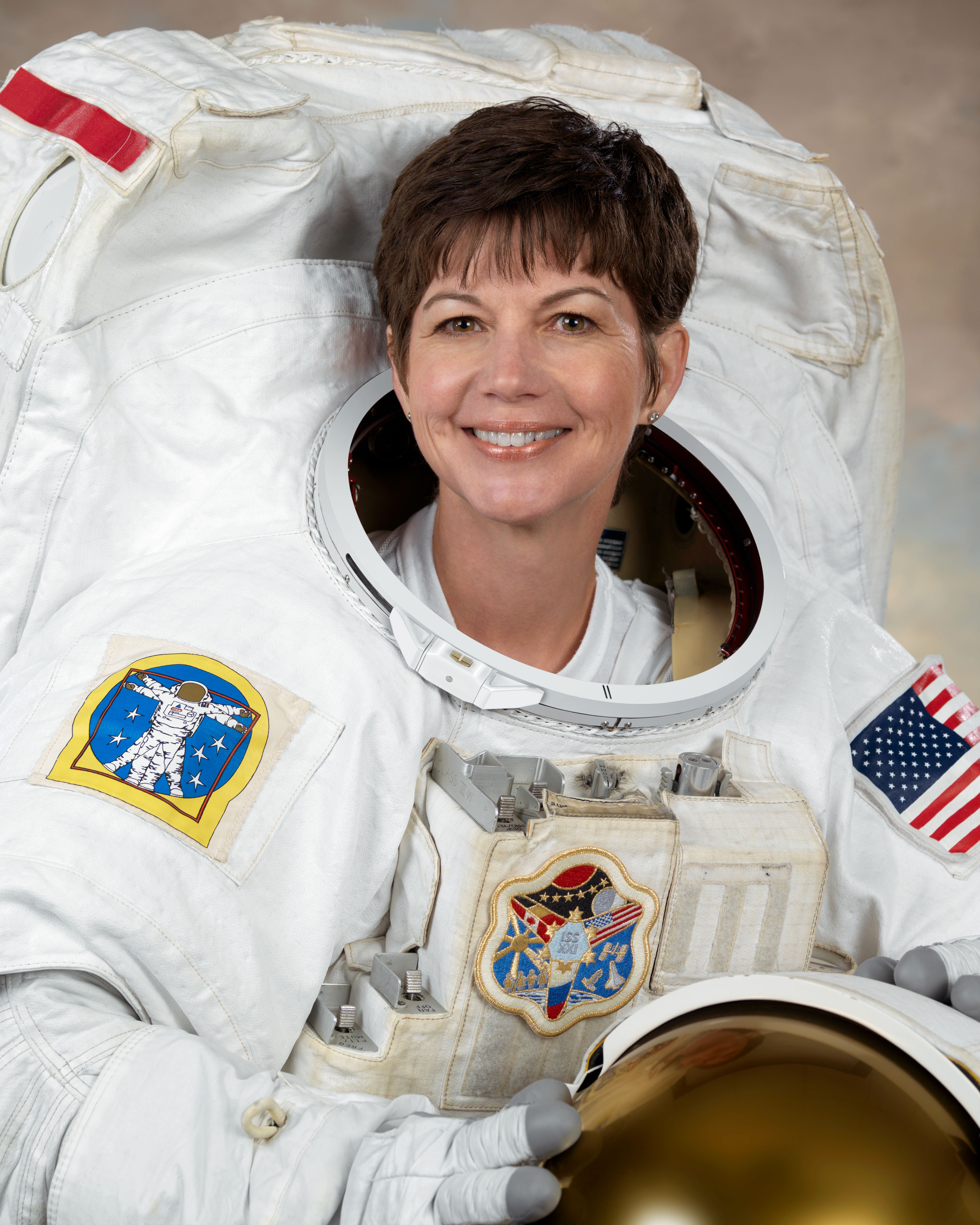
Catherine Coleman

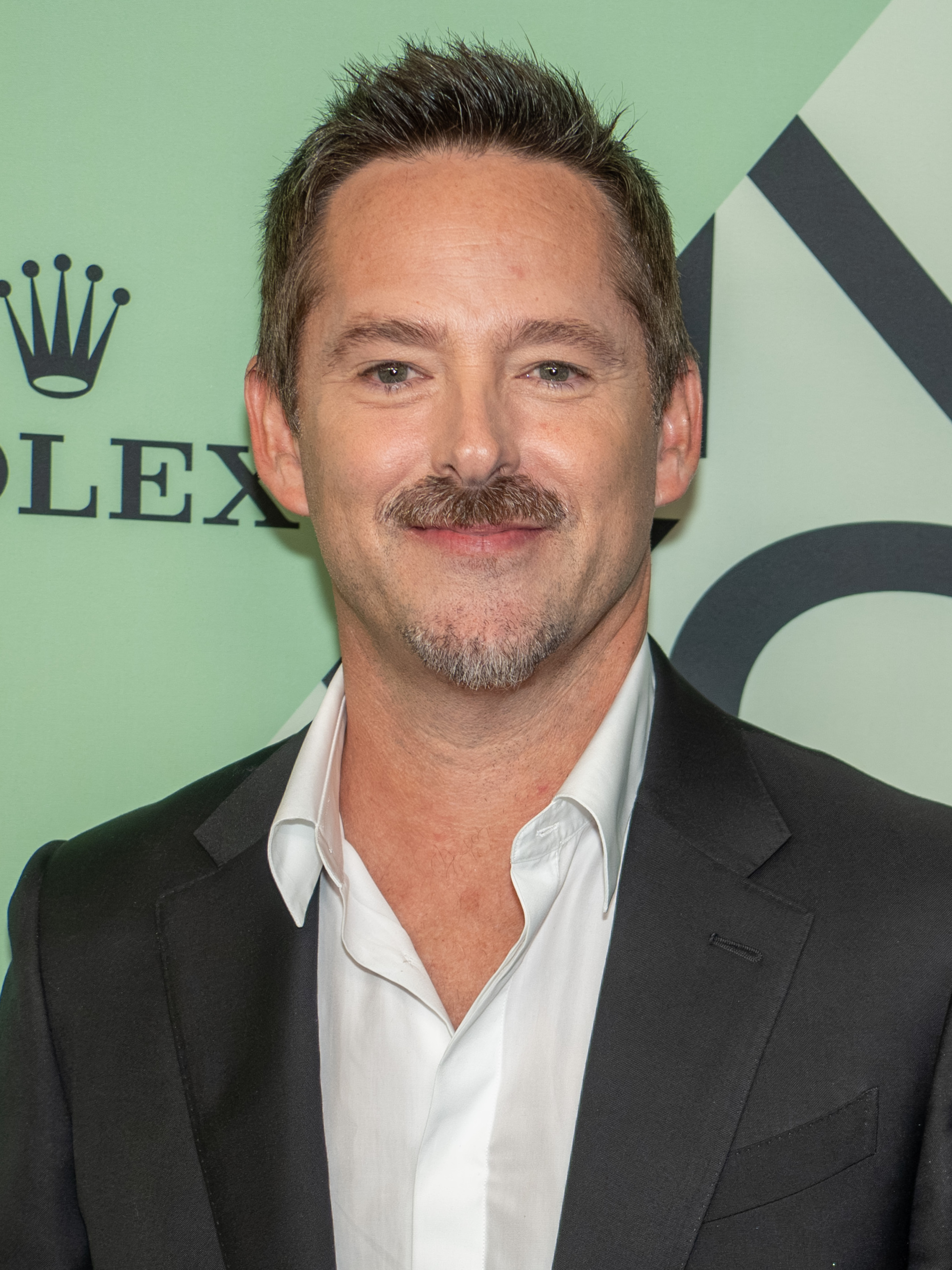
Scott Cooper

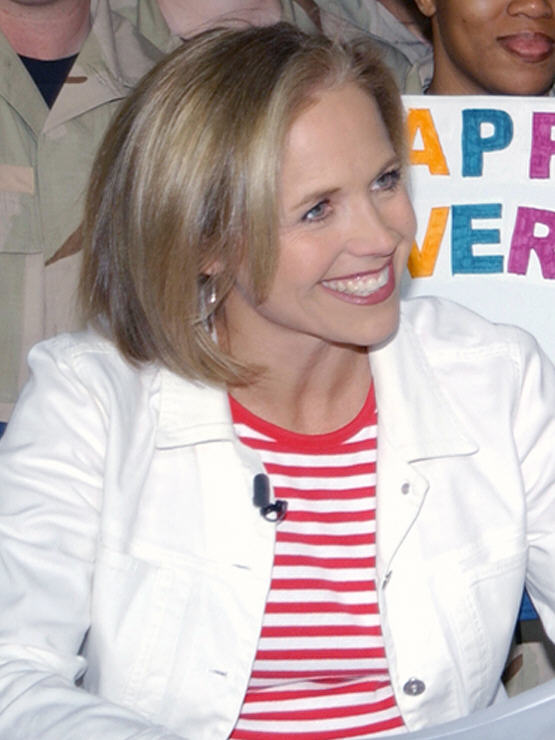
Katie Couric

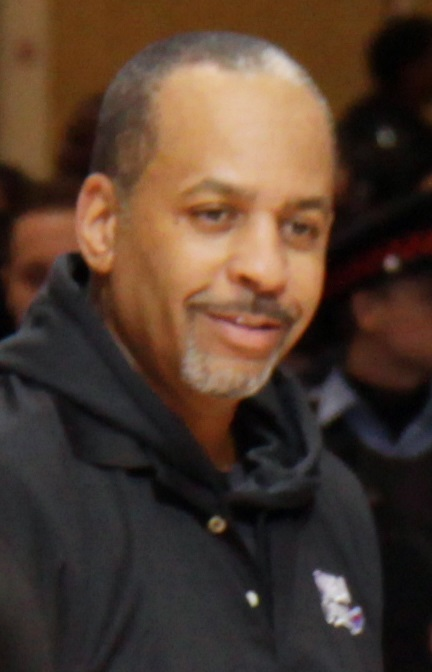
Dell Curry

- James Branch Cabell – author of fantasy fiction and belles lettres
- Erin Cahill – actress, Jen Scotts on Power Rangers Time Force
- Alyson Cambridge (born 1980) – operatic soprano and classical music, jazz, and American popular song singer
- Shawn Camp – relief pitcher for Toronto Blue Jays
- John Campbell – bassist for Lamb of God
- Eric Cantor – member of the United States House of Representatives representing Virginia's 7th congressional district
- Steve Cardenas – martial artist, actor, Rocky DeSantos on Mighty Morphin Power Rangers, Power Rangers: Zeo
- Lott Carey – early African-American colonist and missionary to Liberia
- Jay Carney – White House Press Secretary under U.S. President Barack Obama
- A. P. Carter – musician, singer-songwriter; member of Carter Family
- Allen 'Big Al' Carter – painter, photographer, sculptor and teacher
- Maybelle Carter – guitarist, singer, member of Carter Family; mother of June Carter Cash
- Robert "King" Carter I (1663–1732) – wealthy colonist businessman
- Sara Carter (1898–1979) – country music singer
- Alan-Michael Cash – defensive tackle for Montreal Alouettes
- June Carter Cash (1929–2003) – singer-songwriter, actress and comedian; member of Carter Family, second wife of Johnny Cash
- Anthony Castonzo § – NFL player
- Jake Cave (born 1992) – outfielder for the Minnesota Twins
- Christina Chambers (born 1969) – actress and model, One Life to Live, Sunset Beach
- Kam Chancellor (born 1988) – strong safety for Seattle Seahawks
- David Chang – restaurateur
- Anthony Clark – actor (television sitcoms Yes, Dear and Boston Common); born in Lynchburg
- Florence Anderson Clark (1835–1918) – university librarian and administrator
- George Rogers Clark (1752–1818) – American Revolutionary War military leader
- William Clark (1770–1838) – explorer (Lewis and Clark Expedition); brother of George Rogers Clark
- Roy Clark – country musician born in Meherrin, Virginia
- Henry Clay (1777–1852) – 19th-century statesman
- Clarence Clemons (1942–2011) – saxophonist for Bruce Springsteen's E Street Band, played football for Norfolk Neptunes
- Patsy Cline (1932–1963) – singer
- Jim Coates – former MLB pitcher, primarily with New York Yankees
- Sarah Johnson Cocke – writer and civic leader
- Coko – member of SWV, gospel music singer
- Catherine Coleman § (born 1960) – NASA astronaut
- Matt Coleman III (born 1998) – basketball player for Hapoel Haifa of the Israeli Basketball Premier League
- Francis Collins – physician-geneticist, director of National Institutes of Health
- Mike Compton – NFL player
- Stacy Compton – NASCAR driver and team owner; born in Hurt
- Kavell Conner – linebacker for Indianapolis Colts
- Matthew Continetti – journalist, editor-in-chief of The Washington Free Beacon
- Scott Cooper – actor, writer, director
- Michael Copon – actor, Lucas Kendall in Power Rangers: Time Force
- Leanza Cornett – Miss America, actress, TV commentator
- Alex Cosmidis – baseball player, manager, scout
- Joseph Cotten (1905–1994) – actor
- Patricia Cornwell § – novelist
- Katie Couric (born 1957) – television personality
- Michael Covel – author and documentarian
- Robert Cray § (born 1953) – blues musician
- Henry Creamer – vaudeville song lyricist
- Zach Cregger – actor
- Romeo Crennel (born 1947) – NFL coach
- Kyle Crockett (born 1991) – MLB pitcher
- Amanda Cromwell – professional soccer coach and former player
- Adrian Cronauer § – disc jockey
- Michael Cuddyer (born 1979) – MLB outfielder
- Elizabeth Litchfield Cunnyngham – missionary and church worker
- Dell Curry (born 1964) – former NBA player for the Charlotte Hornets; father of Golden State Warriors superstar Stephen Curry

== D ==
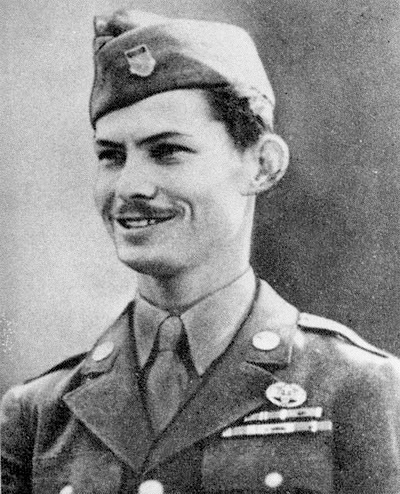
Desmond Doss

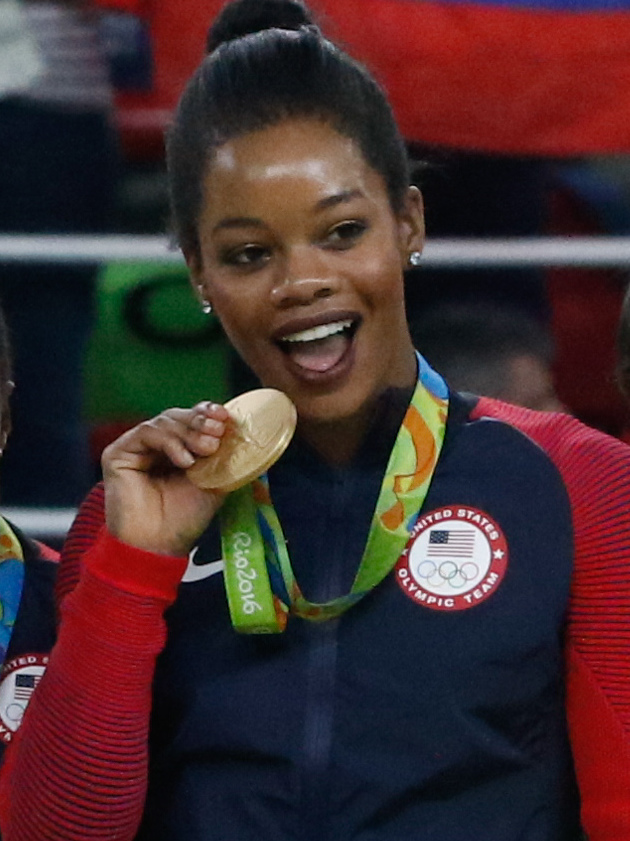
Gabby Douglas

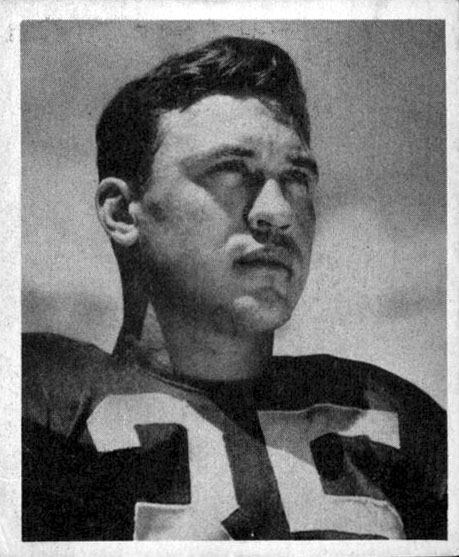
Bill Dudley

- D'Angelo – R&B musician
- Dan Daniel – politician, 39th National Commander of American Legion
- Troy Daniels – shooting guard for Charlotte Hornets
- Colgate Whitehead Darden Jr. – governor of Virginia, chancellor of the College of William & Mary and president of the University of Virginia
- Wendy Dascomb – Miss USA 1969
- Chris Daughtry § (born 1979) – American Idol finalist; attended high school in Charlottesville
- Ed Davis § – power forward for Toronto Raptors; attended Benedictine High School in Richmond
- Tanya Davis – artist and past president of the Torpedo Factory Artists Association
- Tyrone Davis – NFL tight end, primarily with Green Bay Packers
- John M. Dawson (1829–1913) – minister and Virginia senator
- Jimmy Dean – singer, actor, television personality and "sausage king"
- Serena Deeb – professional wrestler
- Dalvin DeGrate – singer, member of R&B group Jodeci
- Evelyn Magruder DeJarnette (1842–1914) – author
- DeSagana Diop § – center for Charlotte Bobcats; attended Oak Hill Academy in Mouth of Wilson
- Junie Donlavey – owner and namesake of NASCAR "Donlavey" racing team
- Eric Dorsey § – defensive end for New York Giants; attended high school in McLean
- Desmond Doss – United States Army corporal who served as a combat medic during World War II
- Gabby Douglas – artistic gymnast and Olympic gold medalist
- Fanny Murdaugh Downing (1831–1894) – author and poet
- Bill Dudley (1921–2010) – former NFL halfback, member of the College Football Hall of Fame and Pro Football Hall of Fame
- Eliza Ann Dupuy (c. 1814 – 1880) – littérateur and author
- Kevin Durant § – All-Star small forward for NBA champion Golden State Warriors; attended Oak Hill Academy in Mouth of Wilson

== E ==
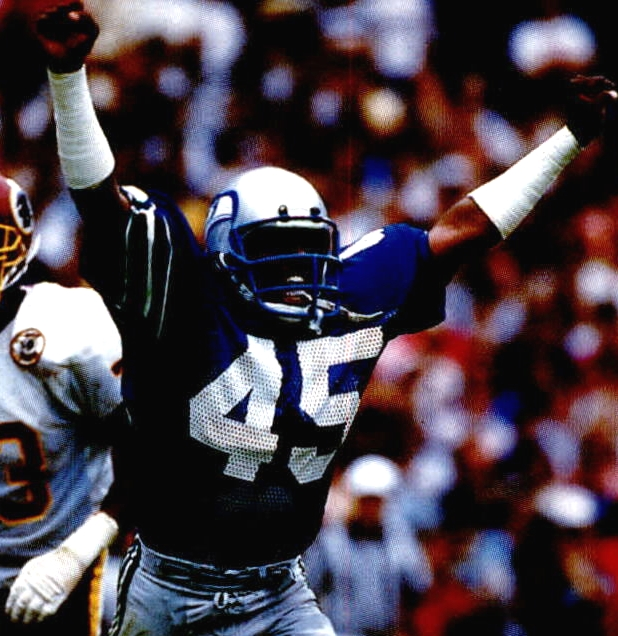
Kenny Easley

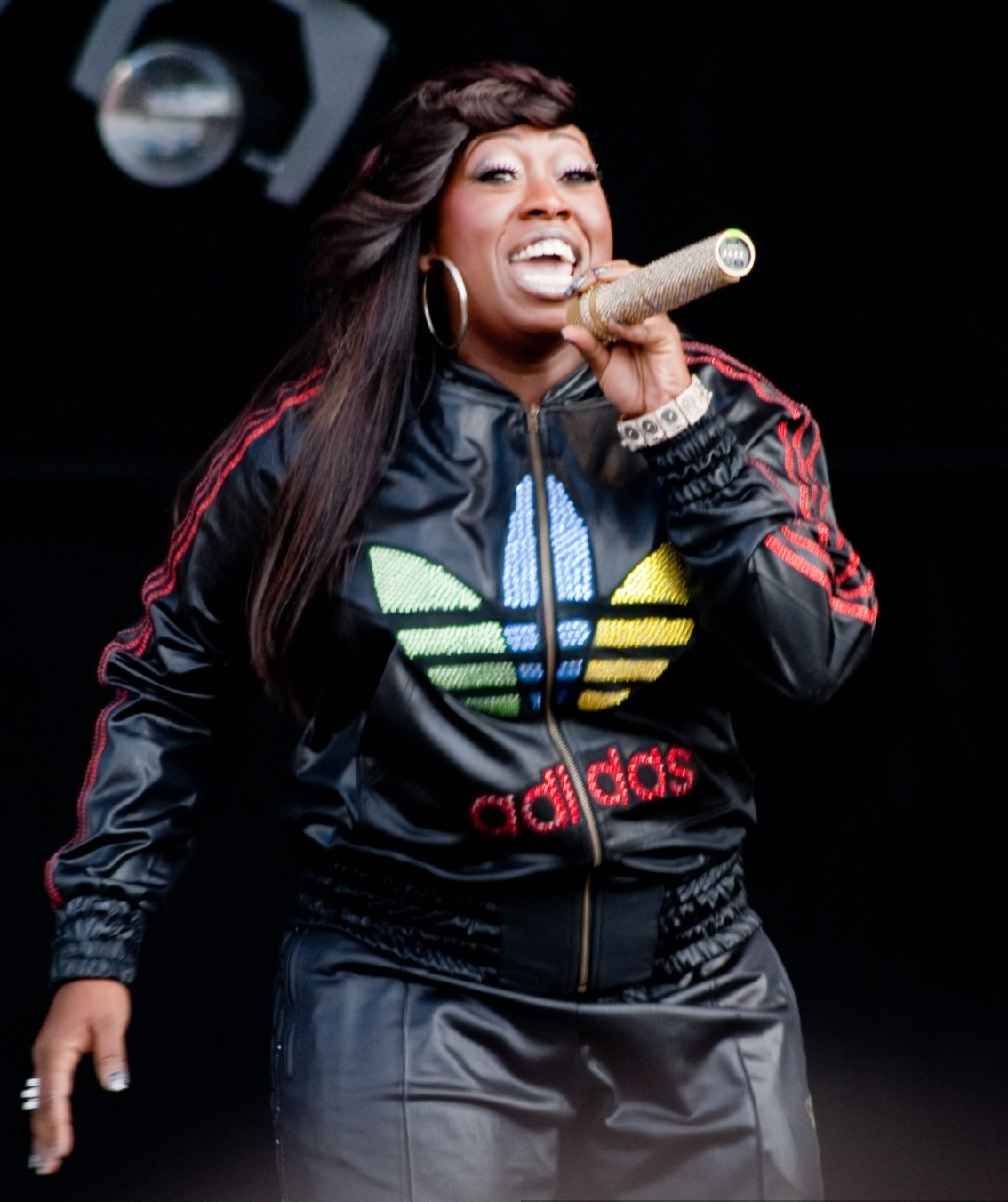
Missy Elliott

- Kenny Easley (born 1959) – NFL safety for the Seattle Seahawks, member of the College Football Hall of Fame and Pro Football Hall of Fame
- Ferrell Edmunds (born 1965) – NFL tight end
- Tremaine Edmunds (born 1998) – NFL linebacker
- Terrell Edmunds (born 1997) – NFL safety
- Trey Edmunds (born 1994) – NFL running back
- Elizabeth Edwards § (1949–2010) – attorney, author; estranged wife to John Edwards
- Missy Elliott (born 1971) – rapper
- Perry Ellis (1940–1986) – fashion designer
- Brother Claude Ely (1922–1978) – singer-songwriter, Pentecostal Holiness preacher
- Phillip H. Emerson (1834–1889) – justice of the Supreme Court of the Utah Territory 1873–1885
- Garrett Epps (born 1950) – legal scholar, novelist, journalist
- Victoria Espinel (born 1968) – intellectual property enforcement coordinator under U.S. President Barack Obama
- Charles Esten § (born 1965) – comedian, actor and singer

== F ==
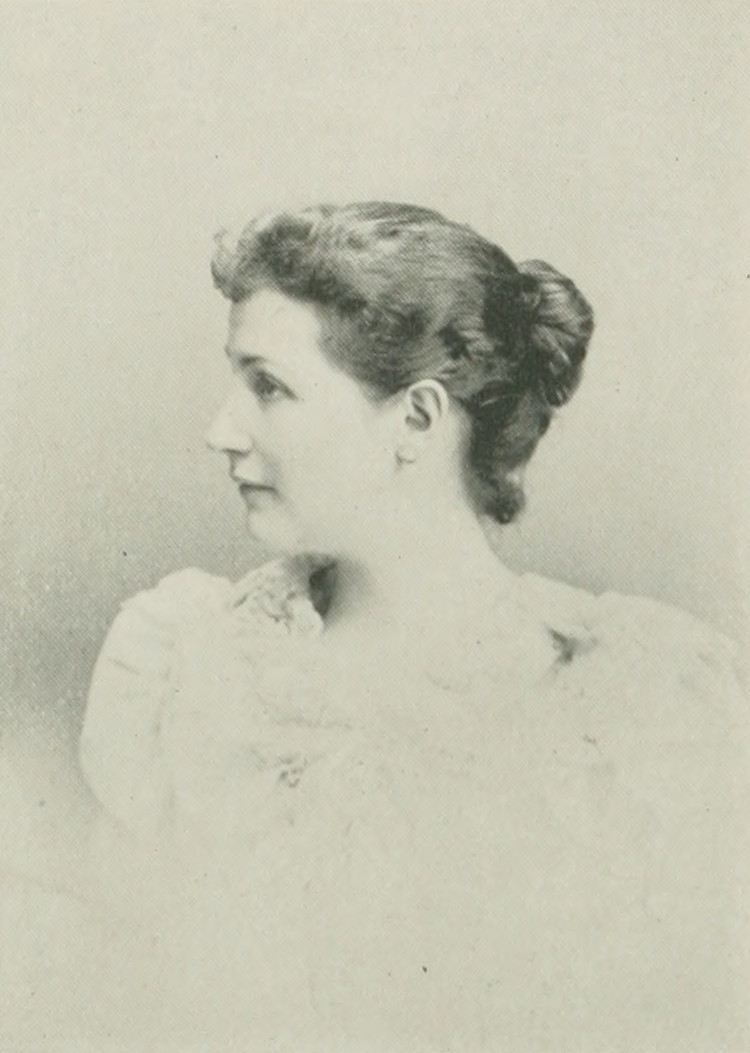
Bessie Alexander Ficklen

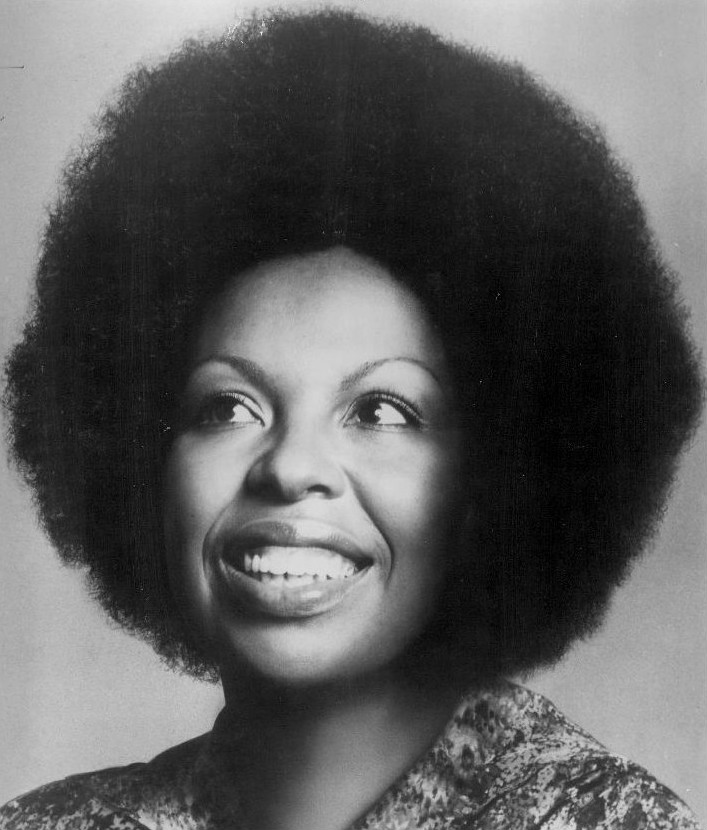
Roberta Flack

- Jonny Fairplay – Survivor: Pearl Islands contestant and professional wrestler
- Frankie Faison – film actor
- Jerry Falwell (1933–2007) – Christian minister, televangelist, and political activist (Moral Majority)
- James Farrior – NFL linebacker
- William Faulkner § (1897–1962) – author, writer-in-residence at University of Virginia from 1957 until his death
- Florian-Ayala Fauna – artist, musician, music producer
- Mimi Faust – reality TV personality
- Justin Fairfax (1979–2026) – lieutenant governor of Virginia
- Bessie Alexander Ficklen (1861–1945) – poet and artist
- Dorian Finney-Smith – NBA player for Dallas Mavericks
- Ella Fitzgerald (1917–1996) – jazz singer
- Roberta Flack § – Grammy Award-winning singer-songwriter, musician
- Gary Fleder – film director, screenwriter, producer
- Charles Follis – first African-American professional football player
- Jon Foreman – lead singer for rock band Switchfoot
- Tim Foreman – bass player for rock band Switchfoot
- Chip Franklin – comedian and talk show host

== G ==
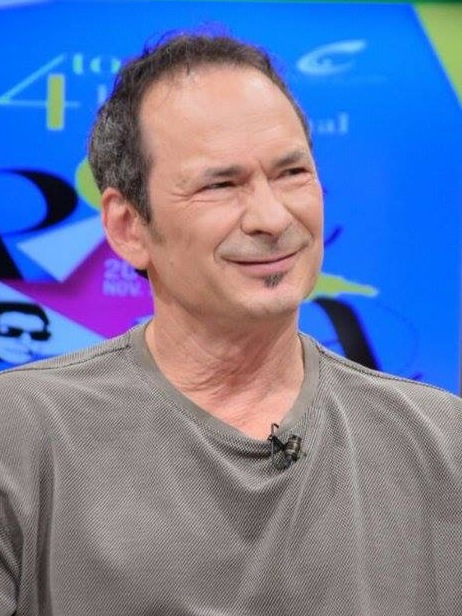
Forrest Gander

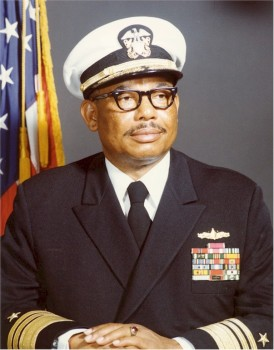
Samuel L. Gravely Jr.

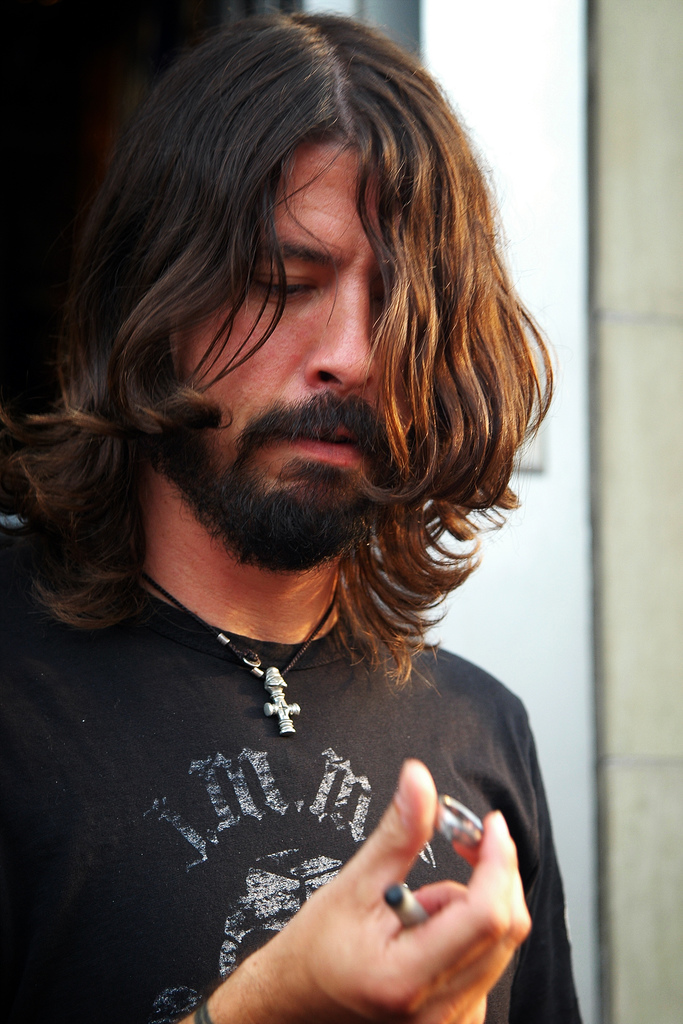
David Grohl

- Lea Gabrielle (born 1975) – journalist and correspondent, Fox News Channel
- Forrest Gander § (born 1956) – poet, essayist and translator
- Greg Garcia – director, producer, creator of sitcoms Raising Hope and My Name Is Earl, co-creator of Yes, Dear
- Clifton Garvin – chief executive officer of Exxon 1975–1986
- Gray Gaulding – NASCAR driver
- Azita Ghanizada § – actress, Saira Batra on General Hospital: Night Shift
- William D. Gibbons – Baptist minister
- William Gibson § – cyberpunk author; coined the term 'cyberspace'
- Vince Gilligan – director, producer, creator of Breaking Bad
- Jim Gilmore – governor of Virginia
- Sheila Giolitti – artist and art dealer
- Jack Gilpin – actor
- Ellen Glasgow – early 20th-century novelist
- Indur M. Goklany – science and technology policy analyst for U.S. Department of the Interior
- Irving Gottesman – professor and professor emeritus at University of Virginia
- Lauren Graham – actress, comedy-drama series Gilmore Girls
- Samuel Gravely – African-American officer who broke many racial barriers in U.S. Navy
- Justin Grimm § – relief pitcher for Chicago Cubs
- David Grohl – musician with Foo Fighters; moved to Virginia at age three
- Johnny Grubb – Major League Baseball player
- Kevin Grubb – NASCAR driver
- Wayne Grubb – NASCAR crew chief and former driver
- Grant Gustin – actor best known for his role as The Flash in the superhero TV series of the same name; born in Norfolk
- Brandon Guyer § – outfielder for Cleveland Indians

== H ==
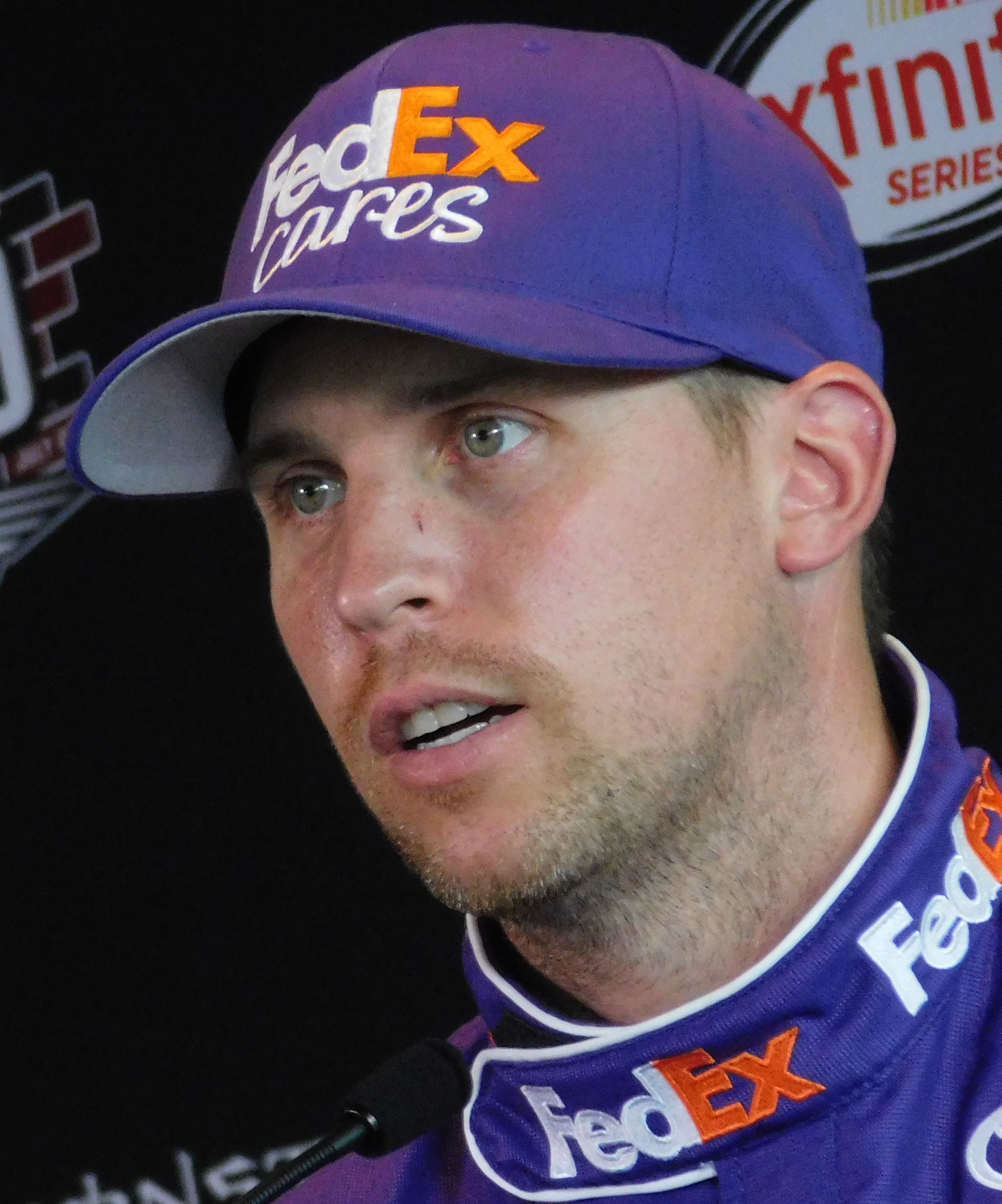
Denny Hamlin

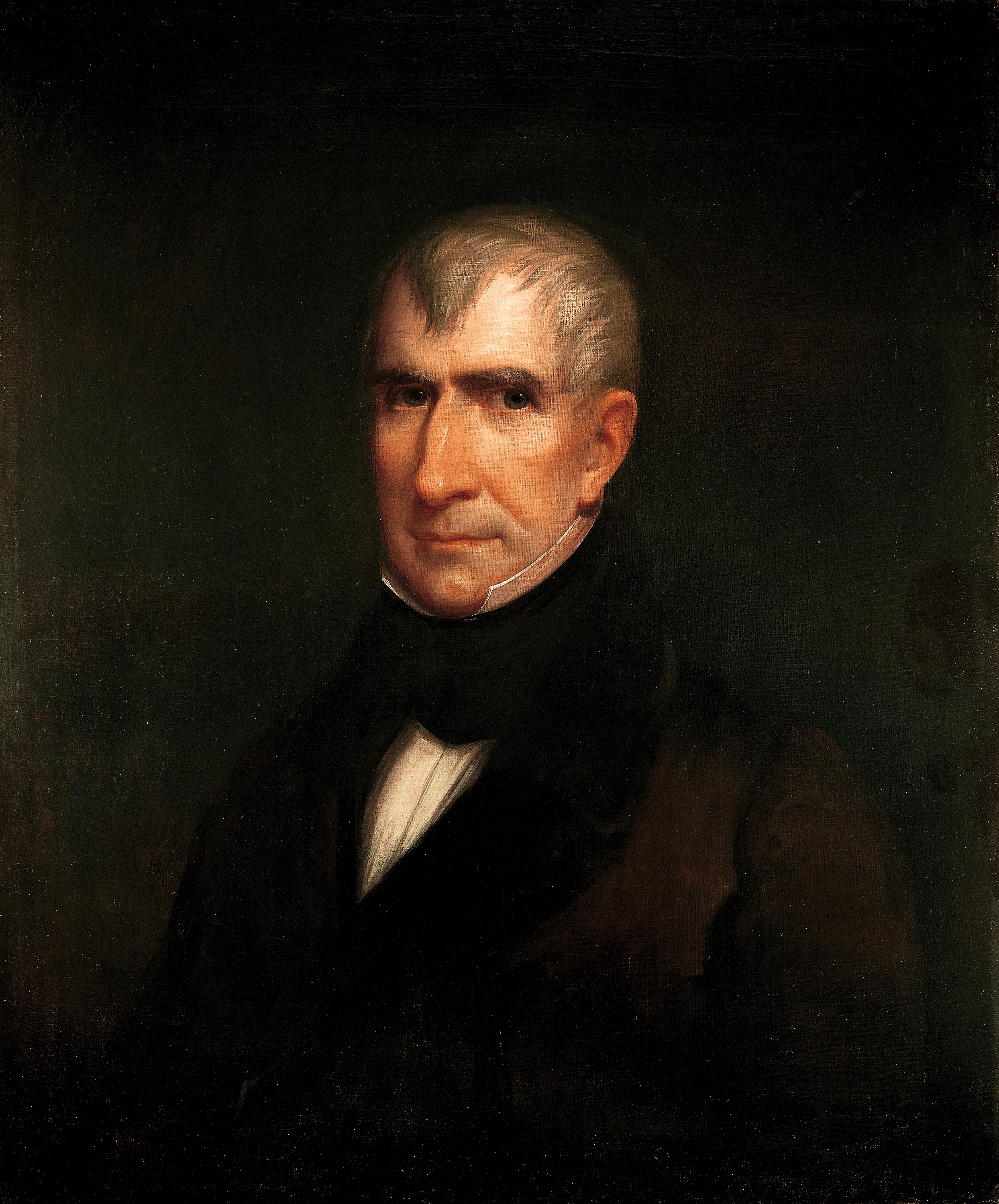
William Henry Harrison

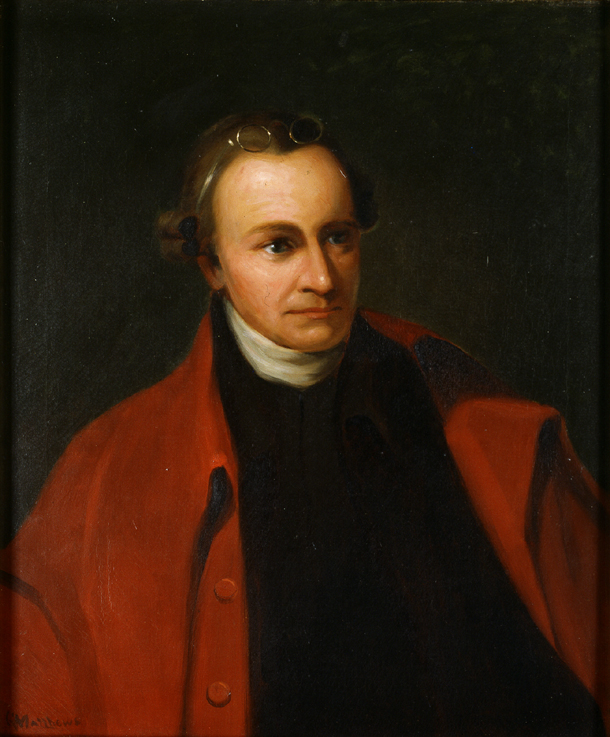
Patrick Henry

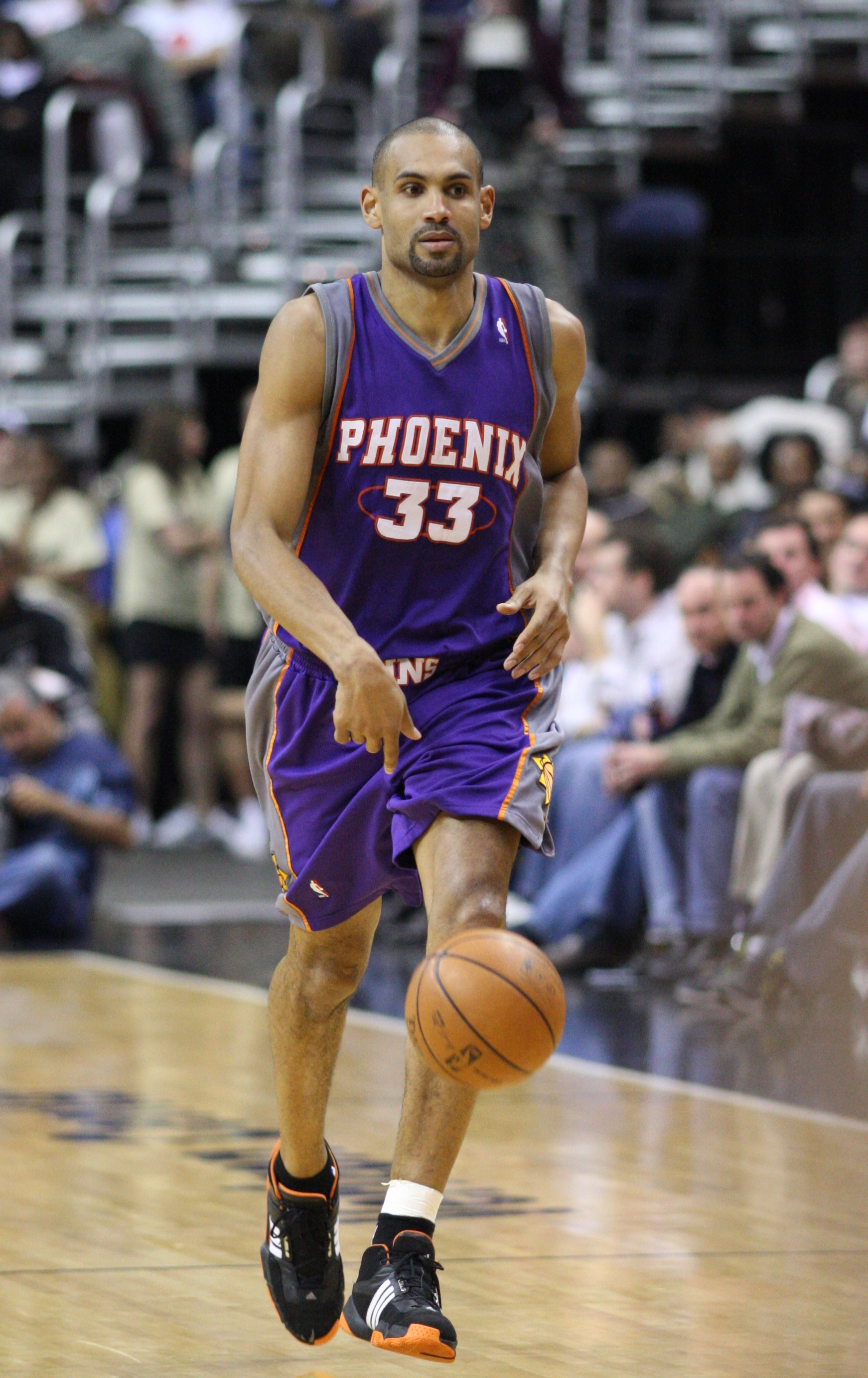
Grant Hill

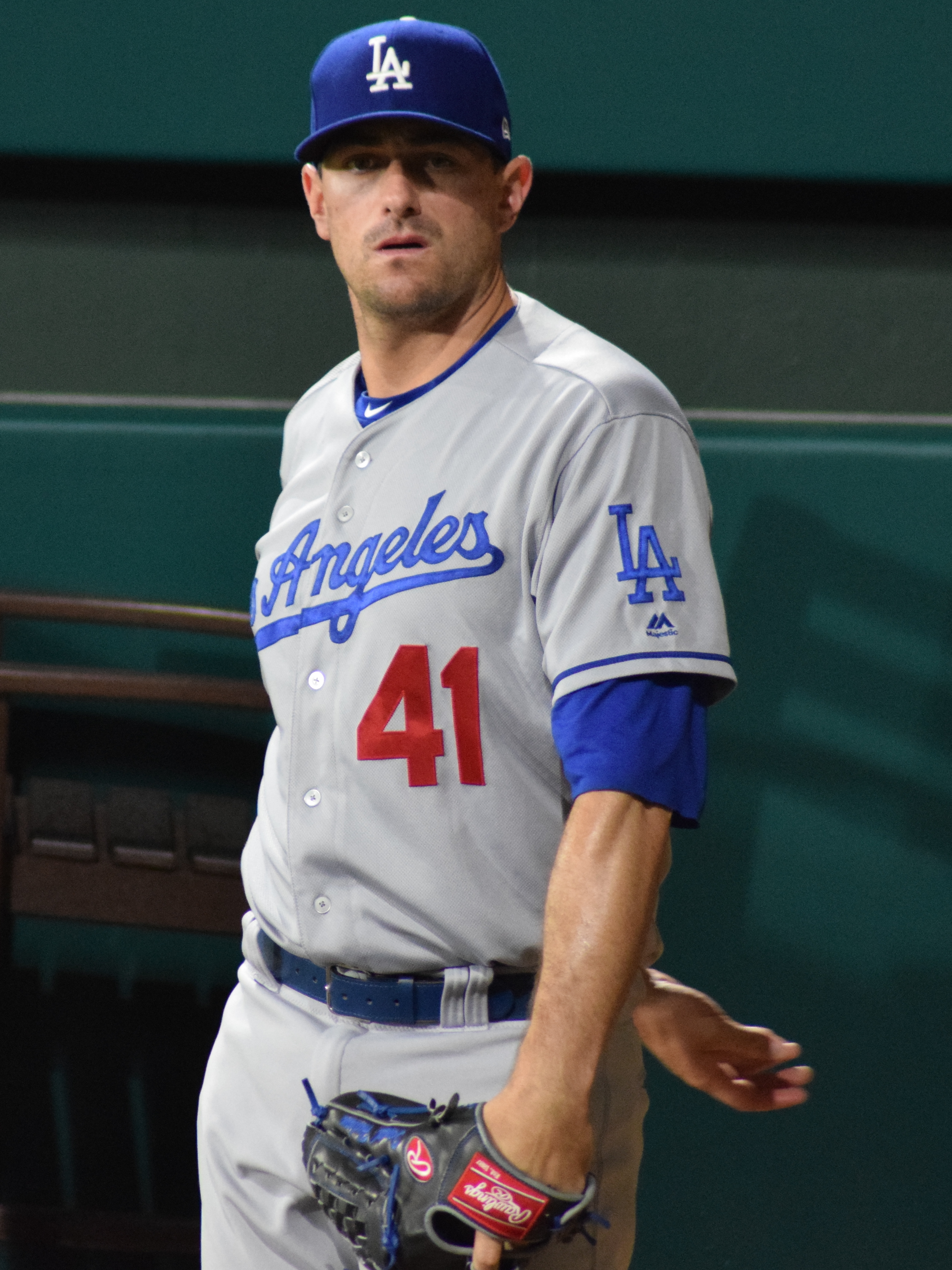
Daniel Hudson

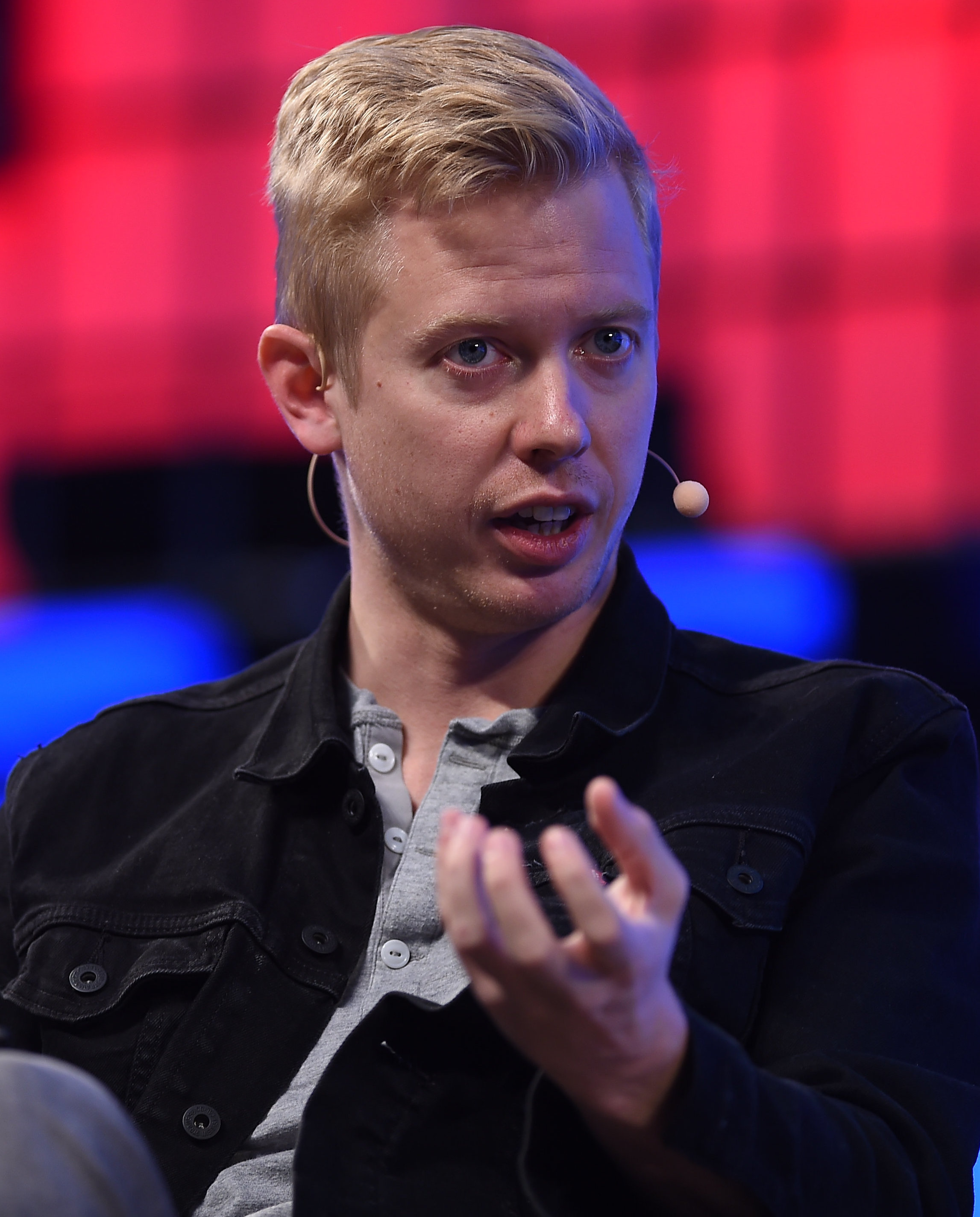
Steve Huffman

- Hilary Hahn (born 1979) – two-time Grammy Award-winning violinist
- Charlie Hales § (born 1956) – mayor of Portland, Oregon
- Charles Haley – football player for Dallas Cowboys, San Francisco 49ers; born in Gladys
- DeAngelo Hall § (born 1983) – cornerback for Washington Redskins
- Fawn Hall (born 1959) – figure in Iran–Contra affair
- Mark Hamill § (born 1951) – actor, known for Star Wars films; attended high school in Annandale
- Peter Hamby § (born 1981) – journalist; attended high school in Richmond
- Denny Hamlin (born 1980) – NASCAR driver, 2006 rookie of the year, and Three time Daytona 500 winner; grew up in Chesterfield
- Zac Hanson (born 1985) – member of pop band Hanson
- Jason Butler Harner § (born 1970) – actor
- Eli Harold (born 1994) – linebacker for San Francisco 49ers
- Justin Harper (born 1989) – power forward for Orlando Magic
- Benjamin Harrison – 23rd president of the United States; grandson of William Henry Harrison
- Benjamin Harrison V – signer of the Declaration of Independence, father of U.S. President William Henry Harrison
- Carl Hairston (born 1952) – NFL player, Super Bowl champion
- William Henry Harrison (1773–1841) – 9th president of the United States
- Kathryn Harrold (born 1950) – actress
- Bryan Harvey – musician; known for fronting role in House of Freaks; murdered with family in 2006
- Percy Harvin – NFL wide receiver
- Nidal Hasan – U.S. Army psychiatrist; sole suspect in Fort Hood shooting of 2009
- Frank Hassell (born 1988) – basketball player
- Earl Hebner – professional wrestling referee
- Mike Helton – vice chairman of NASCAR
- William Henderson – fullback for Green Bay Packers
- Lauri Hendler – actress, Gimme a Break!
- Rick Hendrick – NASCAR Cup Series team owner for Chase Elliott, Jimmie Johnson, Alex Bowman, and William Byron; born in South Hill
- Molly Henneberg (born 1973) – reporter for Fox News
- Patrick Henry (1736–1799) – American Revolution figure and first governor of Virginia after nation's independence
- Kate Higgins (born 1969) – anime voice actor
- Grant Hill § (born 1972) – basketball player, Olympic gold medalist, 7-time NBA All-Star
- Oliver Hill (1907–2007) – lawyer
- Laura Hillenbrand (born 1967) – author of books and magazine articles
- Skip Hinnant (born 1940) – actor, The Electric Company
- Mary Evelyn Hitchcock (1849–1920) – author and explorer
- Wendell and Sherman Holmes – blues, gospel and roots musicians
- David Homyk – musician
- Grace Hopper § (1906–1992) – pioneering computer scientist, and United States Navy rear admiral
- Constance Horner (born 1942) – public official in Reagan and first Bush administrations; independent director of Pfizer, Prudential Financial, and Ingersoll Rand; resides in Lexington
- Bruce Hornsby (born 1954) – musician
- Ralph Horween (1896–1997) – Harvard Crimson and NFL football player, centenarian
- Quin Houff (born 1997) – NASCAR driver
- Sam Houston (1793–1863) – born in Rockbridge County; governor of Tennessee (1827–1829); first and third president of Republic of Texas; governor of Texas; U.S. senator from Texas
- David Huddleston (1930–2016) – actor, The Big Lebowski, Blazing Saddles
- Juliet Huddy § (born 1969) – Fox News news anchor; attended high school in McLean
- Daniel Hudson (born 1987) – closer for Washington Nationals
- Steve Huffman (born 1983) – co-founder and CEO of Reddit
- Chad Hugo (born 1974) – musician and music producer, one-half of The Neptunes
- Patrick Hull – entrepreneur based in Richmond
- Randy Hundley – catcher for Chicago Cubs
- Al Hunt – columnist for Bloomberg View
- Robert Hurt (born 1969) – U.S. representative of Virginia's 5th congressional district

== I ==
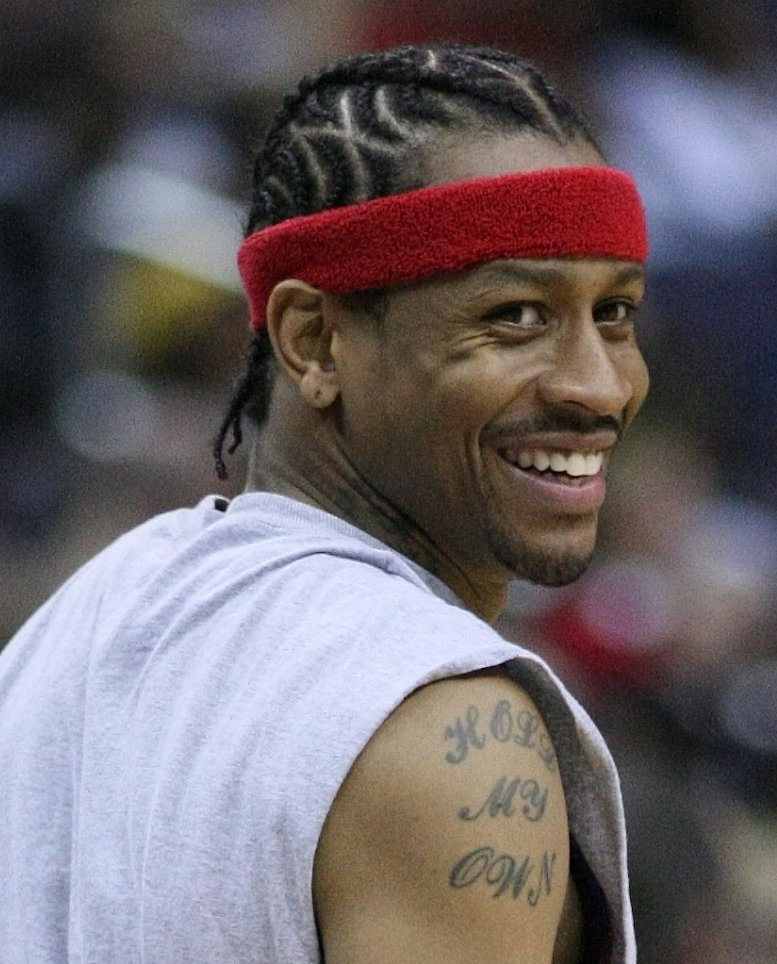
Allen Iverson

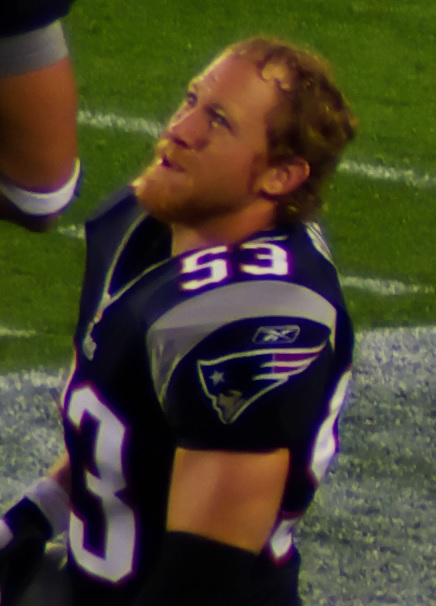
Larry Izzo

- Ashley Iaconetti (born 1988) – television personality
- Arsalan Iftikhar (born 1977) – human rights lawyer, global media commentator, and author
- Brandon Inge (born 1977) – MLB player; from Lynchburg
- James Addison Ingle (1867–1903) § – American missionary to China
- Mike Imoh (born 1984) – former Virginia Tech and Canadian Football League running back
- Andre Ingram (born 1985) – NBA player, NBA G League record holder for most games played
- Jay M. Ipson (born 1935) § – Holocaust survivor and co-founder of the Virginia Holocaust Museum
- Daryl Irvine (born 1964) – former MLB relief pitcher
- Allen Iverson (born 1975) – former NBA player for the Philadelphia 76ers, Denver Nuggets, Memphis Grizzlies, and Detroit Pistons
- Mark Ivey (born 1973) – college football coach
- Larry Izzo (born 1974) – NFL player, coach

== J ==
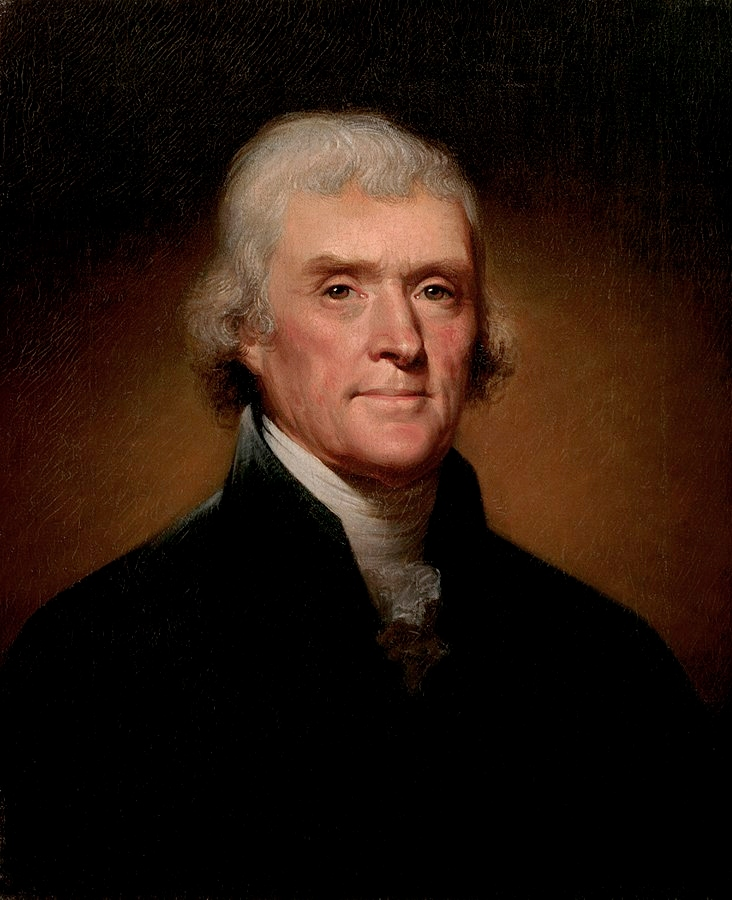
Thomas Jefferson

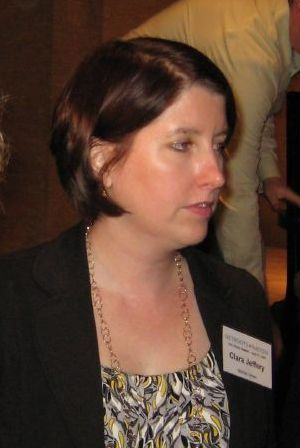
Clara Jeffery

- Thomas "Stonewall" Jackson § (1824–1863) – Confederate military leader; born and raised in Clarksburg, West Virginia (which was formerly Virginia)
- Mickie James (born 1979) – professional wrestler and musician
- Tommy Lee James – country music songwriter and record producer
- Thomas Jefferson (1743–1826) – 3rd president of the United States, author of Declaration of Independence, founder of University of Virginia
- Clara Jeffery § (born 1967) – co-editor of Mother Jones magazine
- Rashad Jennings (born 1985) – running back for New York Giants
- Jim Jinkins – cartoonist
- Cornelius Johnson (born 1943) – NFL guard, won Super Bowl V with Baltimore Colts
- Nicole Johnson (born c. 1974) – Miss America 1999
- Wes Johnson – actor and comedian
- Maria I. Johnston (1835–1921) – author, journalist, editor and lecturer
- Arrington Jones (born 1959) – running back for San Francisco 49ers
- Julius Jones (born 1981) – football player for Dallas Cowboys, Seattle Seahawks
- Thomas Jones (born 1978) – running back for Kansas City Chiefs
- Akeem Jordan (born 1985) – linebacker for Philadelphia Eagles
- Cornelia J. M. Jordan (1830–1898) – poet and lyricist
- Henry Jordan (1935–1977) – lineman for Green Bay Packers, member of Pro Football Hall of Fame
- Orlando Jordan – professional wrestler
- Samuel Jordan (died 1621) – earliest Virginia leader at Jamestown Settlement

== K ==
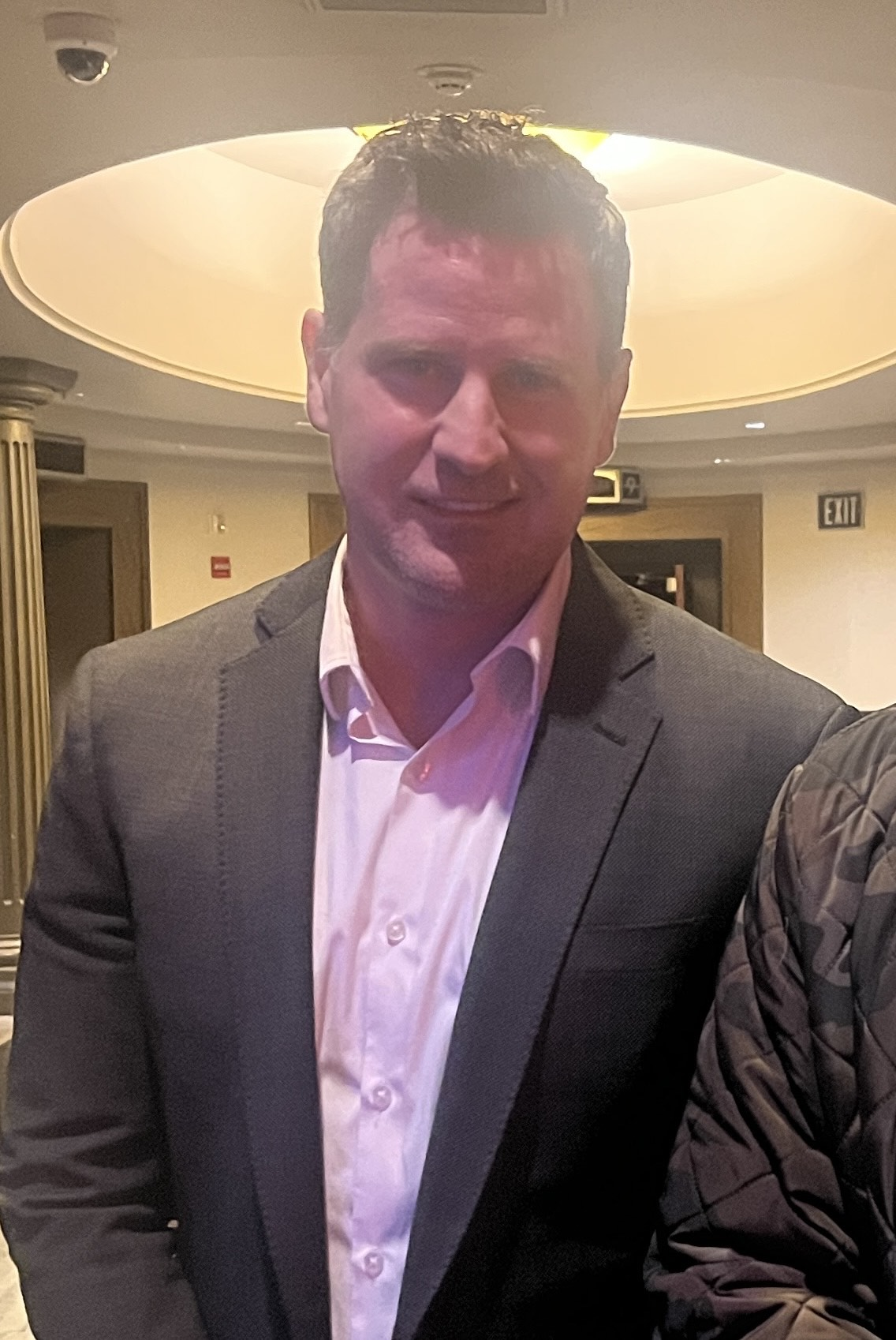
Richard Kelly

- Tim Kaine § (born 1958) – former governor and current U.S. senator, 2016 Democratic nominee for vice president under Hillary Clinton
- Archie Kao § – actor and director
- Josh Kaufman § (born 1976) – soul singer-songwriter, winner of NBC's The Voice season 6; attended Blacksburg High School
- Jeremy Kapinos § (born 1984) – punter for Pittsburgh Steelers
- Richard Kelly (born 1975) – film director
- Patrick Kilpatrick – actor, Minority Report, Eraser
- Barbara Kingsolver – author; lives outside Abingdon
- V.J. King (born 1997) – NBA player, attended Paul VI Catholic High School in Fairfax, Virginia
- Wayne Kirby – first base coach for Baltimore Orioles
- Chaney Kley (1972–2007) – actor, Asher on The Shield
- John Kuester (born 1955) – assistant coach for Los Angeles Lakers

== L ==
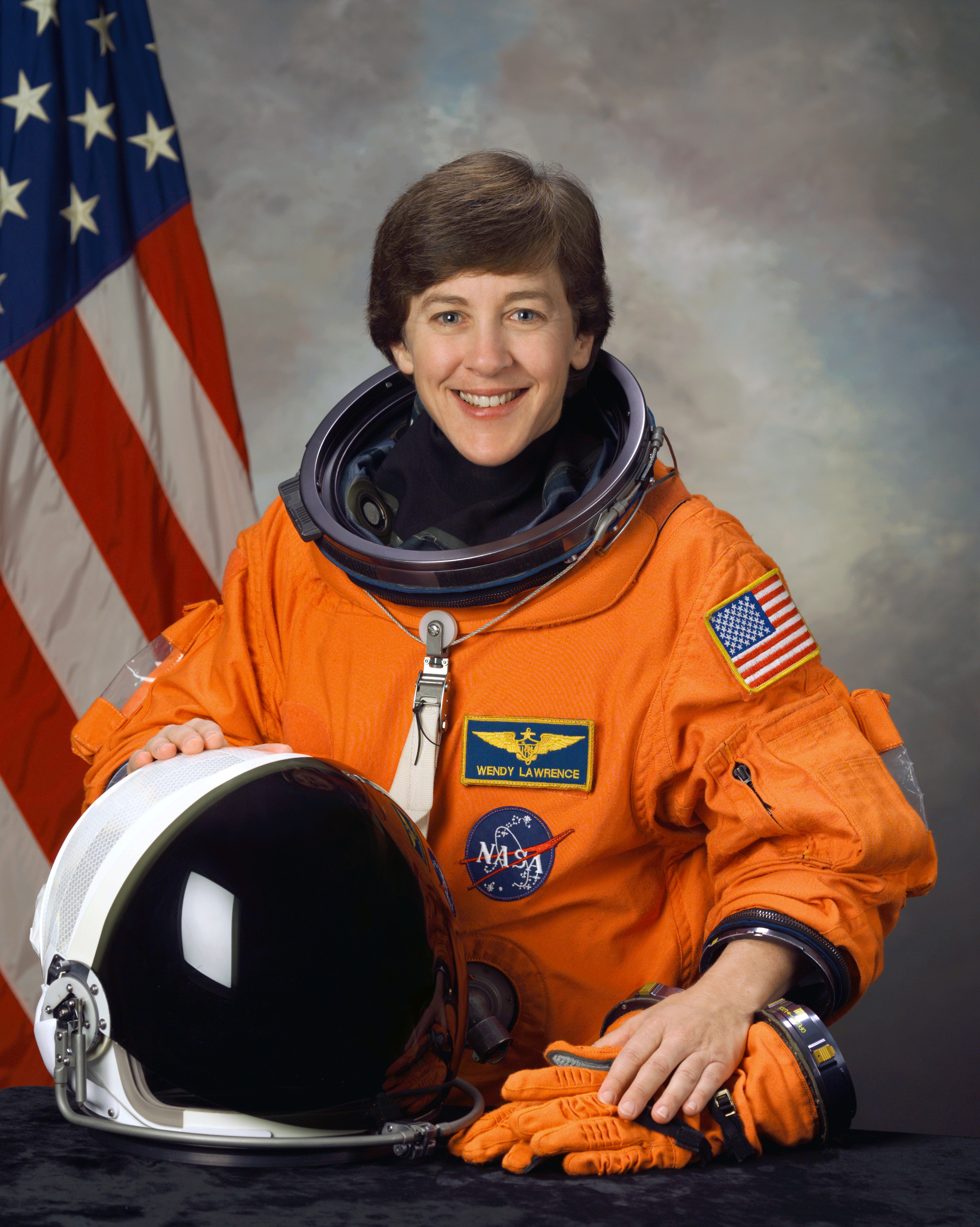
Wendy B. Lawrence

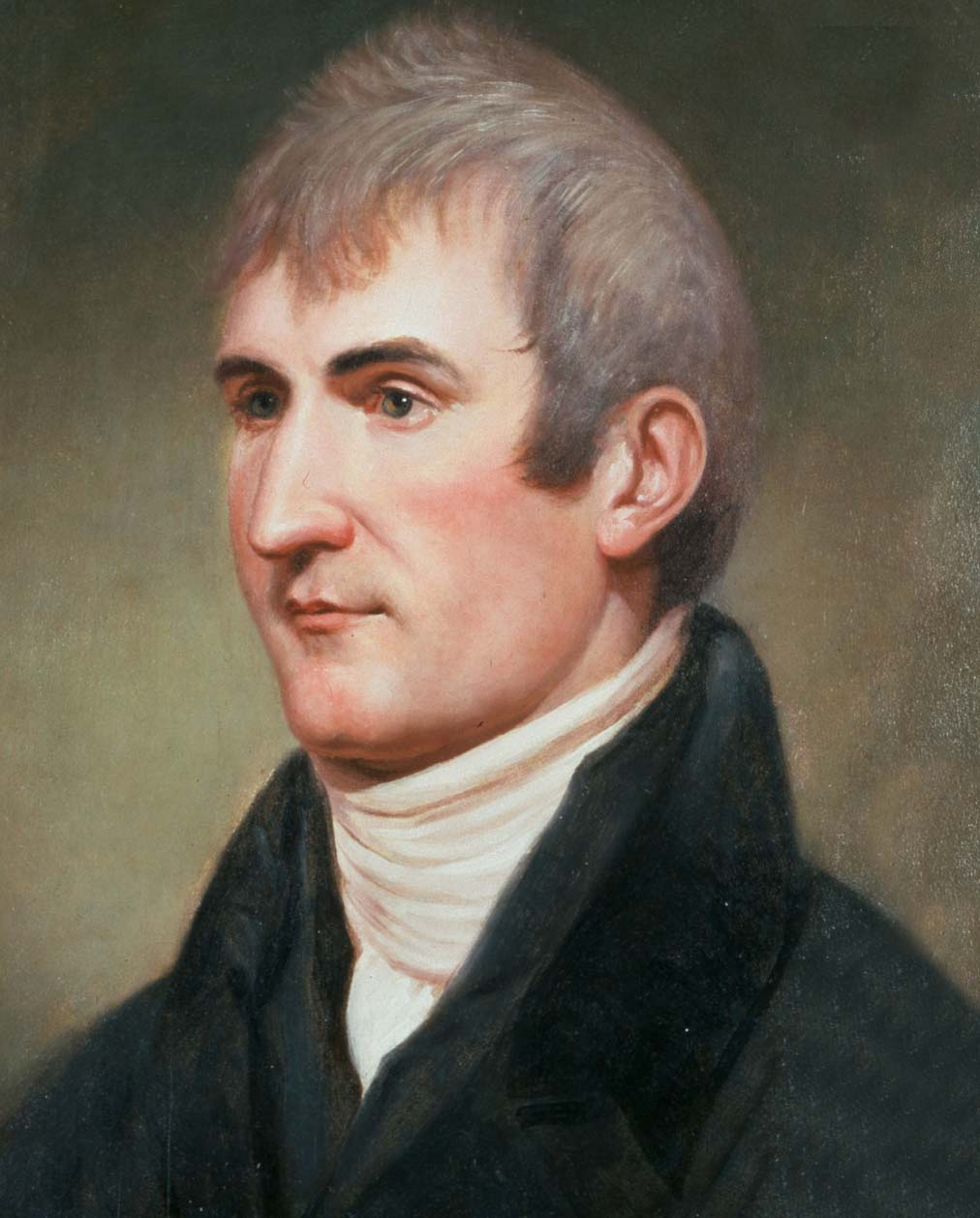
Meriwether Lewis

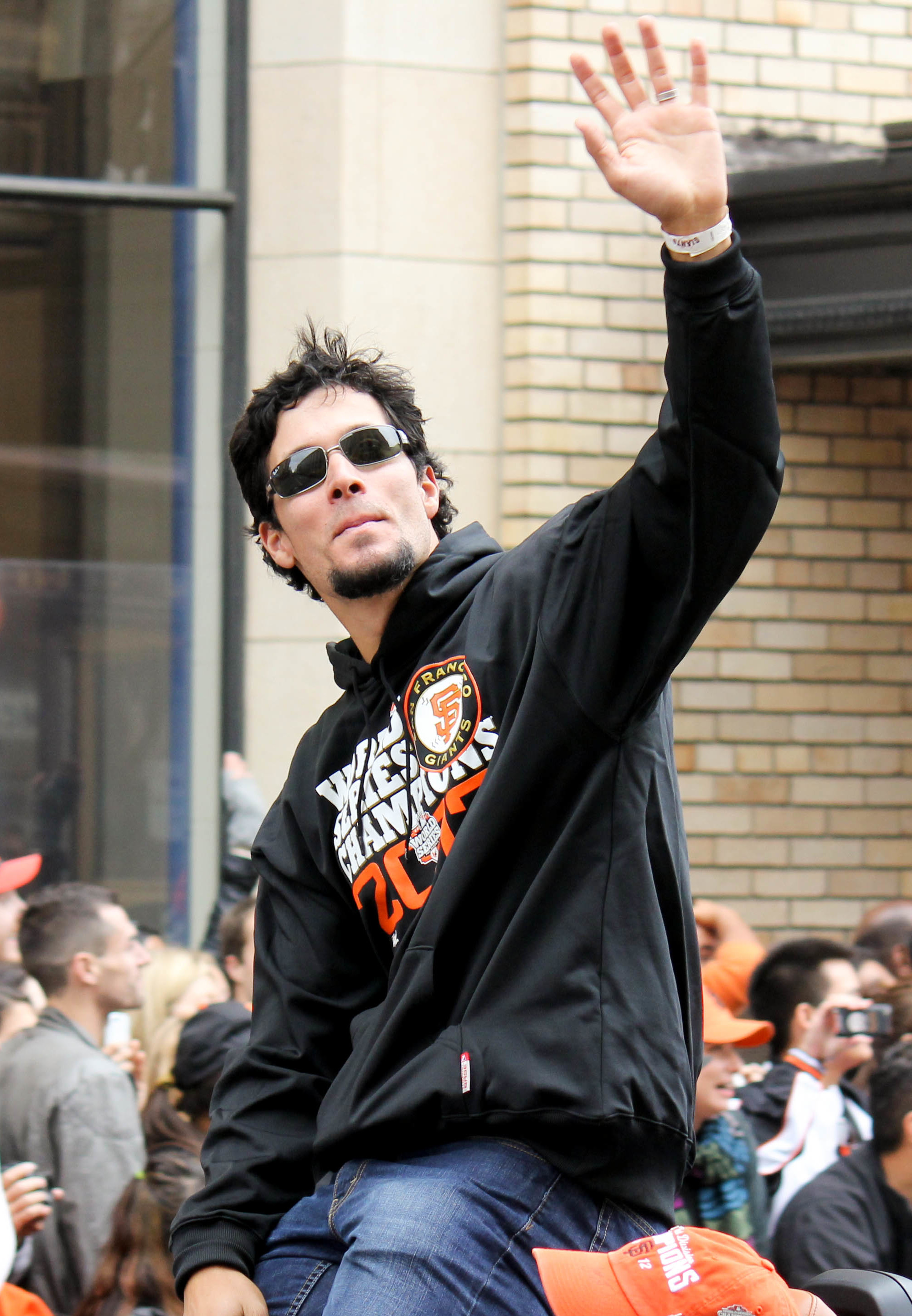
Javier López

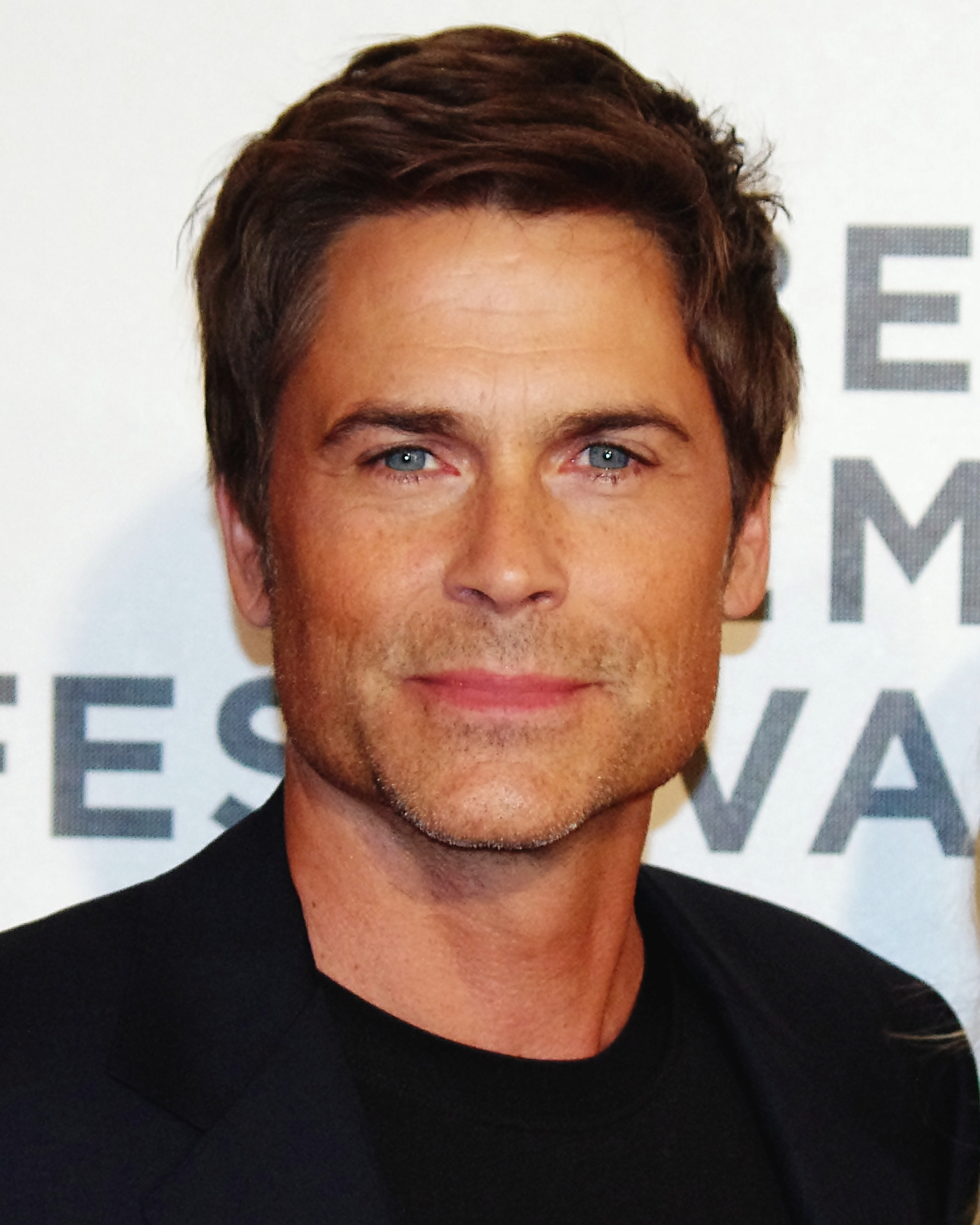
Rob Lowe

- Michael Lachowski – bass guitar player for rock band Pylon
- Jeffrey M. Lacker – chief executive of Fifth District Federal Reserve Bank at Richmond
- Kendall Langford – defensive end for Miami Dolphins
- Rick Langford – MLB pitcher
- Wayne LaPierre – former CEO and executive vice president of National Rifle Association of America, author, gun rights advocate
- Alan Larson (born 1949) – diplomat and ambassador
- Mat Latos – MLB pitcher
- Wendy B. Lawrence § (born 1959) – retired U.S. Navy captain, helicopter pilot, engineer, NASA astronaut
- Wilford Leach (1929–1988) – film and theatre director, screenwriter
- Jake E. Lee (born 1957) – guitarist for Ratt, Rough Cutt, Ozzy Osbourne, Badlands
- Light Horse Harry Lee (1756–1818) – Prince William County; American Revolutionary War hero; father of Robert E. Lee
- Richard Henry Lee (1732–1794) – Westmoreland County; presented proposal for independence to Continental Congress in 1776
- Robert E. Lee (1807–1870) – Confederate States of America military leader, commander of Army of Northern Virginia
- Will Yun Lee – actor
- William Gregory Lee – actor, Dante's Cove
- Tim Legler – ESPN NBA analyst
- Egbert Leigh – evolutionary ecologist
- Mary Sinton Leitch (1876-1954) - writer & poet, founded the Poetry Society of Virginia
- Meriwether Lewis (1774–1809) – explorer with Lewis and Clark Expedition
- Shaquan Lewis – aka "Skillz" from Supafriendz, rapper
- Sabrina Lloyd (born 1970) – actress, Sliders, Sports Night, Numb3rs
- Mike London (born 1960) – head football coach at University of Virginia
- Chris Long § (born 1985) – NFL defensive end for New England Patriots
- Hyman Isaac Long (born 18th century) – Freemason
- Kyle Long – NFL offensive lineman
- Javier López § (born 1977) – relief pitcher for San Francisco Giants
- Brandon Lowe (born 1994) – second baseman for the Tampa Bay Rays
- Rob Lowe (born 1964) – actor known for films and TV series including The West Wing, Wayne's World, Parks and Recreation
- David Lowery – lead singer of Cracker, co-founder Sound of Music Studios
- Rich Lowry (born 1968) – editor of National Review, syndicated columnist, and author
- Henry Lee Lucas (1936–2001) – serial killer
- Elaine Luria (born 1975) – member of the U.S. House of Representatives from Virginia's 2nd district; former United States Navy Commander

== M ==
Ma–Md

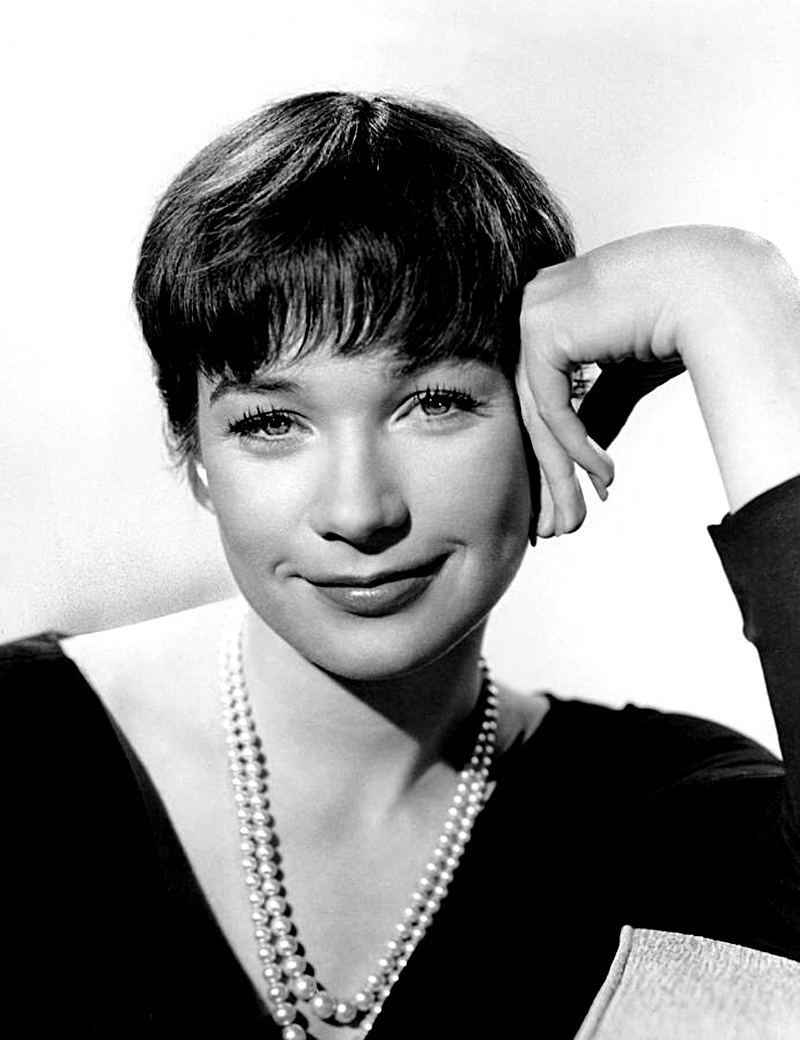
Shirley MacLaine

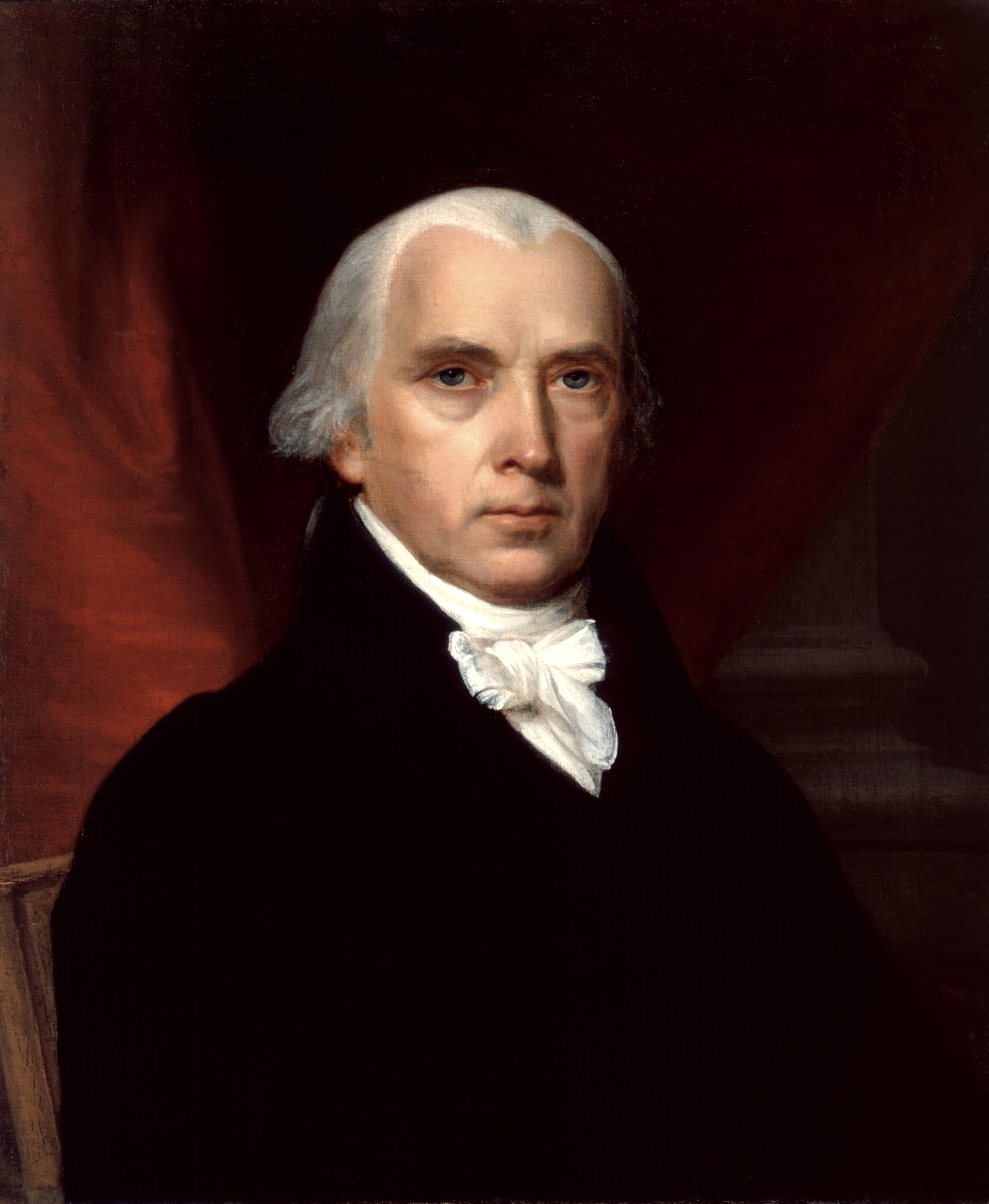
James Madison

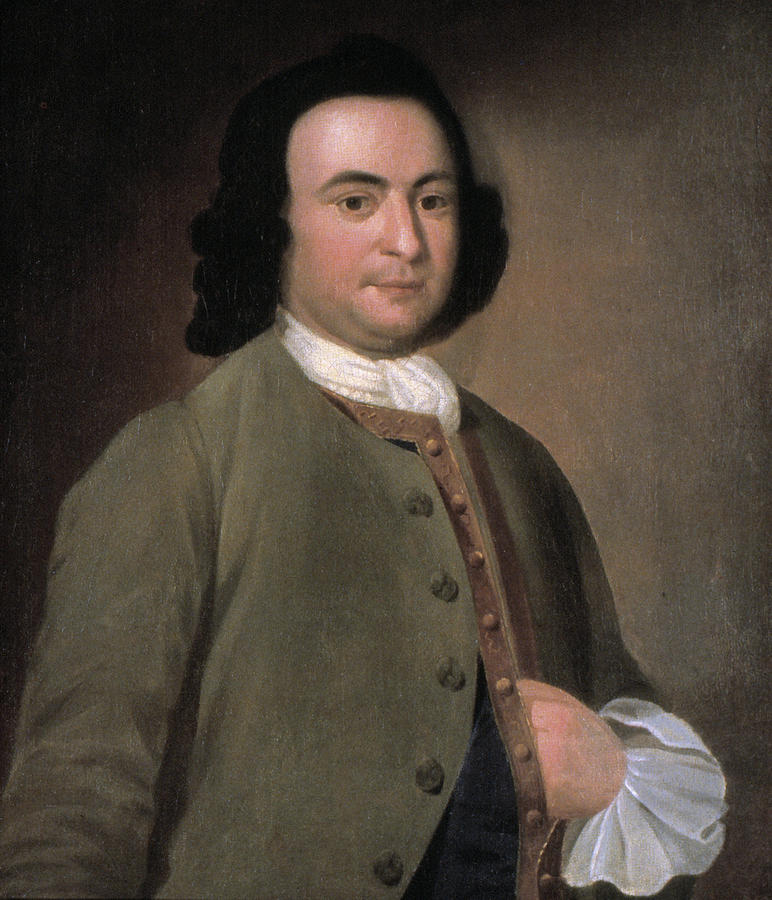
George Mason

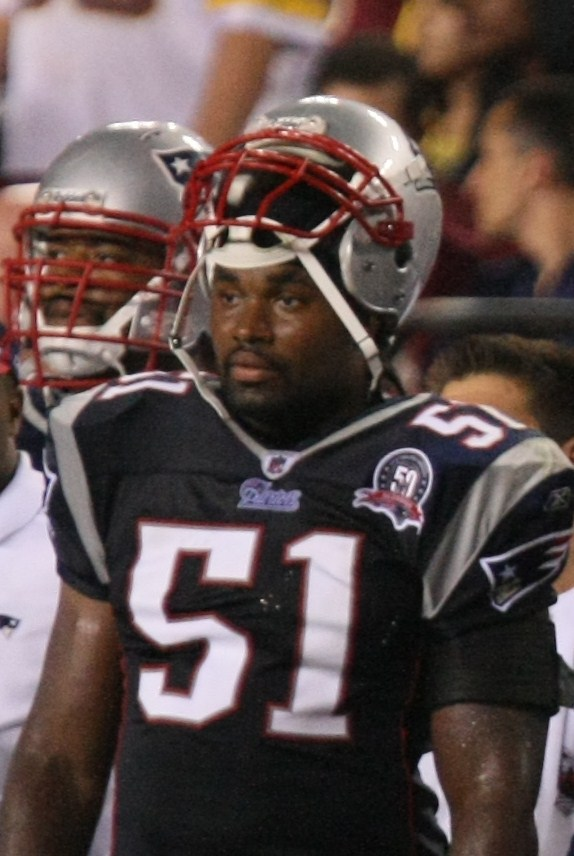
Jerod Mayo

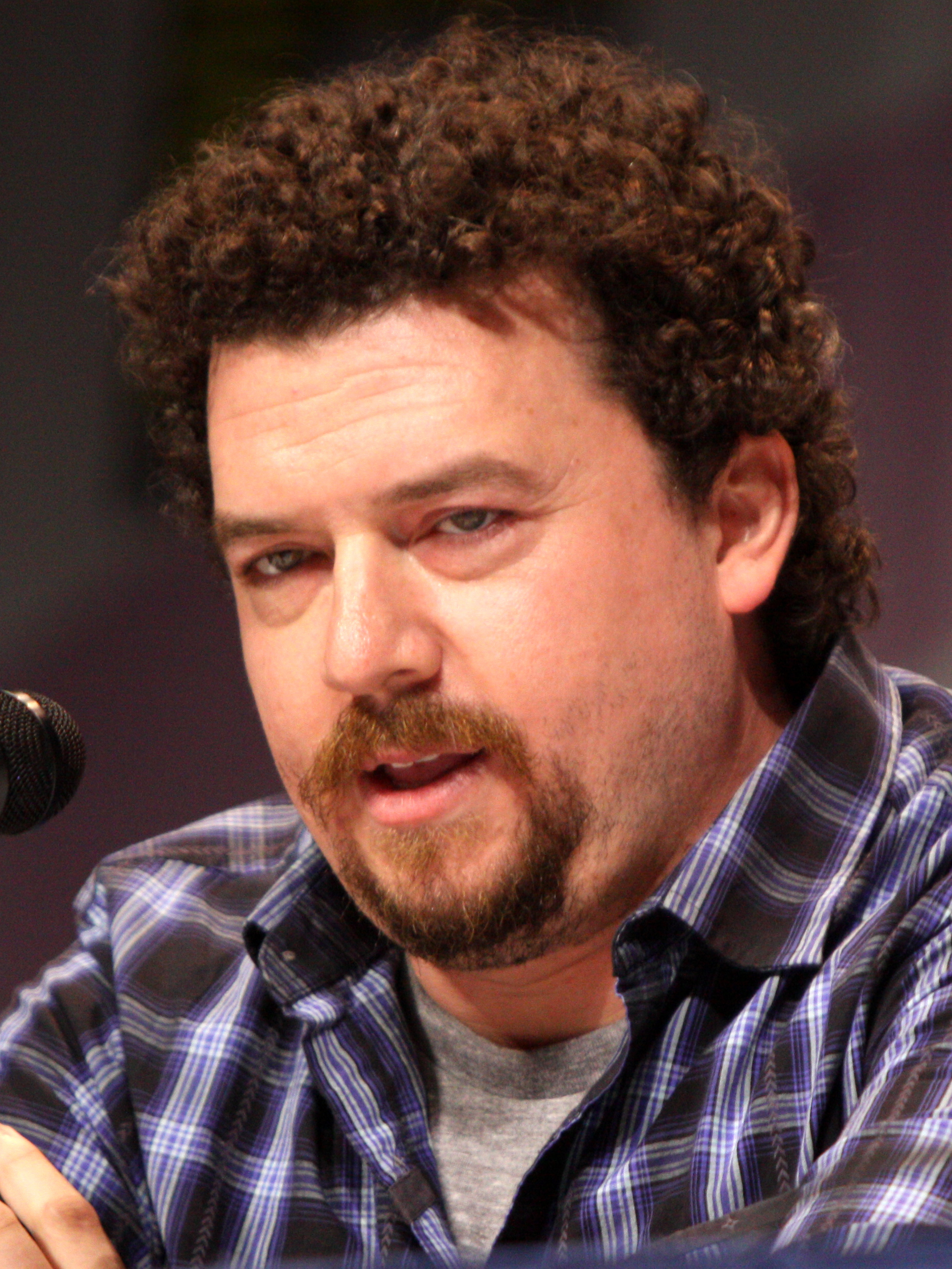
Danny McBride

- Douglas MacArthur § (1880–1964) – military leader, born in Arkansas, considered Norfolk his hometown; buried in Norfolk
- Stanton Macdonald-Wright (1890–1973) – artist
- Vernon Macklin (born 1986) – power forward for Detroit Pistons
- Shirley MacLaine (born 1934) – Academy Award-winning actress and author
- Scott Mactavish (born 1965) – filmmaker and author
- James Madison (1751–1836) – 4th president of the United States, co-author of The Federalist Papers, "father of the United States Constitution"
- Magnum T. A. – professional wrestler
- William Mahone (1826–1895) – Confederate States of America general, founder of Norfolk and Western Railroad (now Norfolk Southern)
- John Maine (born 1981) – MLB pitcher; born in Fredericksburg; graduate of North Stafford High school
- Lee Major – Grammy-nominated music producer
- Ilia Malinin - U.S. Olympic figure skater, first person to land a quadruple axel in competition.
- Moses Malone (1955–2015) – NBA player in Basketball Hall of Fame
- Aimee Mann – musician; from Midlothian and Richmond area
- Sally Mann (born 1951) – photographer; from Lexington
- Charlie Manuel § (born 1944) – former manager of Philadelphia Phillies
- EJ Manuel (born 1990) – quarterback for Oakland Raiders
- Chris Marion § (born 1962) – musician, member of classic rock band Little River Band
- Fannie H. Marr (1835–1918) – author and poet
- Henry L. Marsh (born 1933) – first African-American mayor of Richmond, Virginia
- George Marshall § (1880–1959) – U.S. Army officer, World War II military leader, U.S. Secretary of Defense, author of Marshall Plan and recipient of Nobel Peace Prize; graduate of Virginia Military Institute
- John Marshall – lawyer, statesman, and fourth chief justice of the United States Supreme Court
- Sean Marshall – MLB pitcher
- David Martin § – tight end for Buffalo Bills
- George Mason (1725–1792) – politician, author of Virginia Declaration of Rights; namesake of George Mason University
- Bobby Massie (born 1989) – offensive tackle for Arizona Cardinals
- Debbie Matenopoulos – television personality
- Dave Matthews § (born 1967) – musician, frontman of Dave Matthews Band; resident of Charlottesville
- Matthew Fontaine Maury (1806–1873) – U.S. Navy officer, astronomer, oceanographer, geologist, educator
- Jerod Mayo (born 1986) – linebacker for New England Patriots
- Jayma Mays (born 1979) – actress, Emma Pillsbury on Glee
- John McAfee § (1945–2021) – software engineer for NASA, Computer Sciences Corporation, and Lockheed, known for McAfee antivirus software
- Danny McBride (born 1976) – actor, star of films and TV series Eastbound and Down; from Fredericksburg
- John McCain § (1936–2018) – Panamanian-born politician, navy officer, U.S. senator from Arizona from 1986 until his death; 2008 Republican nominee for president; raised in Alexandria and Arlington
- John McCargo (born 1983) – NFL defensive tackle for Buffalo Bills
- Dagen McDowell – anchor on Fox Business Network and correspondent for Fox News Channel
- Michael McGlothlin (born 1951) – president of [University of Appalachia] School of Pharmacy, politician, and activist
- William Holmes McGuffey § (1800–1873) – creator of McGuffey Readers; professor at University of Virginia
- David McLeod (born 1971) – first recipient of Arena Football League Defensive Player of the Year Award
- Billy McMullen – football player for University of Virginia and Minnesota Vikings
- Jesse McReynolds – bluegrass musician, mandolin player

Me–Mz

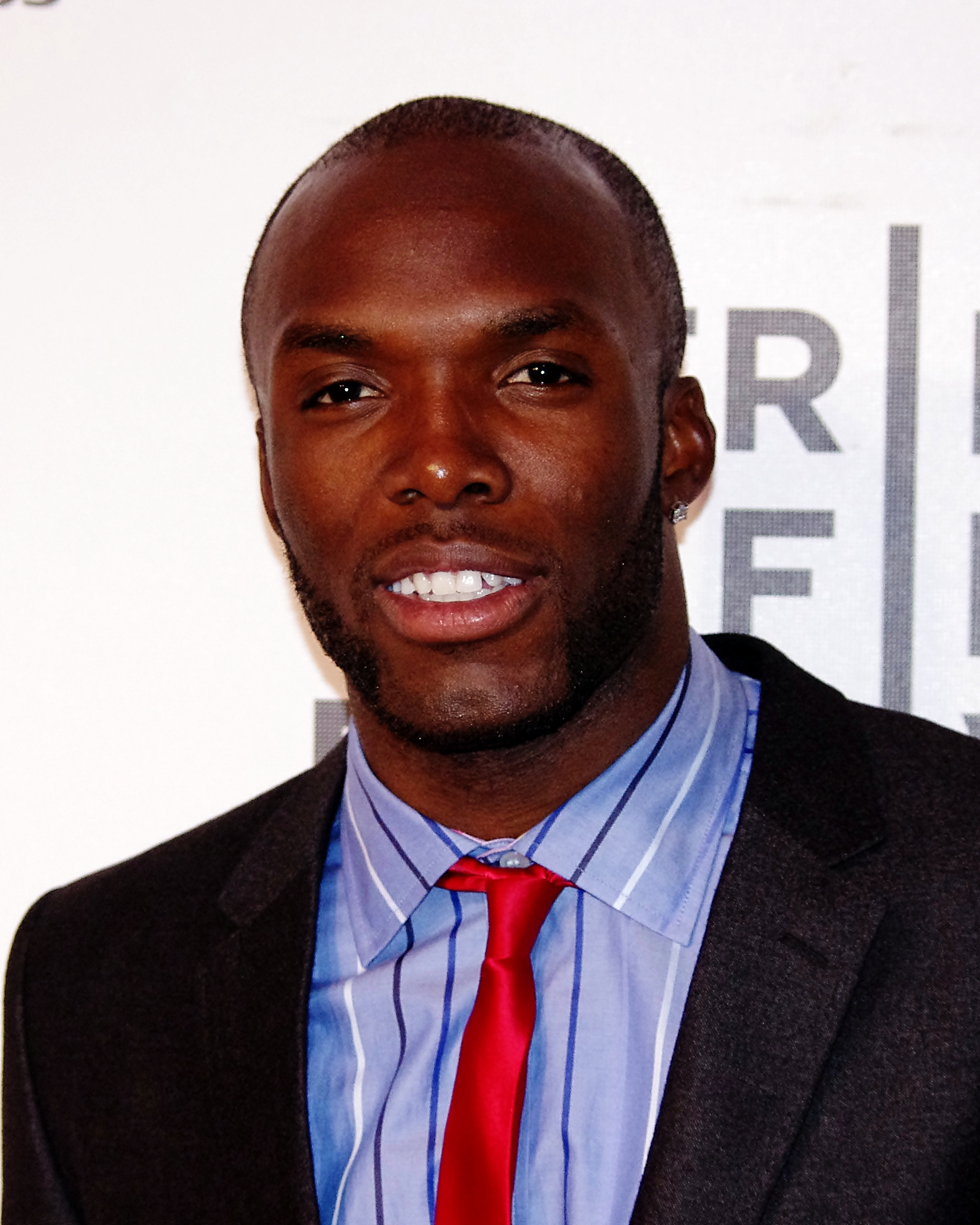
LaShawn Merritt

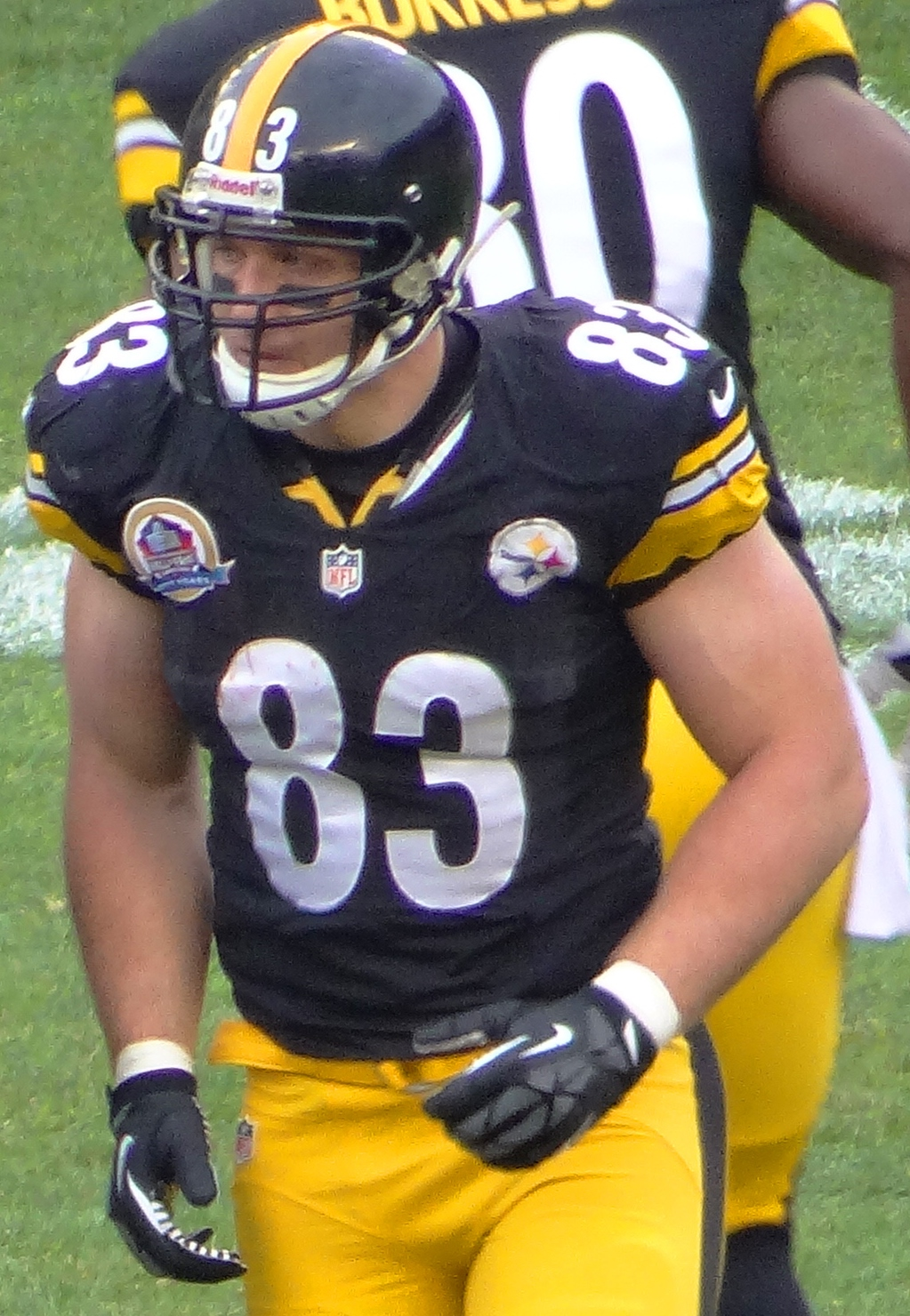
Heath Miller

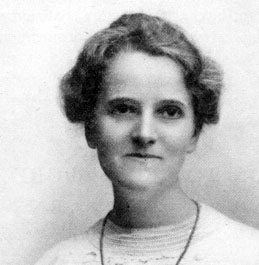
Nannie Jacquelin Minor

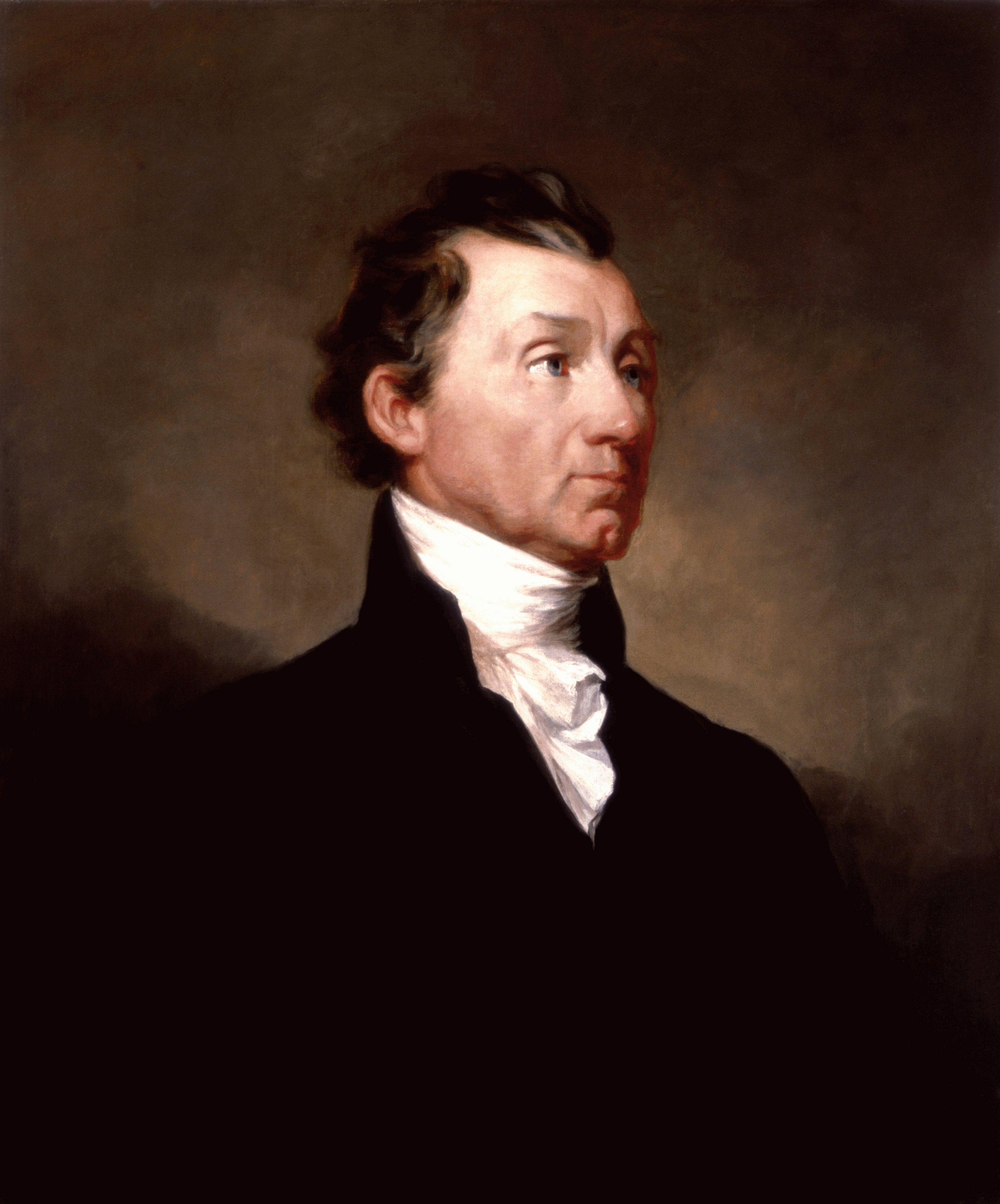
James Monroe

- Joseph Meek (1810–1875) – explorer and fur trader
- Philip B. Meggs – design historian, author of History of Graphic Design
- Christopher Meloni – actor, Law & Order: SVU; grew up in Alexandria and went to St. Stephens School
- Leland D. Melvin (born 1964) – NASA astronaut
- Camila Mendes (born 1994) – actor, Do Revenge; born in Charlottesville
- Joey Mercury (born 1979) – professional wrestler
- LaShawn Merritt – track sprinter, 3-time Olympic gold medalist
- Heath Miller (born 1982) – NFL tight end for Pittsburgh Steelers
- Jason C. Miller § (born 1972) – lead vocalist and guitarist for Godhead
- Mittie Miller (1850–1937) – novelist
- Judson Mills § (born 1969) – actor, Francis Gage on Walker, Texas Ranger
- Nannie Jacquelin Minor (1871–1934) – early practitioner of public health nursing in Virginia
- Arthur Moats (born 1988) – NFL linebacker for Buffalo Bills
- Modern Groove Syndicate – funk band from Richmond, Virginia
- Darryl Monroe (born 1986) – professional basketball player, 2016 Israeli Basketball Premier League MVP
- James Monroe (1758–1831) – 5th president of the United States; namesake of Monroe Doctrine
- John Montague (born 1947) – MLB pitcher
- Will Montgomery § (born 1983) – NFL lineman for Washington Redskins
- Jim Moody (born 1949) – actor
- Lottie Moon (1840–1912) – Christian missionary to China
- Jim Morrison § (1943–1971) – singer-songwriter for The Doors; born in Florida; graduated from high school in Alexandria
- Mark Morton – guitarist for Lamb of God
- John Singleton Mosby (1833–1916) – Edgemont; "The Gray Ghost", Confederate cavalry commander
- William P. Moseley – (1819–1890) businessman and Virginia senator
- Wendell Moore Jr. (born 2001) – basketball player
- Alonzo Mourning (born 1970) – basketball player, Olympic gold medalist, member of Basketball Hall of Fame
- Jason Mraz (born 1977) – musician
- John Mullan (1830–1909) – soldier, explorer, civil servant, and road builder
- Dermot Mulroney (born 1963) – actor of many films including My Best Friend's Wedding
- Mick Mulvaney (born 1967) – Director of the Office of Management and Budget
- Lenda Murray § (born 1962) – IFBB professional bodybuilder
- Bret Myers (born 1980) – soccer player and professor
- Lon Myers (1858–1899) – sprinter, multiple world records

== N ==
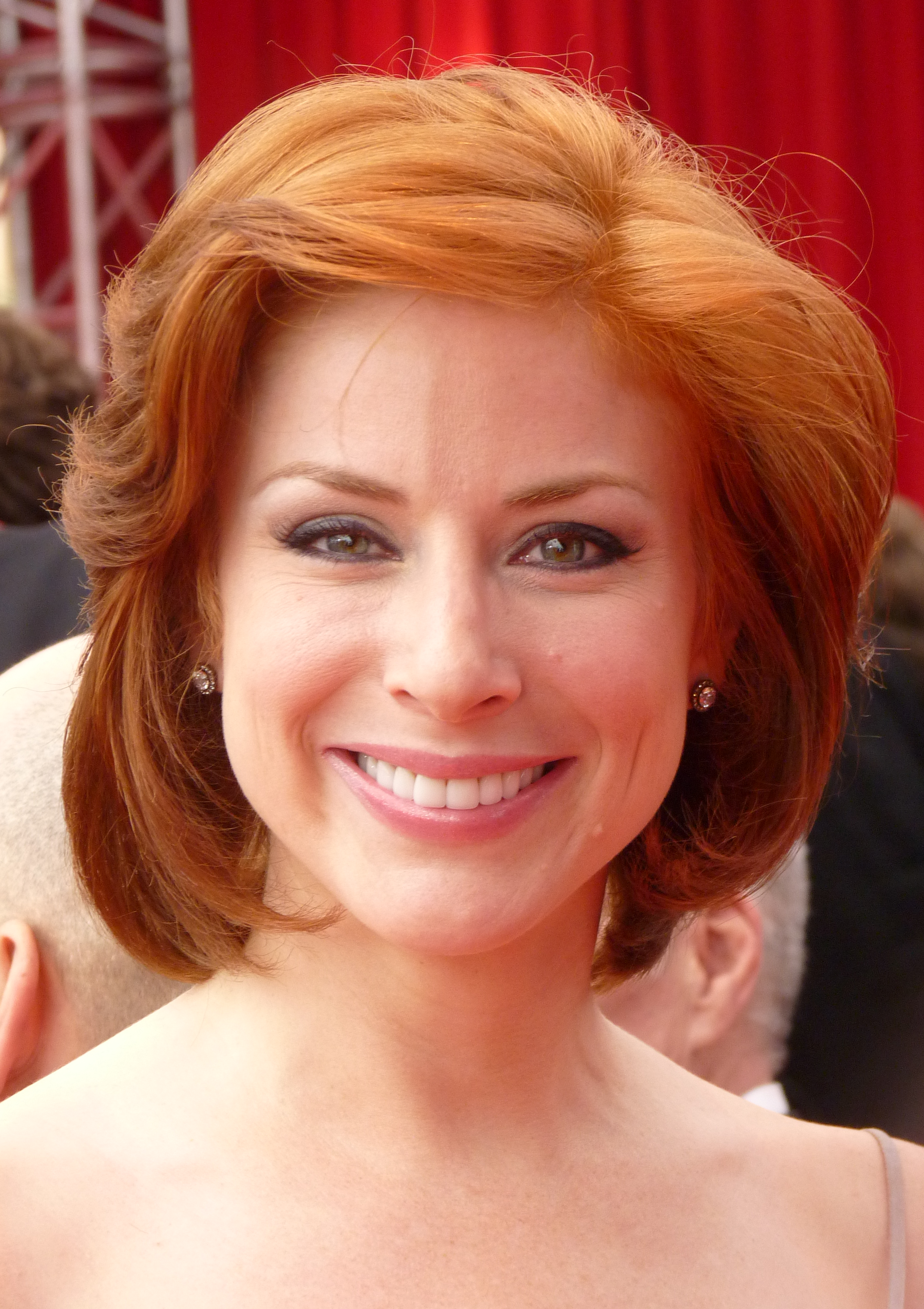
Diane Neal

- Kaedan Nam – member of South Korean boy group Fantasy Boys
- Diane Neal (born 1976) – actress; Casey Novak on Law & Order: Special Victims Unit
- Thomas Nelson Jr. (1738–1789) – governor of Virginia, signer of Declaration of Independence
- Nettspend (born 2007) – rapper
- Ralph Northam (born 1959) – 73rd governor of Virginia
- Johnny Newman (born 1963) – University of Richmond and NBA basketball player
- Tommy Newsom (1929–2007) – saxophone player, bandleader
- Wayne Newton (born 1942) – singer, entertainer, actor
- Nick Novak § (born 1981) – placekicker for San Diego Chargers
- Michael Negrete (born 1981) – man who mysteriously disappeared in 1999

== O ==
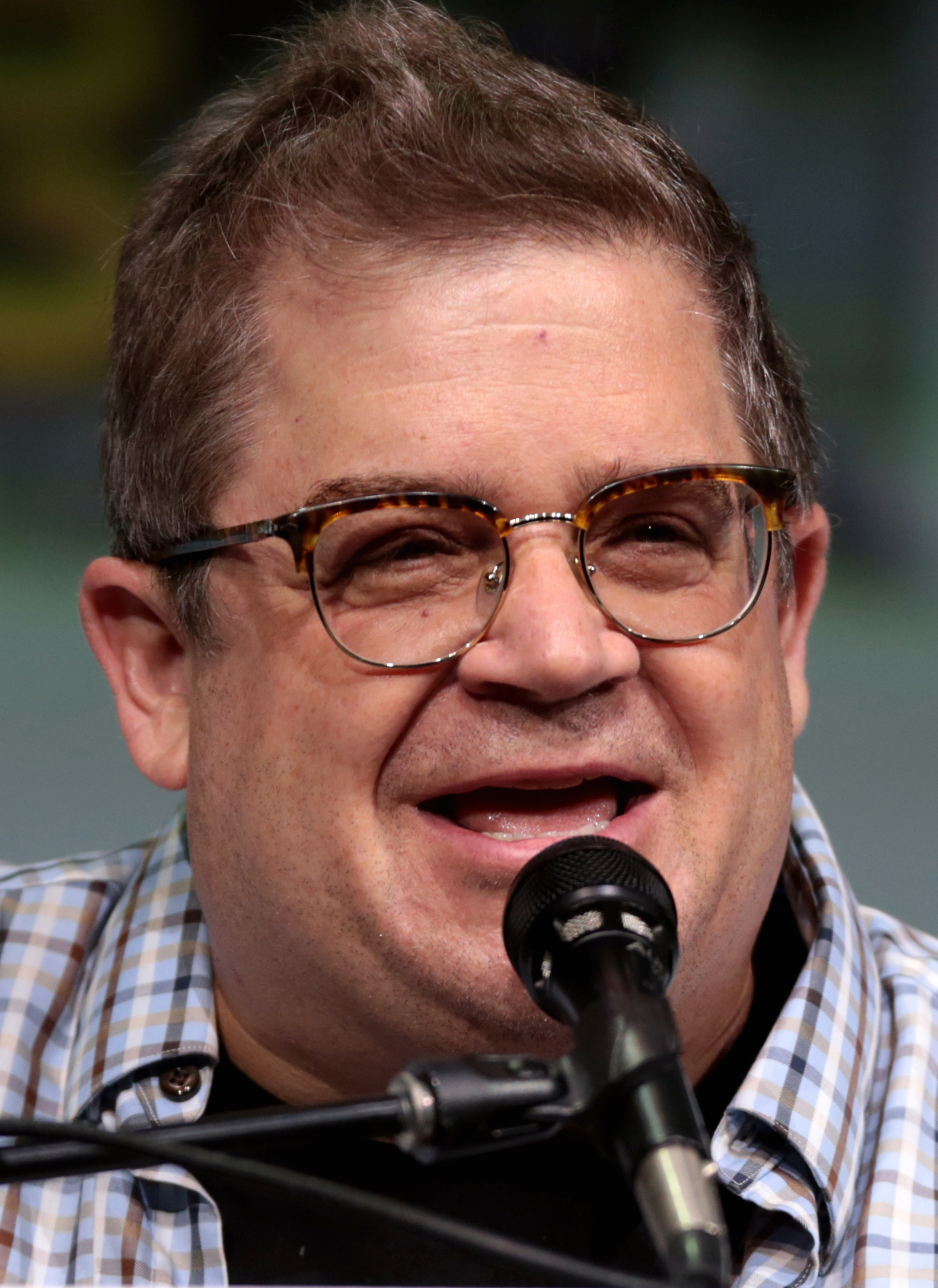
Patton Oswalt

- Afemo Omilami (born 1950) – actor
- Texas Jack Omohundro (1846–1880) – frontier scout, actor, and cowboy
- Uncle Charlie Osborne (1890–1992) – musician
- Patton Oswalt (born 1969) – actor and comedian
- Rayvon Owen (born 1991) – musician, contestant on American Idol season 14
- Ken Oxendine – NFL running back

== P ==
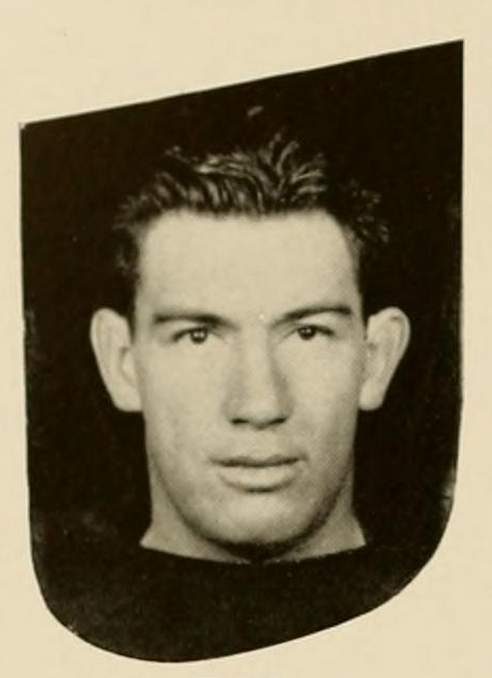
Ace Parker

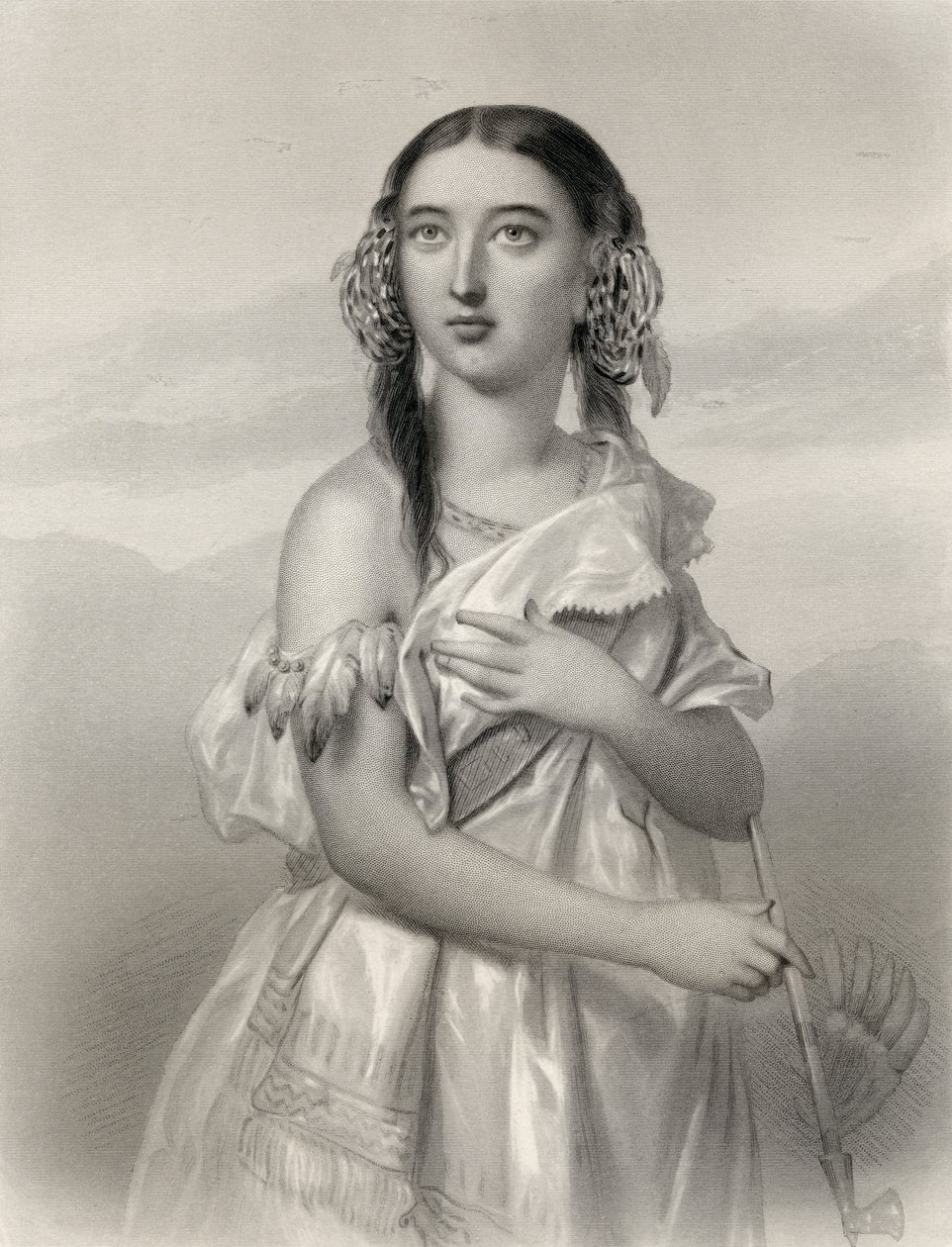
Pocahontas

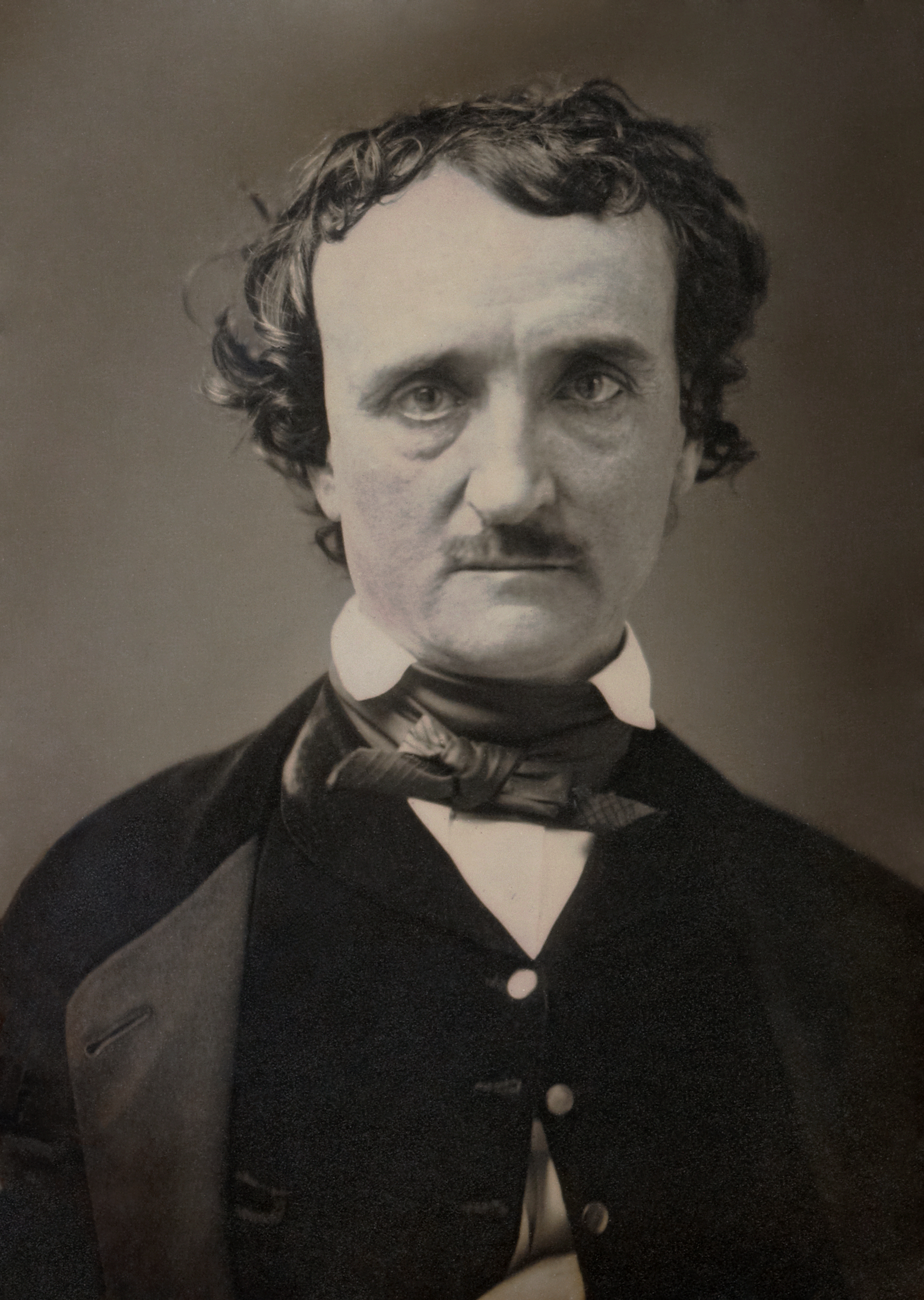
Edgar Allan Poe

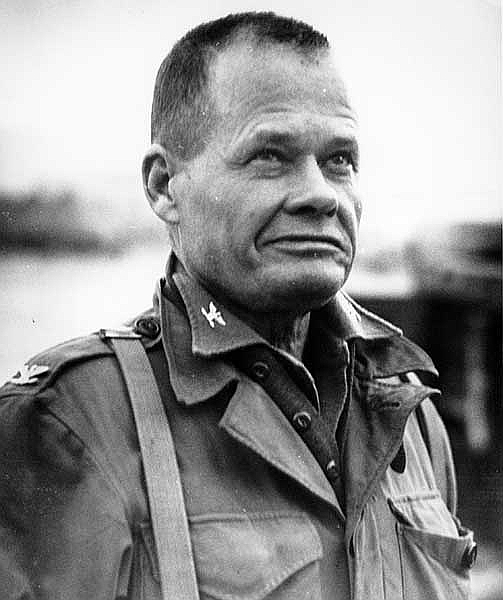
Chesty Puller

- Elizabeth Fry Page (1865–1943) – author and editor
- Micky Park § – singer and actor
- Ace Parker (1912–2013) – Pro Football Hall of Fame quarterback
- George S. Patton § (1885–1945) – World War II military leader; family was from Fredericksburg; attended the Virginia Military Institute
- M. M. Parsons (1822–1865) – Confederate general, second commander of Missouri State Guard in the American Civil War
- Robert Paxton – historian
- James Spriggs Payne – fourth and eighth president of Liberia
- John Payne – actor of many films including Miracle on 34th Street
- Judith Peck – award-winning visual artist and portrait painter
- Cedric Peerman – NFL running back
- Tom Peloso – member of Modest Mouse; formerly of The Hackensaw Boys
- Tony Perez (born 1942) – actor, Hill Street Blues
- Thomas J. Perrelli (born 1966) – U.S. Associate Attorney General under President Barack Obama
- Darren Perry (born 1968) – assistant coach for Green Bay Packers
- Jay Pharoah (born 1987) – comedian, impressionist, Saturday Night Live
- John Phillips § (1935–2001) – folk and pop musician of 1960s vocal group The Mamas & the Papas
- John Phillips (born 1987) – tight end for Dallas Cowboys
- Pocahontas (1595–1617) – princess of Powhatan tribe
- Edgar Allan Poe § – iconic author of "The Raven", "The Tell-Tale Heart" and other poems and stories
- Lewis F. Powell – associate justice of the Supreme Court of the United States 1971-87
- Darrell C. Powers – member of Easy Company, Band of Brothers (1923–2009)
- Chief Powhatan (1547–1618) – ruler of Eastern Virginia at time of founding of Jamestown
- Paul Pressey (born 1958) – NBA small forward, assistant coach for Cleveland Cavaliers
- Sterling Price (1809–1867) – 11th governor of Missouri, first commander of Missouri State Guard in the American Civil War
- Faith Prince § (born 1957) – actress, Huff and Spin City
- Margaret Prior (1773–1842) – missionary, reformist, and writer
- Chesty Puller (1898–1971) – most decorated Marine in American history

== Q ==
- George Quaintance (1902–1957) – artist
- Christopher Dillon Quinn – documentarian

== R ==
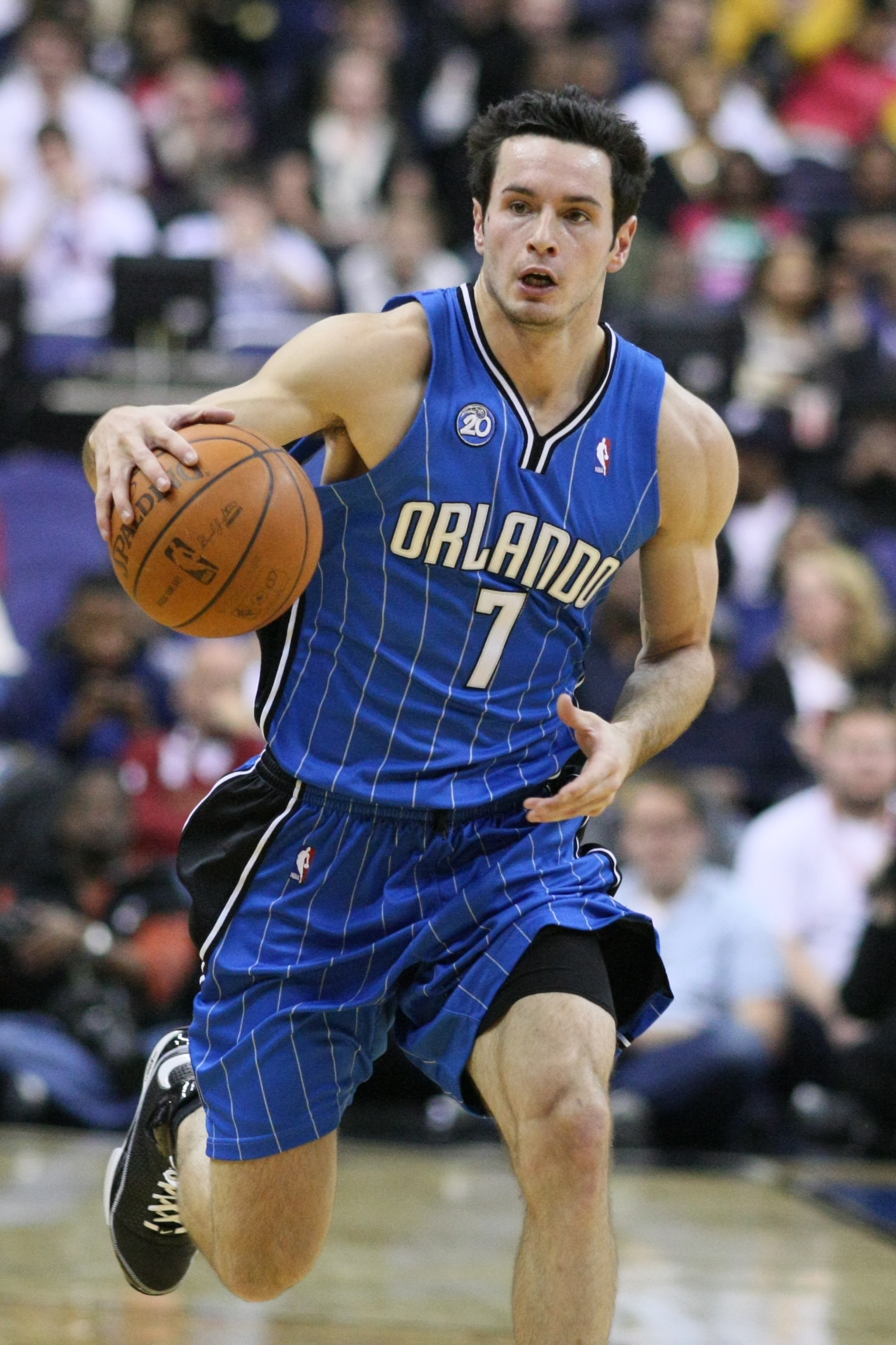
JJ Redick

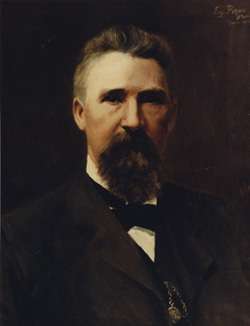
R. J. Reynolds

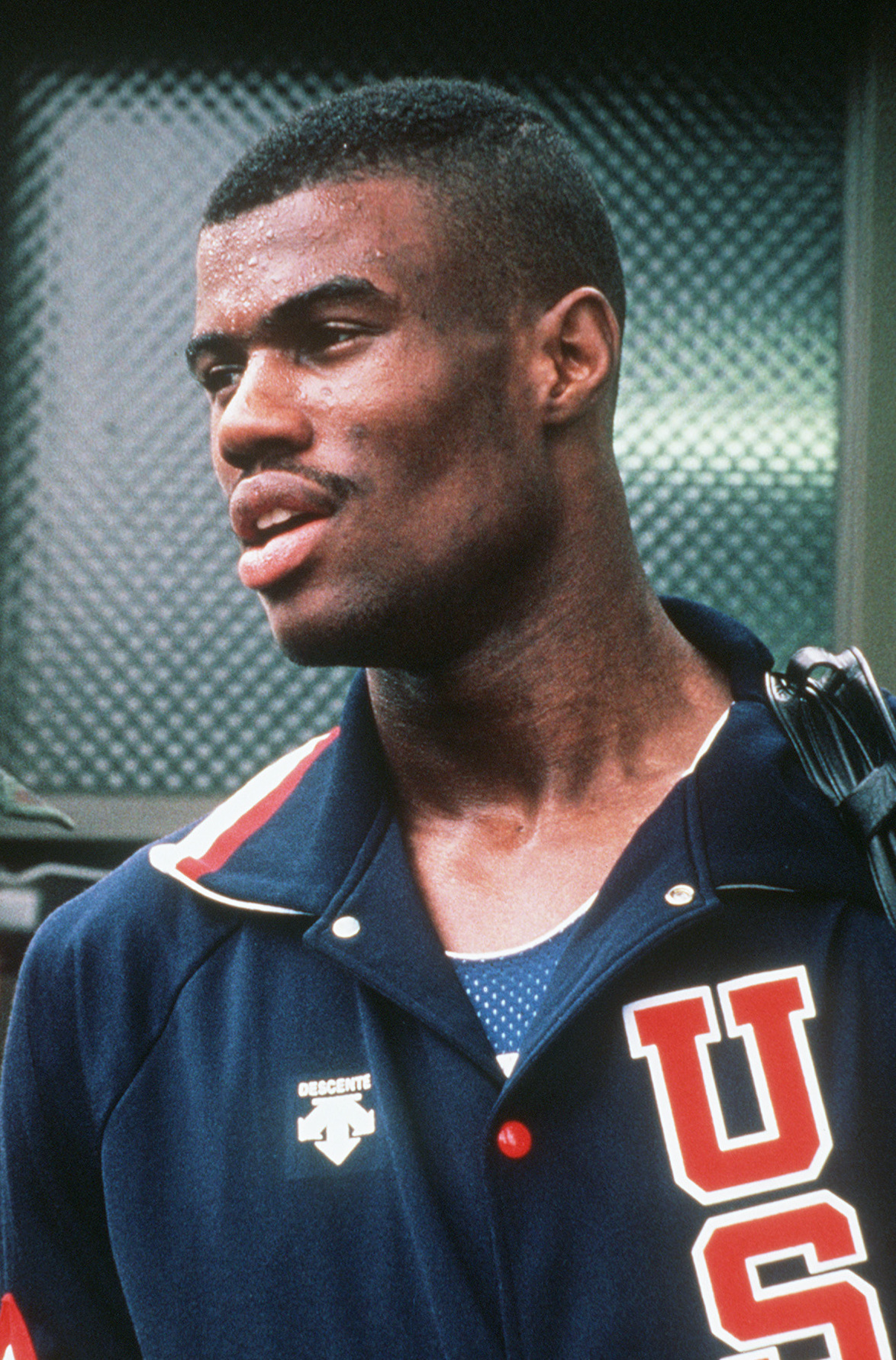
David Robinson

- Edmund Randolph (1753–1813) – governor of Virginia, U.S. attorney general, Secretary of State
- Peyton Randolph – 1775 president of Continental Congress
- Della H. Raney (1912–1987) – first African American accepted into the United States Army Nurse Corps
- Clay Rapada (born 1981) – retired MLB pitcher
- Chris Ray (born 1982) – retired MLB pitcher
- J. J. Redick § (born 1984) – shooting guard for New Orleans Pelicans
- Ralph Reed (born 1961) – conservative political activist, novelist
- Tim Reid (born 1944) – actor, comedian, director, WKRP in Cincinnati, Simon & Simon, Sister, Sister
- J. Sargeant Reynolds – businessman, statesman, lieutenant governor
- LaRoy Reynolds – linebacker for Atlanta Falcons
- Mark Reynolds § (born 1983) – MLB infielder for Colorado Rockies
- R. J. Reynolds (1850–1918) – businessman and founder of R. J. Reynolds Tobacco Company
- Vera Reynolds (1899–1962) – 1920s and '30s film actress
- Chris Richardson § (born 1984) – American Idol finalist
- Alex Riley – WWE professional wrestler
- John Ripley (1939–2008) – decorated United States Marine Corps colonel
- David L. Robbins – novelist
- Tom Robbins – author, studied art at Richmond Professional Institute (now Virginia Commonwealth University), worked for Richmond Times Dispatch
- Jane Roberts (c. 1819–1914) – 1st First Lady of Liberia
- Joseph Jenkins Roberts (1809–1876) – 1st president of Liberia
- Pat Robertson (born 1930) – Christian televangelist and political leader
- Bill "Bojangles" Robinson § (1878–1949) – dancer
- David Robinson § (born 1965) – Hall of Fame basketball player, Olympic gold medalist, 10-time NBA All-Star
- Michael Robinson (born 1983) – running back for Seattle Seahawks
- John Rolfe § (c. 1585–1622) – settler at Jamestown Settlement, first developer of cultivated tobacco for European market
- John Rollins (born 1975) – professional golfer
- Felipe Rose § – founding member of the Village People
- Tim Rose § – rock, folk, and blues singer-songwriter
- Bobby Ross § – college and pro football coach
- Aaron Rouse (born 1984) – safety for the United Football League and Virginia state senator
- Eddie Royal (born 1986) – wide receiver for San Diego Chargers
- Albert Rust (1818–1870) – politician and Confederate general

== S ==
Sa–Sm

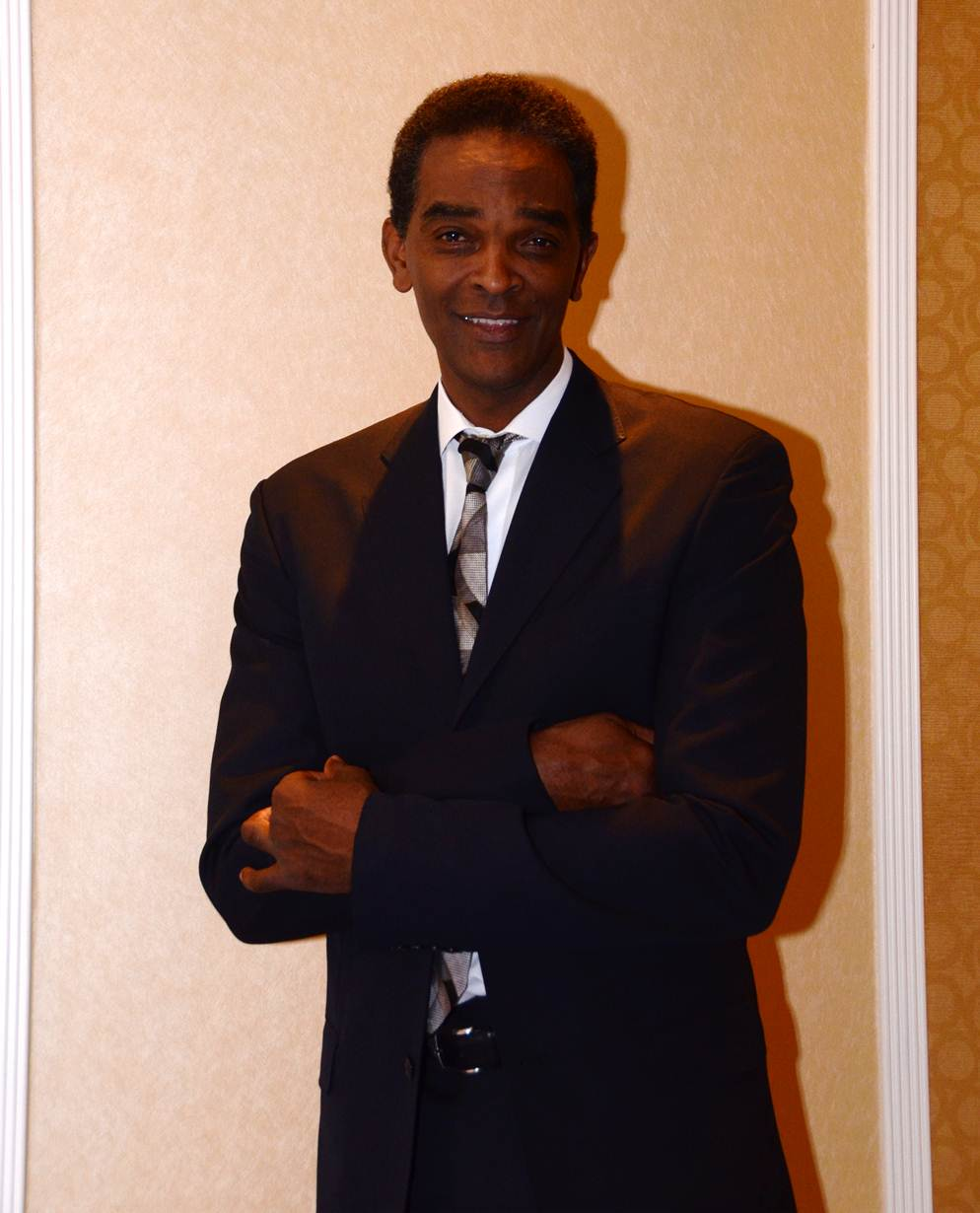
Ralph Sampson

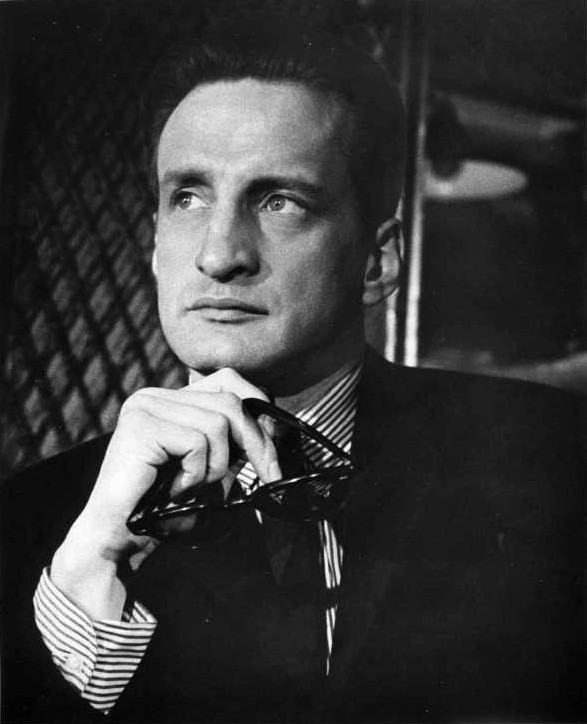
George C. Scott

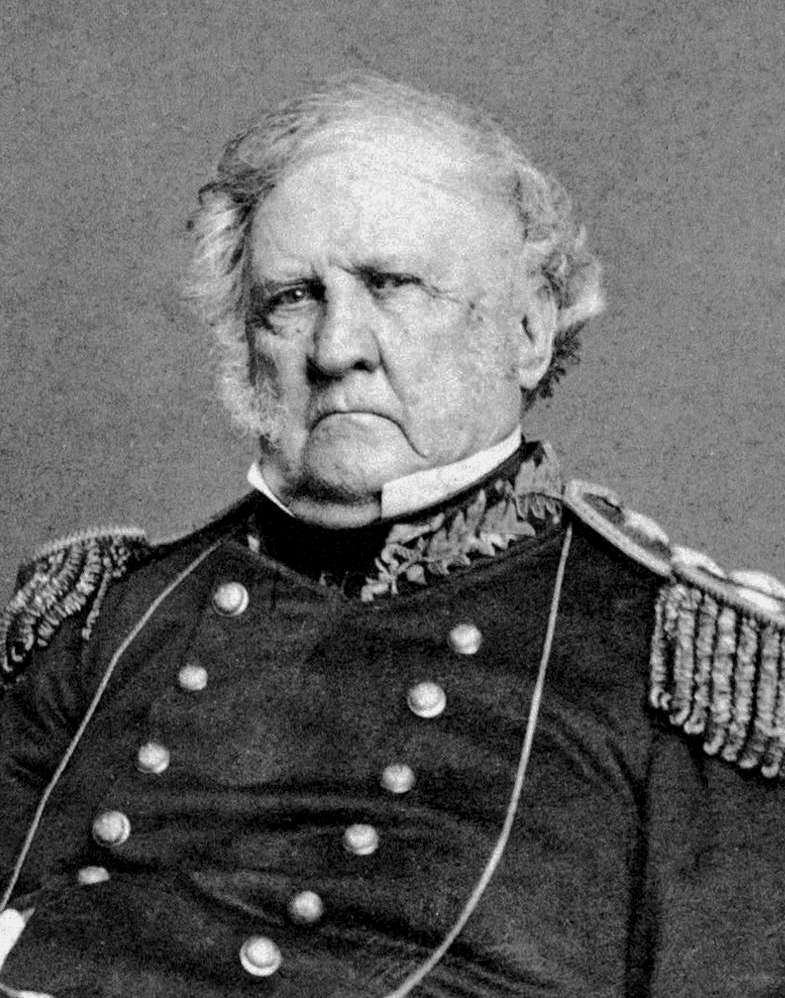
Winfield Scott

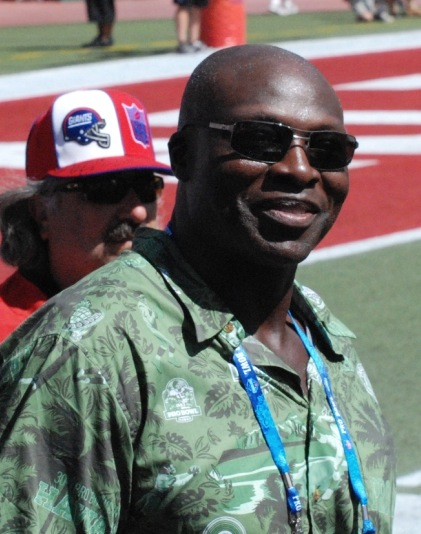
Bruce Smith

- Elliott Sadler (born 1975) – NASCAR driver
- Bob Saget § (born 1956) – actor, comedian, television series Full House, original host of America's Funniest Home Videos
- Billy Sample (born 1955) – MLB player for Texas Rangers, New York Yankees, and Atlanta Braves
- Ralph Sampson (born 1960) – Hall of Fame center, Virginia Cavaliers and NBA
- Rick Santorum (born 1958) – lawyer and former U.S. senator from Pennsylvania
- Joe Saunders (born 1981) – MLB pitcher
- Eric Schmidt (born 1955) – software-engineer and executive chairman of Google
- Owen Schmitt § (born 1985) – fullback for Philadelphia Eagles
- Ed Schultz (1954–2018) – left-wing radio and television host, The Ed Show
- Michael Schwimer (born 1986) – relief pitcher for Philadelphia Phillies
- George C. Scott (1927–1999) – actor; won an Academy Award for Best Actor for film Patton (1970)
- Wendell Scott (1921–1990) – first African American to race in NASCAR
- Willard Scott (1934–2021) – weather reporter on The Today Show; the original Ronald McDonald
- Winfield Scott (1786–1866) – United States Army general
- Steve Scully (born 1960) – host of C-SPAN's Washington Journal
- Rhea Seehorn (born 1972) – Kim Wexler on Better Call Saul
- Seka (born 1954) – adult film star
- Tom Shadyac (born 1958) – film director, Liar Liar, Bruce Almighty, The Nutty Professor
- Darren Sharper – retired NFL safety
- Meghann Shaughnessy – professional tennis player
- Deborah Shelton § (born 1948) – actress, Miss USA 1970
- Ricky Van Shelton – country music and gospel singer; born in Danville, Virginia
- Lauren Shehadi (born 1983) – sportscaster and Journalist
- John Wesley Shipp – actor (Dawson's Creek, The Flash, Guiding Light)
- Gray Simons – Olympic freestyle wrestler, won four NAIA national championships and three NCAA wrestling championships
- Clint Sintim – linebacker for New York Giants
- Scott Sizemore – infielder for New York Yankees
- Sam Sloan (born 1944) – political prisoner, kidnapping victim
- Bruce Smith (born 1963) – former NFL star, career sack leader
- Joe Smith (born 1975) – NBA player for Los Angeles Lakers
- John Smith of Jamestown § (1580–1631) – co-founder of Jamestown Settlement, first English colony in America (1607)
- Kate Smith (1909–1986) – singer best known for rendition of "God Bless America"
- Torrey Smith – wide receiver for San Francisco 49ers

Sn–Sz

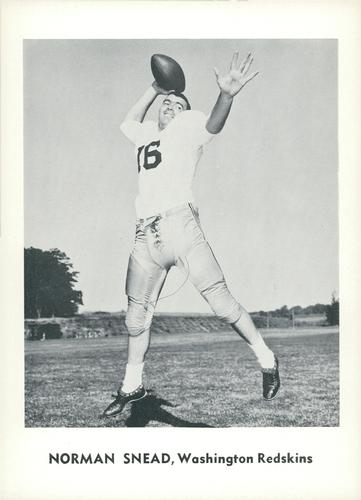
Norm Snead

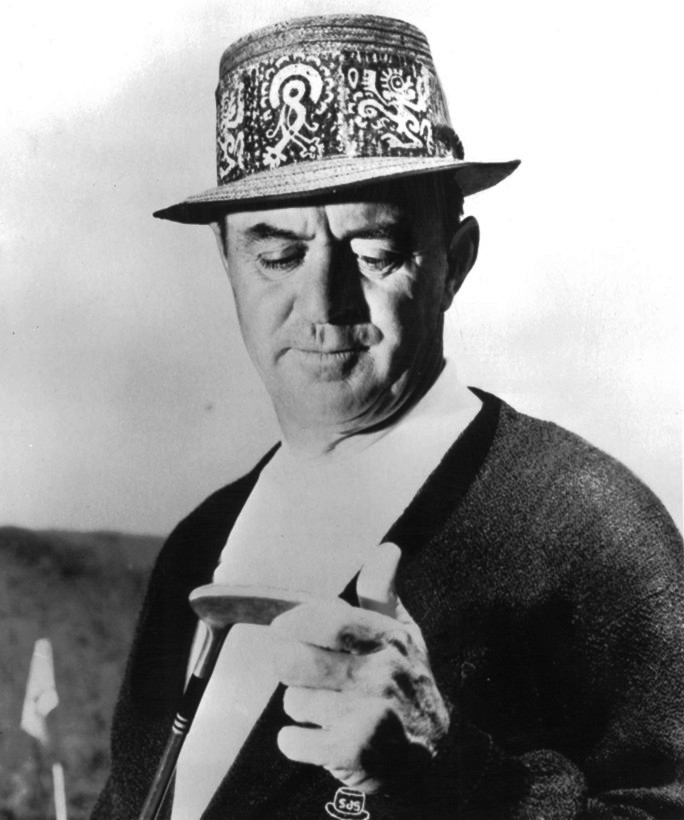
Sam Snead

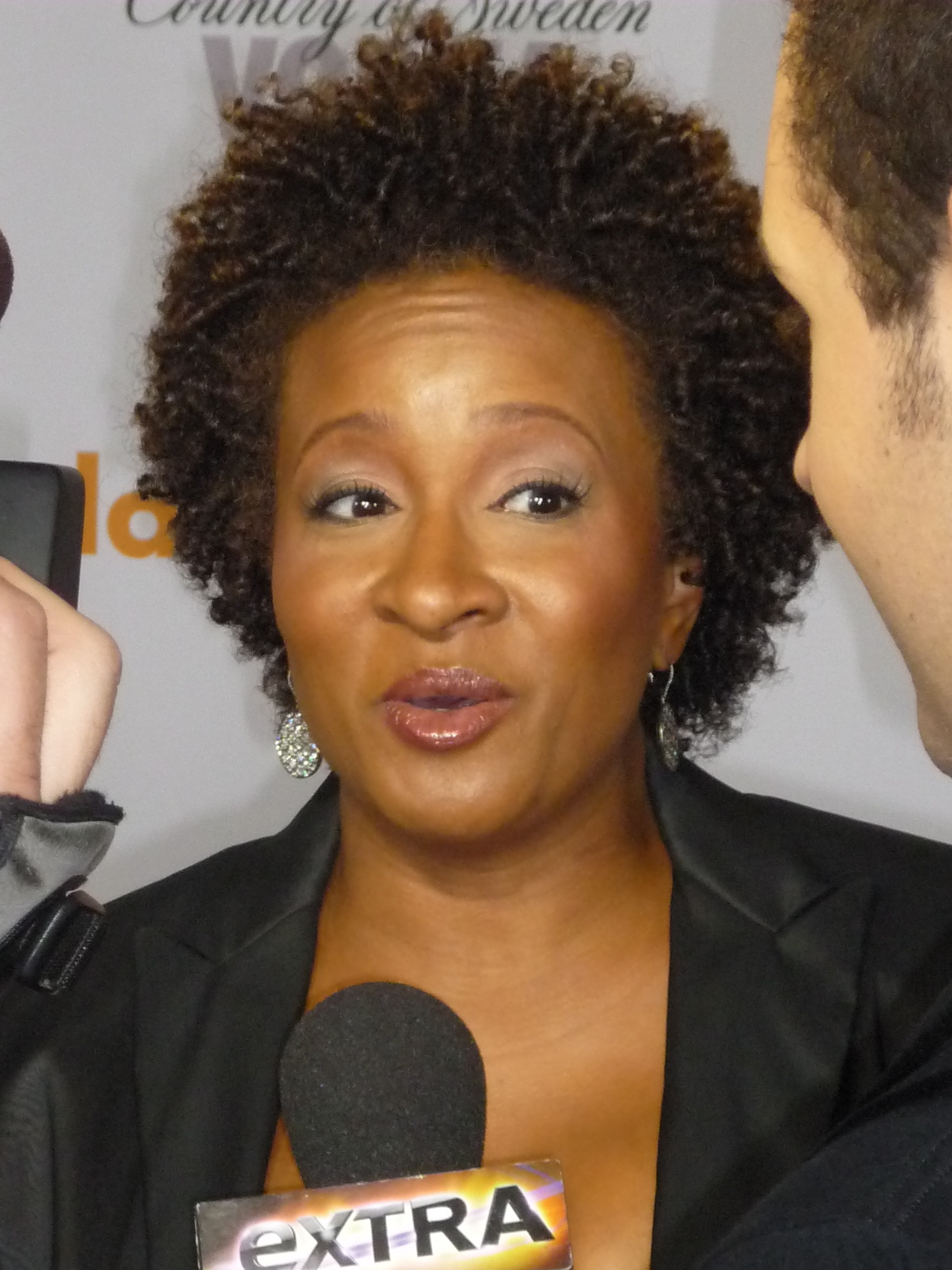
Wanda Sykes

- Norm Snead (born 1939) – NFL quarterback for five teams
- Sam Snead (1912–2002) – Hall of Fame golfer, winner of 82 PGA Tour events including three Masters championships
- Jason Snelling § (born 1983) – running back for Atlanta Falcons
- Abigail Spanberger (born 1979) – U.S. representative of Virginia's 7th Congressional district
- Chris Sprouse (born 1966) – comics artist
- John W. Snow – United States Secretary of the Treasury, chairman and CEO of CSX Corporation
- Maura Soden (born 1955) – actress
- Trey Songz (born 1984) – singer
- Scott Sowers (1963–2018) – actor
- Eric Stanley (born 1991) – violinist, arranger, YouTube personality
- Ralph Stanley (1927–2016) – musician
- Robert Stanton (born 1963) – actor, The Cosby Mysteries
- Peter Starke (1813–1888) – politician and Confederate general
- Robert Stethem § (1961–1985) – U.S. Navy Seabee diver killed by Hezbollah militants during hijacking of TWA Flight 847
- Brandon Stokley (born 1976) – wide receiver for Seattle Seahawks
- Charles Stanley (born 1932) – Southern Baptist pastor
- Dick Stockton § (born 1951) – professional tennis player
- Julyan Stone (born 1988) – player for Denver Nuggets
- Curtis Strange (born 1955) – professional golfer, member of the World Golf Hall of Fame
- Greg Stroman (born 1996) – NFL cornerback
- J.E.B. Stuart (1833–1864) – Confederate general
- William Styron (1925–2006) – novelist
- Skipp Sudduth § (born 1956) – actor, John 'Sully' Sullivan on Third Watch
- Margaret Sullavan (1909–1960) – actress
- Charlie Sumner (1930–2015) – former NFL player and coach
- Carol M. Swain (born 1954) – political scientist, Vanderbilt professor
- Josh Sweat (born 1997) – NFL defensive end
- DeVante Swing (born 1969) – music producer, singer, founder of R&B group Jodeci
- Wanda Sykes – comedian and actress; born in Portsmouth, Virginia

== T ==
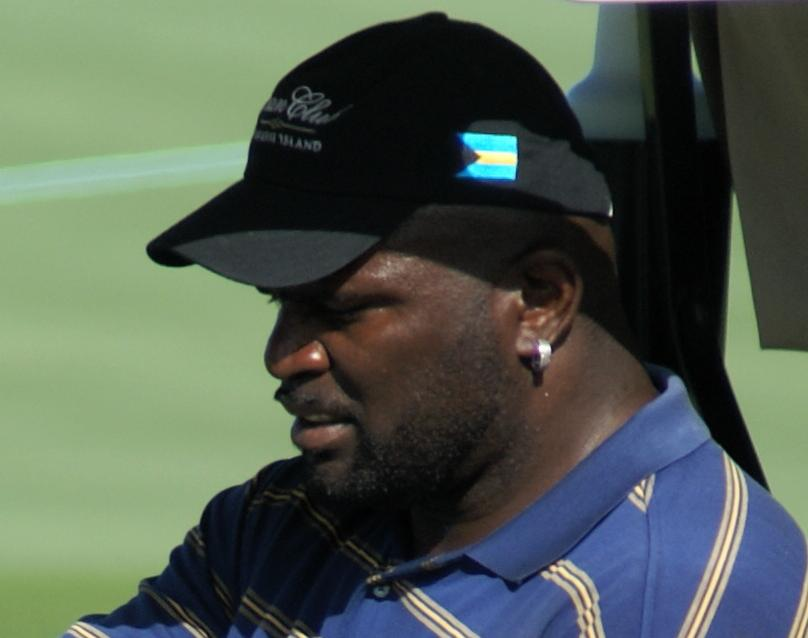
Lawrence Taylor

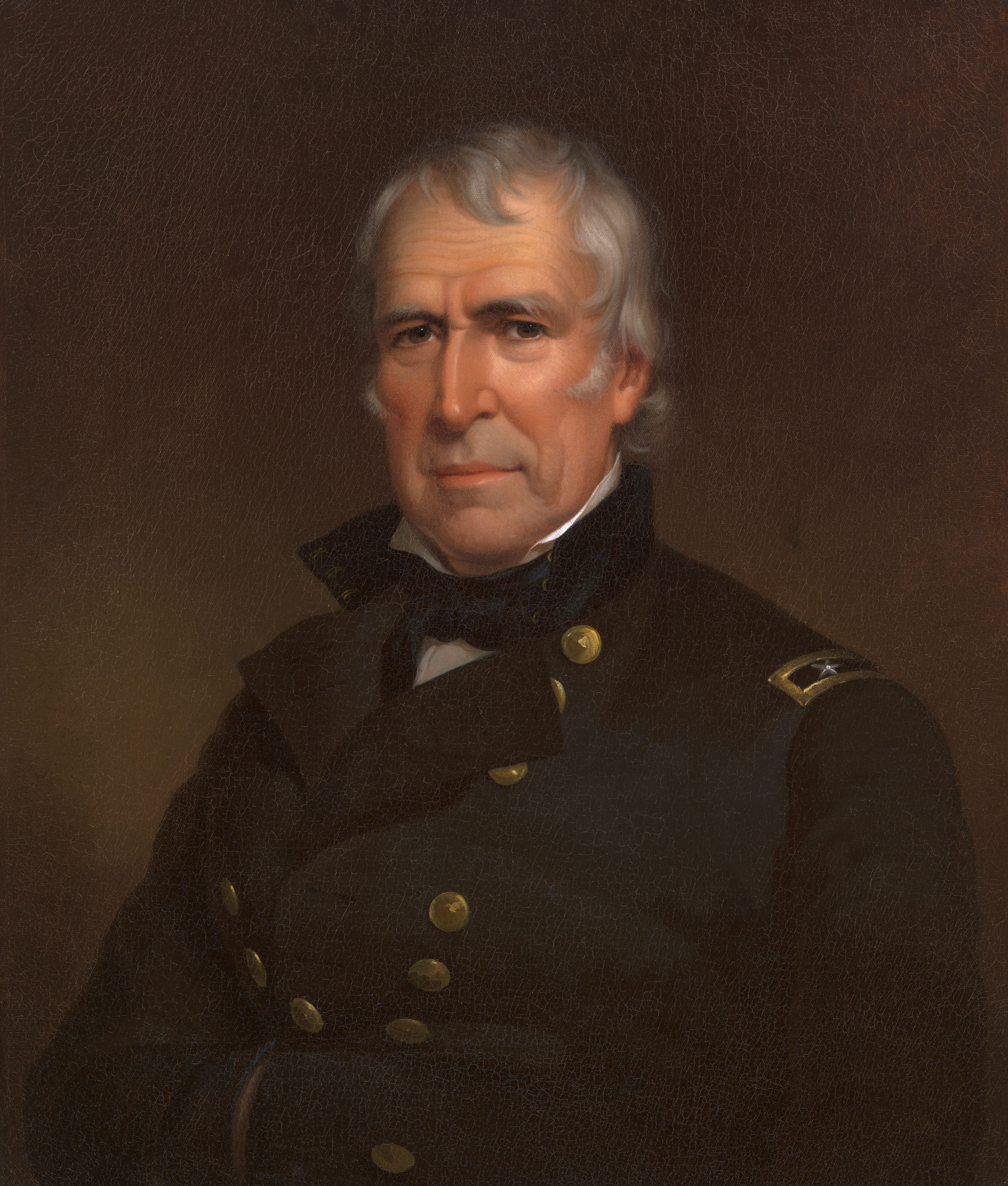
Zachary Taylor

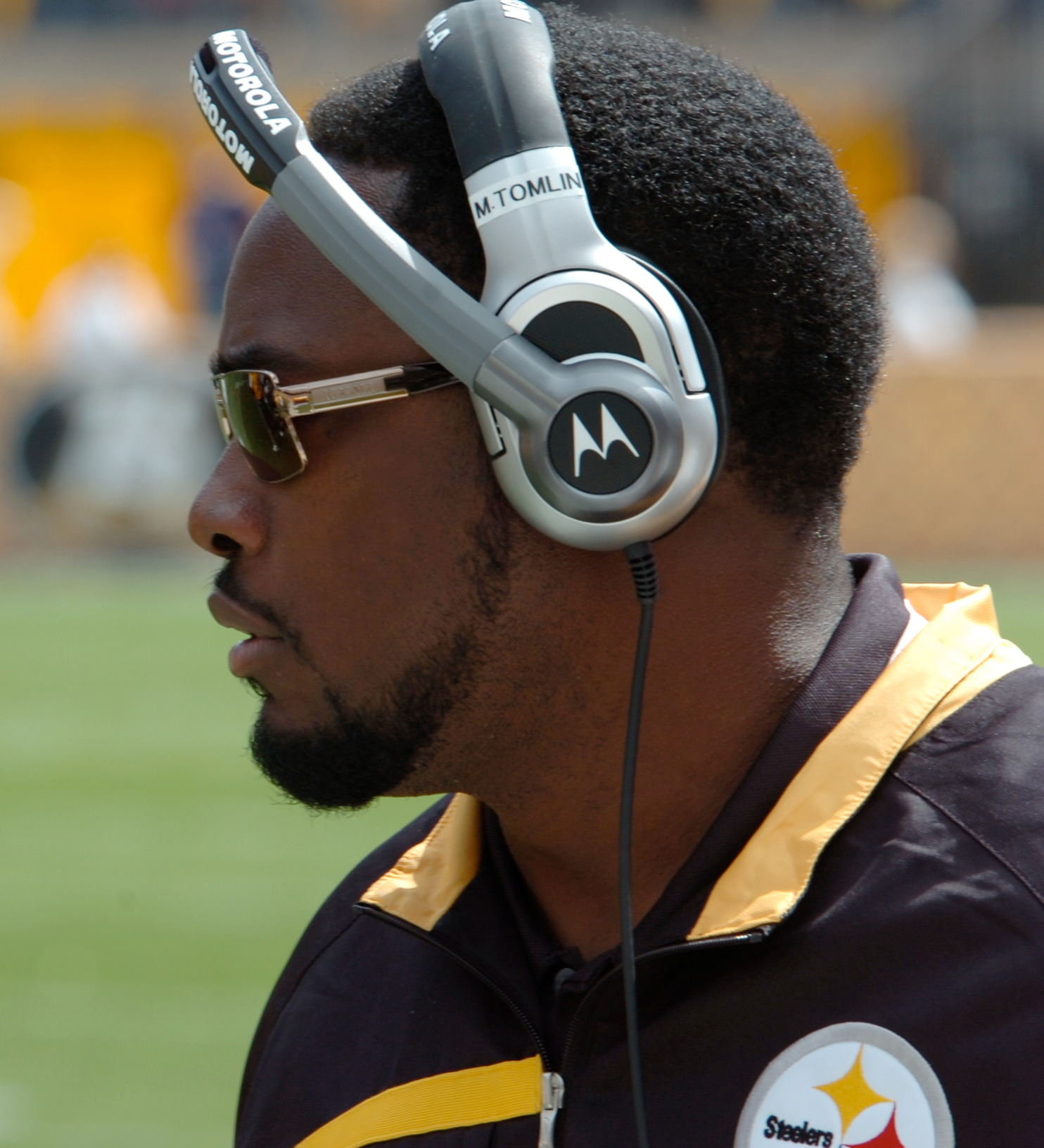
Mike Tomlin

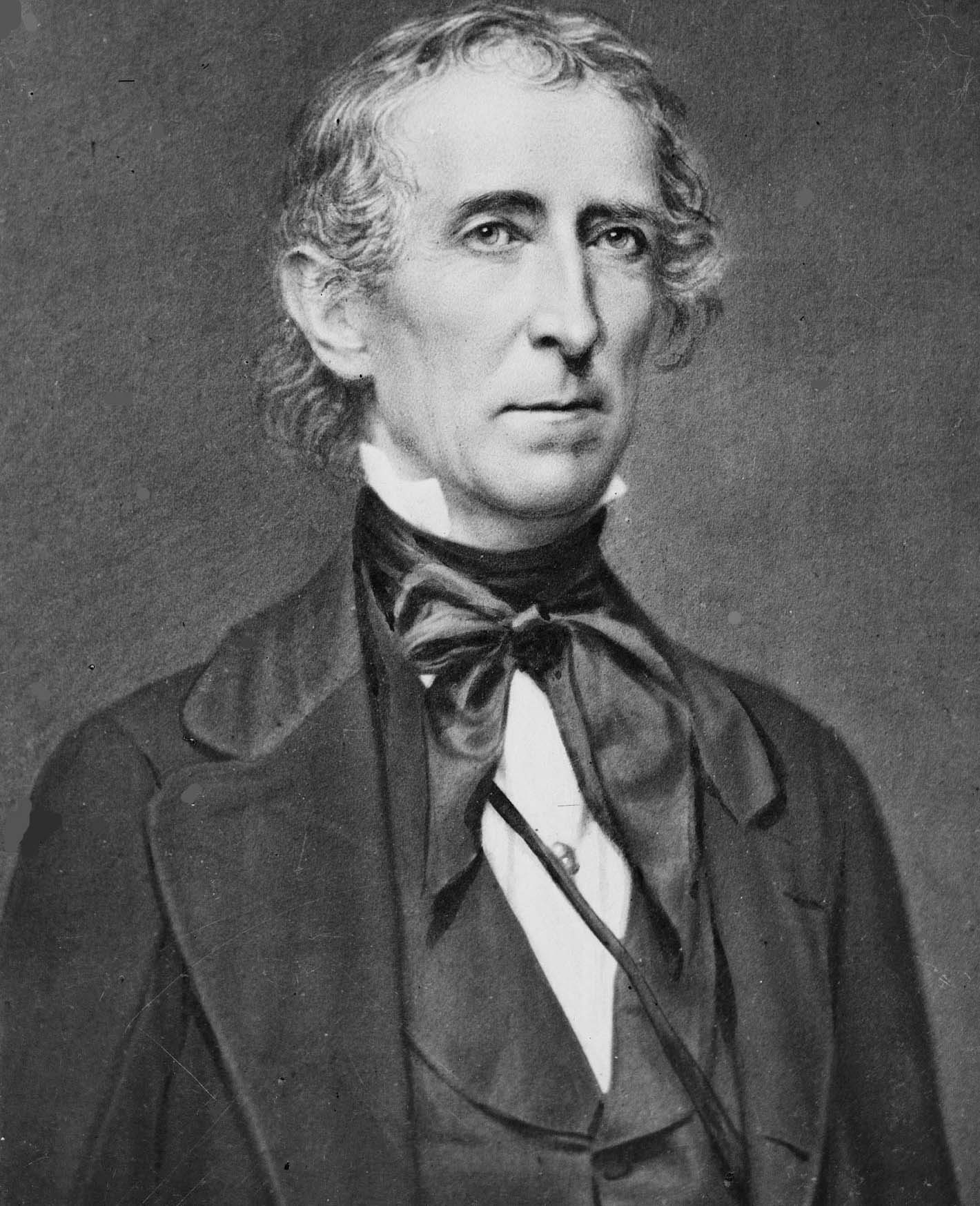
John Tyler

- Darryl Tapp (born 1984) – defensive end for Philadelphia Eagles
- Fran Tarkenton – Pro Football Hall of Fame quarterback for Minnesota Vikings; co-host of ABC-TV's That's Incredible
- Ben Tate (born 1988) – running back for Houston Texans
- Chris Taylor (born 1990) – baseball player for Los Angeles Dodgers
- Edmund Dick Taylor (1804–1891) – "Father of the Greenback"
- Lawrence Taylor (born 1959) – Pro Football Hall of Fame linebacker for New York Giants
- Peter Taylor (1917–1994) – writer; born in Tennessee, spent most of career teaching at University of Virginia
- Tyrod Taylor (born 1989) – quarterback for Buffalo Bills
- Zachary Taylor (1784–1850) – 12th president of the United States
- Lewis Temple – escaped African-American slave who invented a new kind of harpoon known as "Temple's Toggle"
- David Terrell – football player
- Logan Thomas (born 1991) – NFL tight end, played quarterback at Virginia Tech
- Scottie Thompson (born 1981) – actress, Jeanne Benoit on NCIS
- Lee Thornton (1941–2013) – journalist and correspondent for CBS, CNN, and NPR
- Matt Tifft (born 1996) – former NASCAR driver
- Timbaland (born 1974) – music producer and rapper
- Mike Tomlin (born 1972) – head coach of Pittsburgh Steelers, led team to Super Bowl XLIII championship
- Randy Tomlin – MLB pitcher; from Madison Heights
- Al Toon (born 1963) – retired football player for New York Jets
- Adrian Tracy (born 1988) – NFL and CFL defensive back
- Scott Travis (born 1961) – drummer for Judas Priest and Racer X
- Adriana Trigiani – writer, author of novel Big Stone Gap
- Curtis Turner (1924–1970) – stock car racer, member of NASCAR Hall of Fame
- Nat Turner (1800–1831) – leader of slave rebellion
- Leeann Tweeden (born 1973) – model, television personality
- Cy Twombly (1928–2011) – abstract artist
- John Tyler (1790–1862) – 10th president of the United States

== U ==
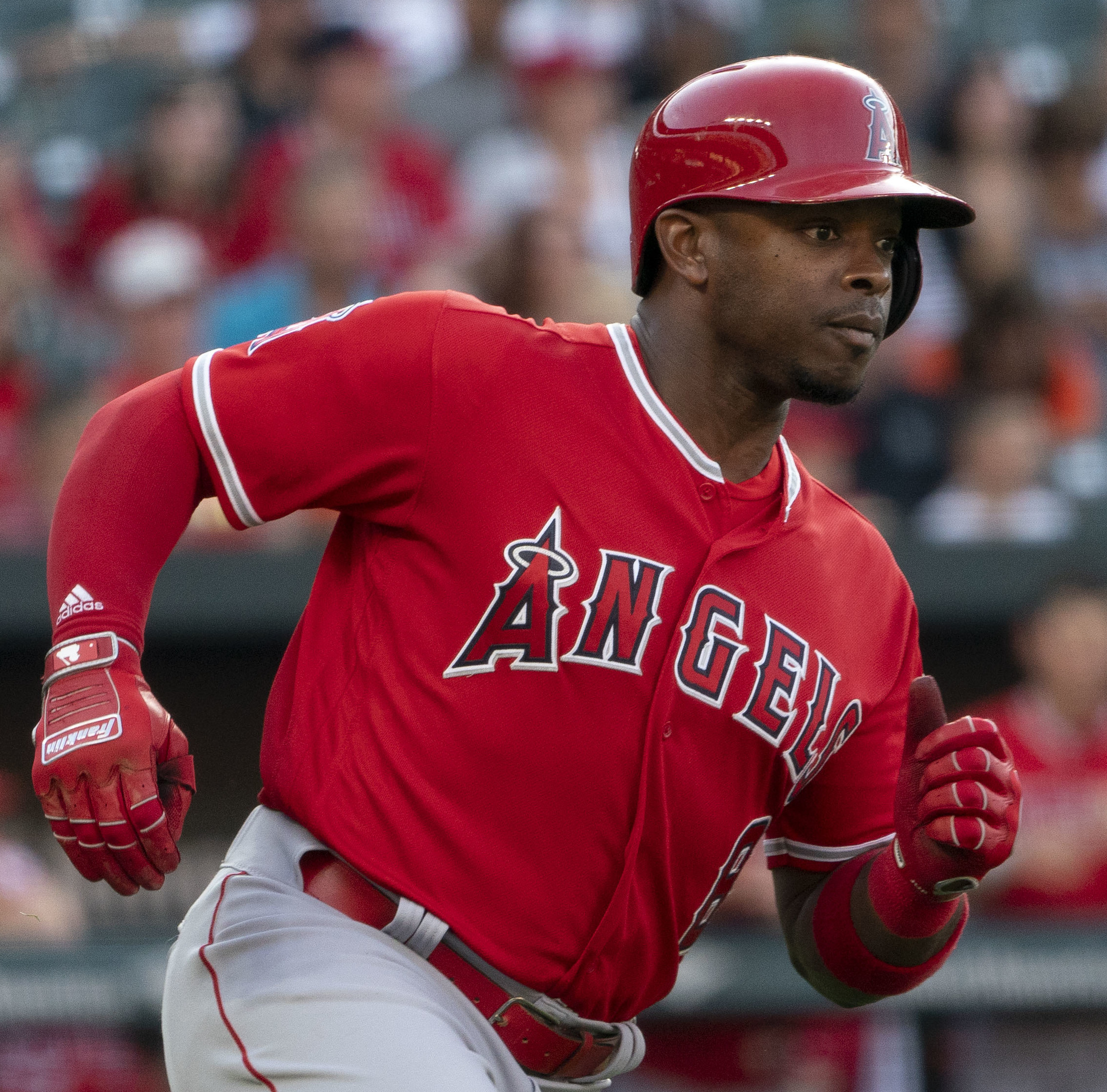
Justin Upton

- Kali Uchis – singer
- Skeet Ulrich – actor, starred in Scream, The Newton Boys, and Jericho
- B. J. Upton – MLB outfielder
- Justin Upton – MLB outfielder

== V ==
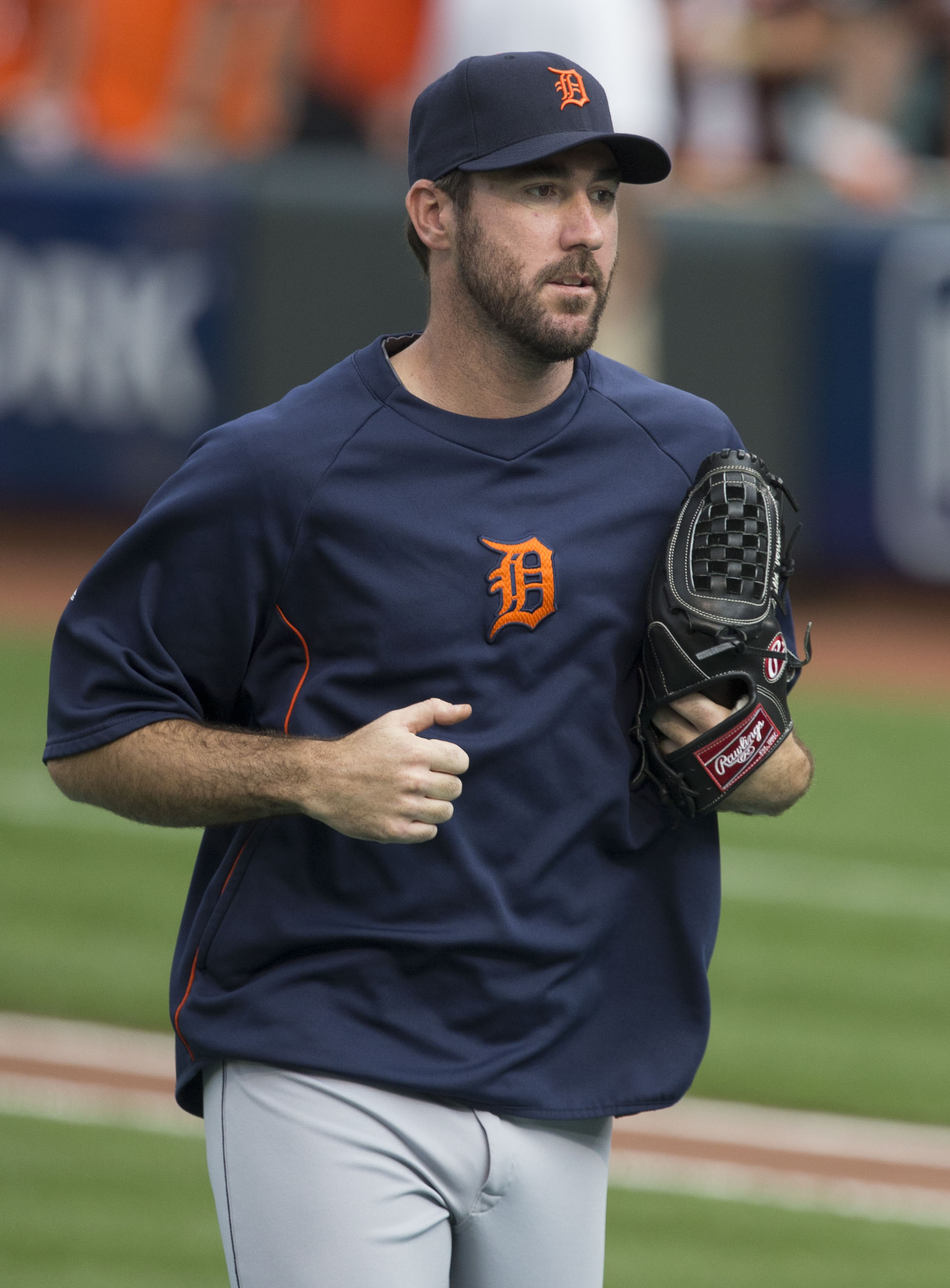
Justin Verlander

- S. S. Van Dine (1888–1939) – author, creator of Philo Vance
- Lila Meade Valentine (1865–1921) – education reformer, health-care advocate, and woman's suffragist
- Marc Vann (born 1954) – actor, Conrad Ecklie on CSI: Crime Scene Investigation
- Jarvis Varnado (born 1988) – professional basketball player, 2013 NBA champion with the Miami Heat
- Phil Vassar – country music singer/songwriter; from Lynchburg
- Julian Vaughn (born 1988) – professional basketball player
- Abraham B. Venable (1758–1811) – representative and senator from Virginia
- Brandon Vera (born 1977) – mixed martial artist
- Justin Verlander (born 1983) – Major League Baseball pitcher for Houston Astros
- Charles Vess (born 1951) – fantasy artist and comic-book illustrator
- Marcus Vick (born 1984) – NFL quarterback
- Michael Vick (born 1980) – NFL quarterback
- Gene Vincent (1935–1971) – musician who pioneered styles of rock and roll and rockabilly

== W ==
Wa–Wh

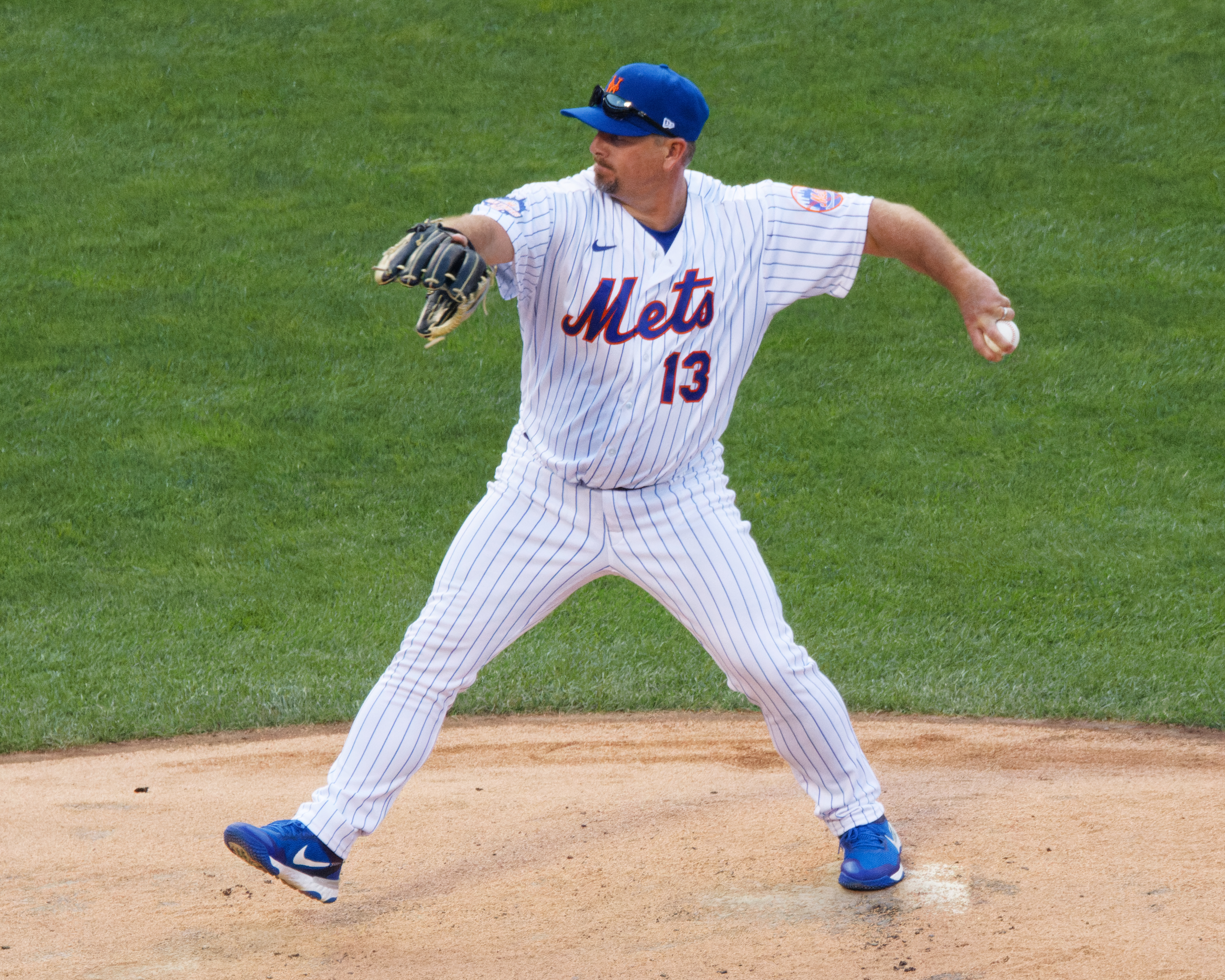
Billy Wagner

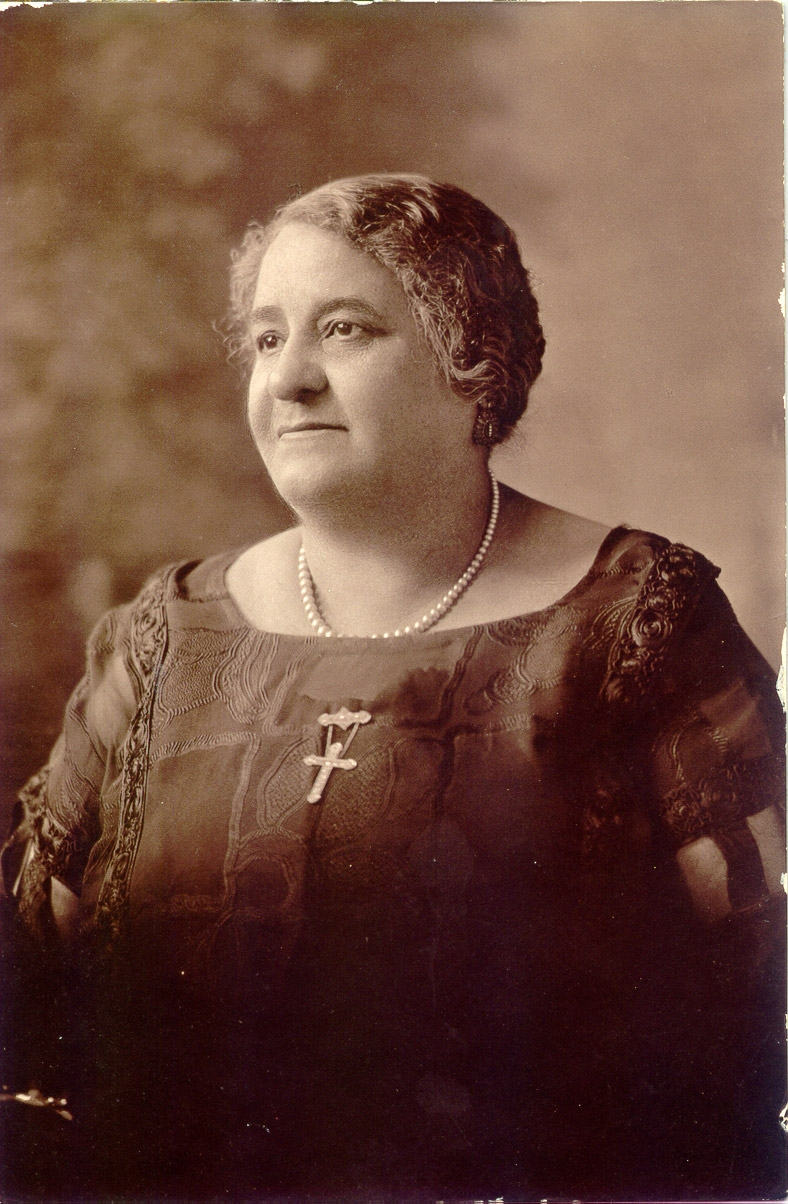
Maggie L. Walker

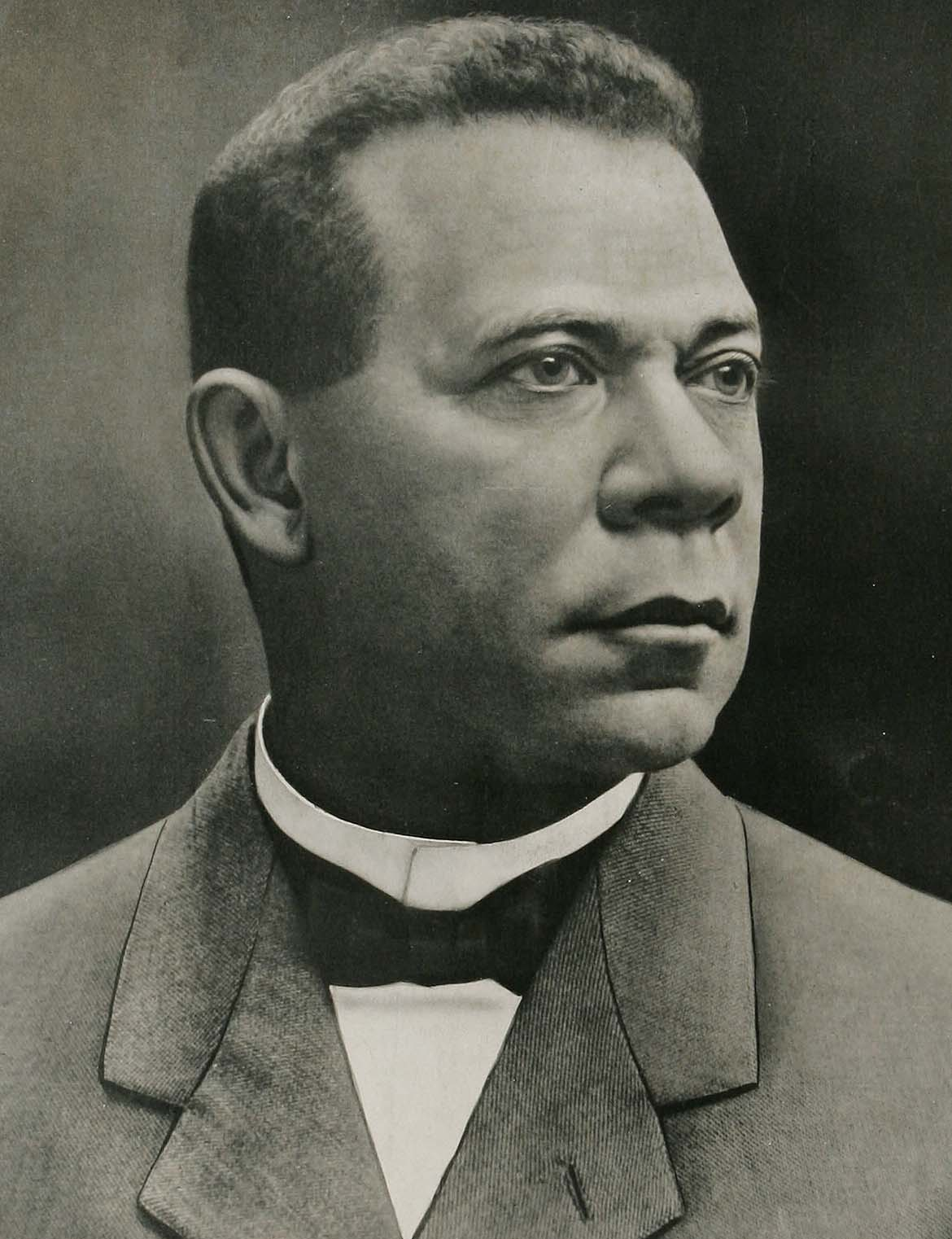
Booker T. Washington

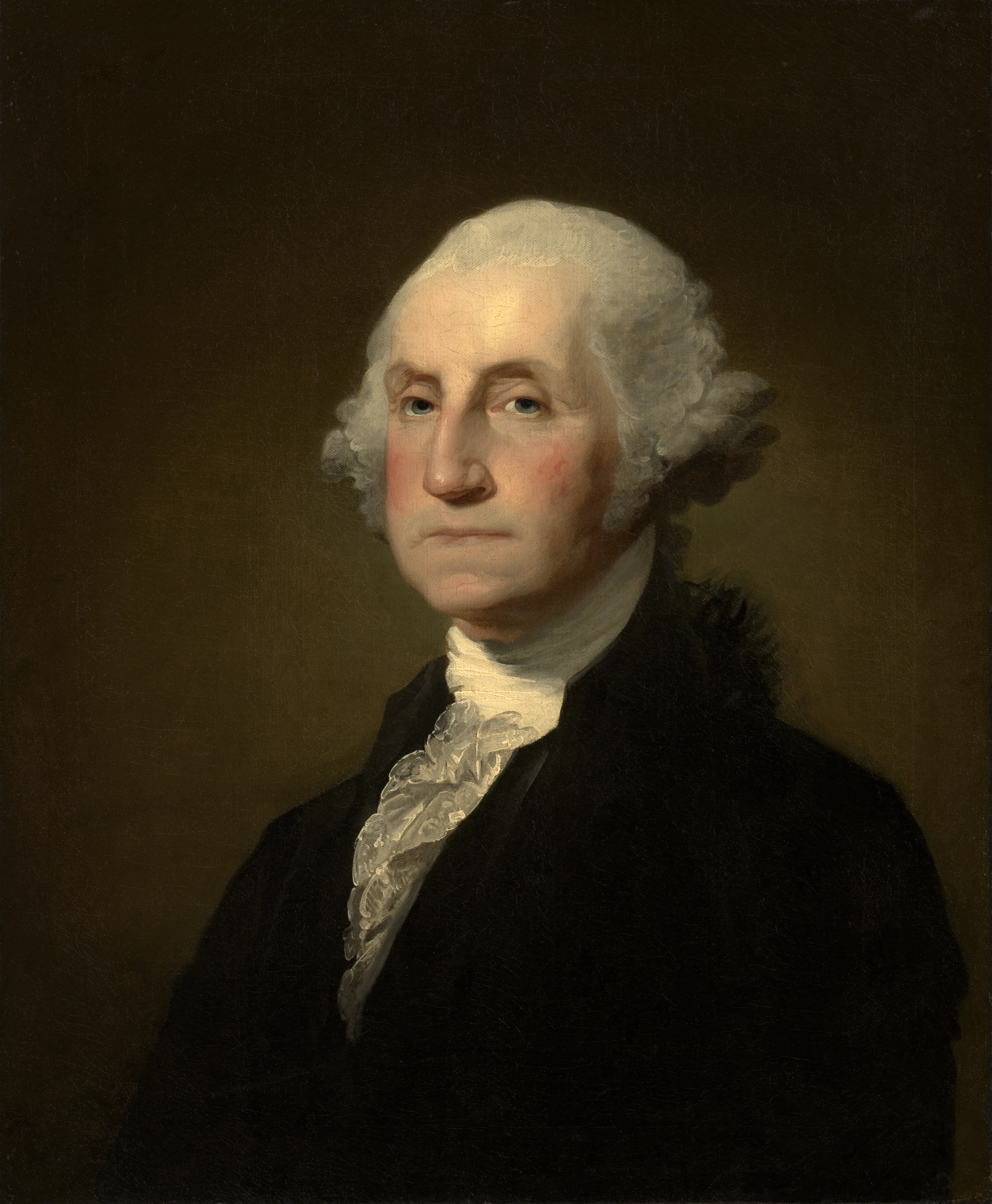
George Washington

- Bobby Wadkins – professional golfer
- Lanny Wadkins – professional golfer
- Amina Wadud – Islamic Virginia Commonwealth University professor
- Mark Warner (born 1954) – senior United States senator of Virginia
- Billy Wagner (born 1971) – retired MLB pitcher, primarily for Houston Astros and New York Mets; also pitched for Ferrum College
- Richard Wagoner – former president of General Motors
- Maggie L. Walker – first woman to found a bank in U.S.
- Travis Wall (born 1971) – reality-television personality, So You Think You Can Dance, Season 2
- Ben Wallace – NBA basketball player
- Randall Wallace – writer, director, Braveheart, Pearl Harbor, We Were Soldiers
- Dylan Walsh § – actor, Nip/Tuck, Brooklyn South, Gabriel's Fire
- Booker T. Washington (1856–1915) – iconic educator, activist, founder of Tuskegee Institute
- George Washington (1732–1799) – 1st president of the United States, commander-in-chief of Continental Army in the American Revolutionary War, "Father of Our Country"
- Kelley Washington (born 1979) – wide receiver for Baltimore Ravens
- Benjamin Watson (born 1980) – tight end for New Orleans Saints
- B. W. Webb (born 1990) – cornerback for Dallas Cowboys
- Haley Webb – actress
- Tyler Webb – pitcher for the St. Louis Cardinals
- Brianté Weber (born 1992) – basketball player in the Israeli Basketball Premier League
- Susan Archer Weiss (1822–1917) – poet
- Josh Wells – offensive tackle for Jacksonville Jaguars
- Kellie Wells – track hurdler, 2012 Olympic bronze medalist
- Paul Wellstone § (1944–2002) – member of U.S. Senate from Minnesota
- Jennifer Wexton (born 1968) – U.S. representative of Virginia's 10th congressional district
- Suzanne Whang – television host, actress, House Hunters, Las Vegas
- Pernell Whitaker – professional boxer
- Jason White – NASCAR driver
- Lucky Whitehead – wide receiver for Dallas Cowboys

Wi–Wz

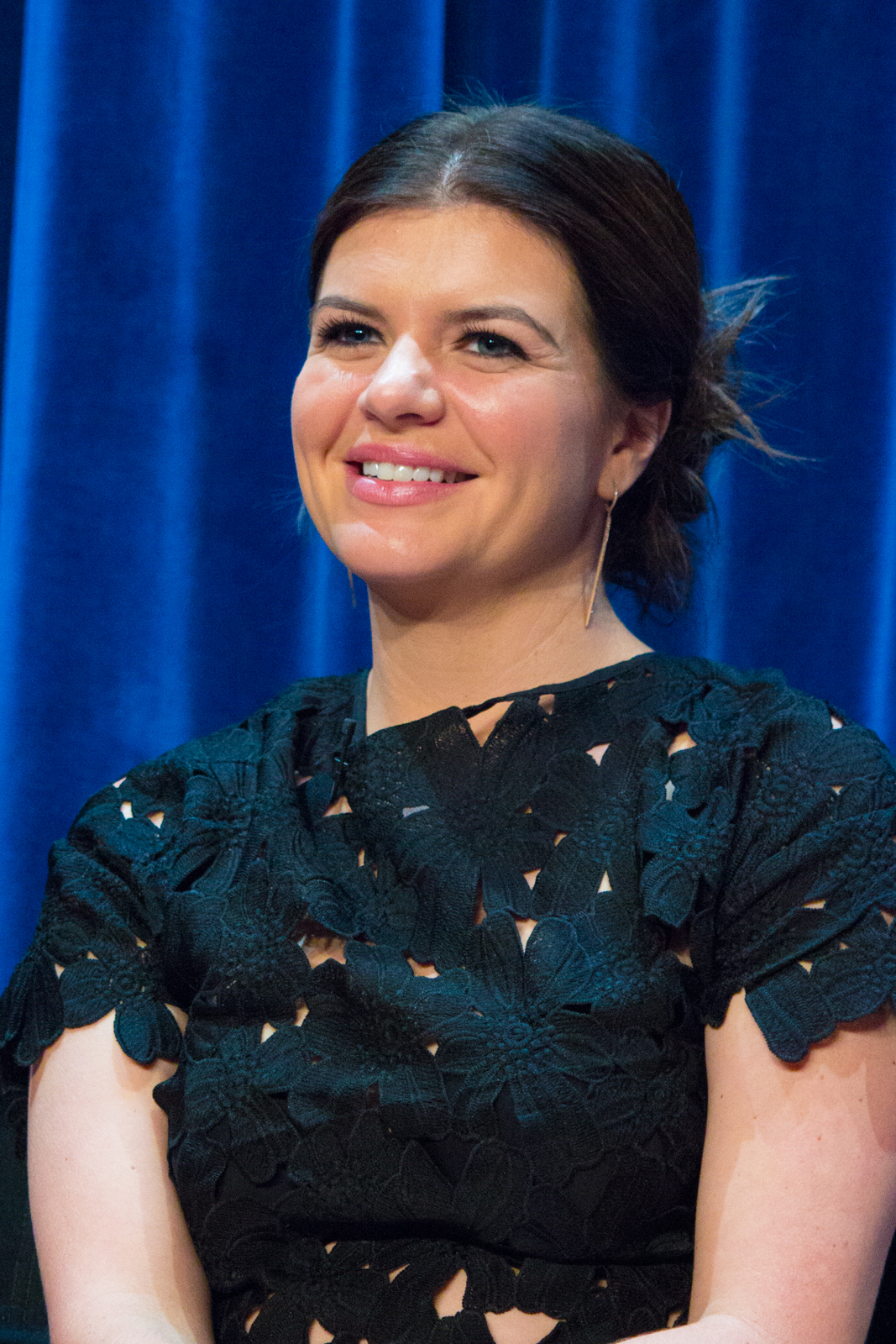
Casey Wilson

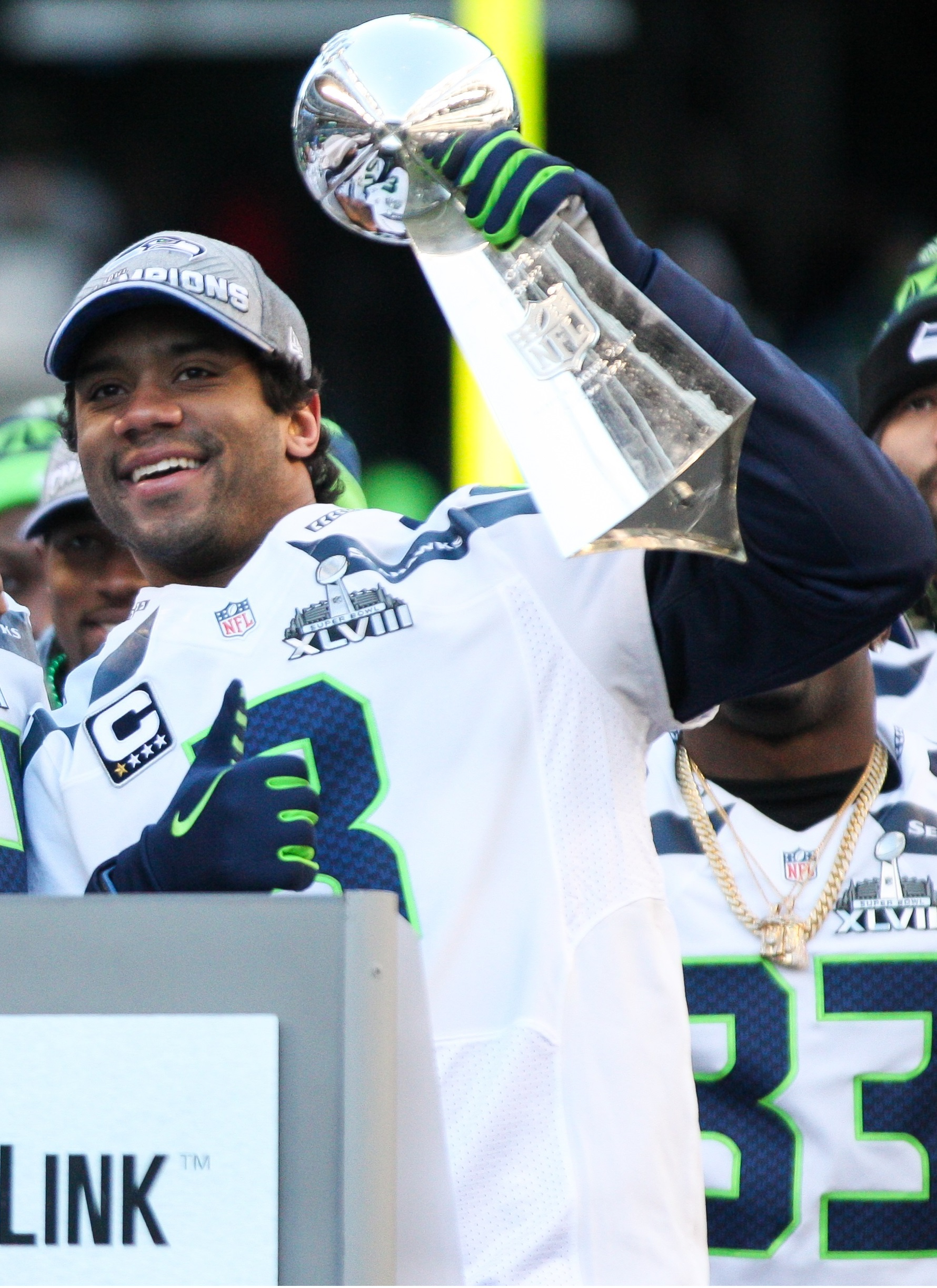
Russell Wilson

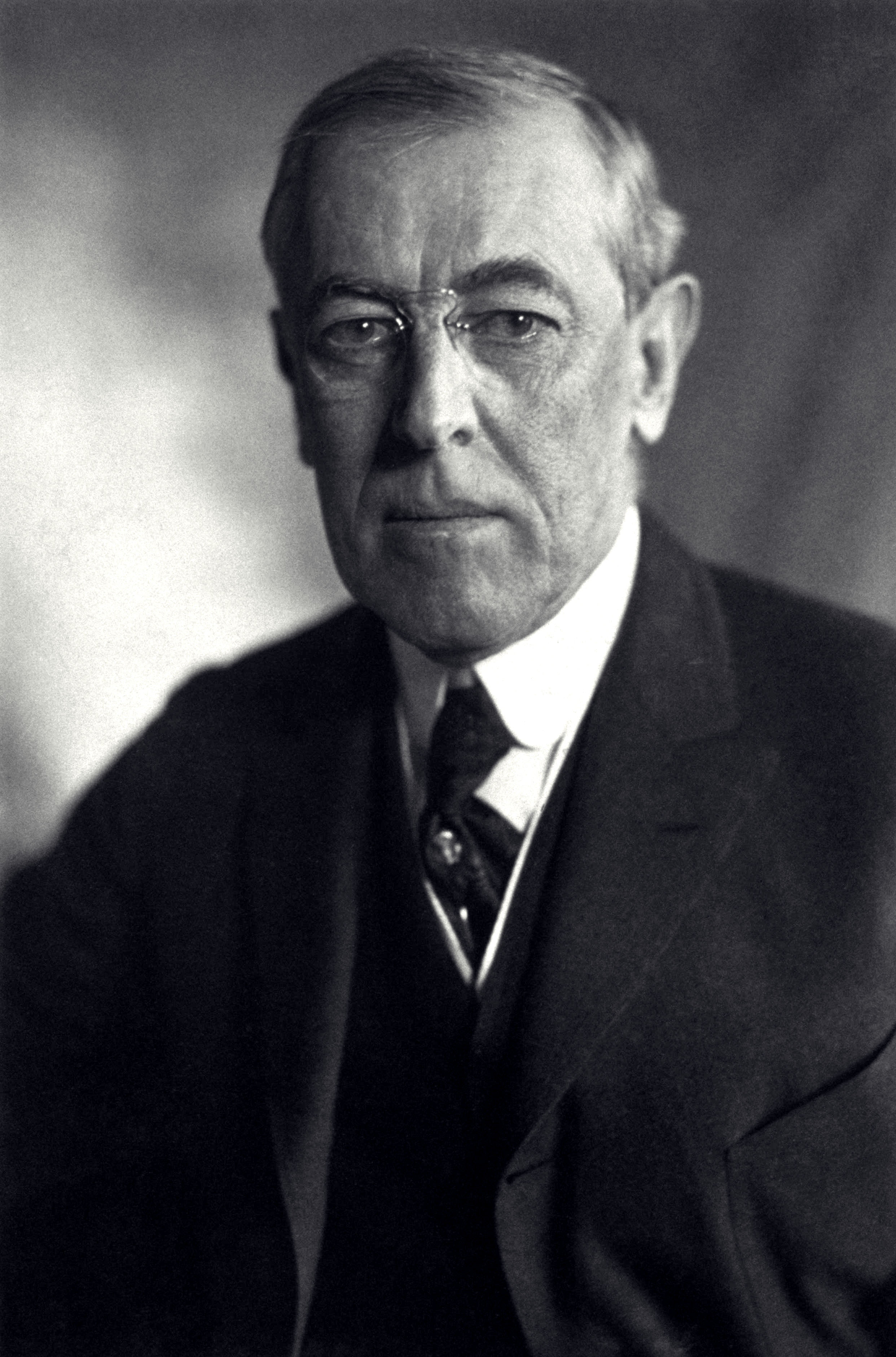
Woodrow Wilson

- Tom Wiggin § (born 1955) – actor, Kirk Anderson on As the World Turns and Joe Foster on Texas
- L. Douglas Wilder (born 1931) – first elected African-American governor of U.S. state (governor of Virginia, 1990–1994), Richmond City mayor
- Jenny Wiley § (1760–1831) – pioneer, Native American captive
- Daryl Williams (born 1992) – offensive tackle for Carolina Panthers
- Keller Williams (born 1970) – musician
- Kiely Williams – member of 3LW and The Cheetah Girls, actress The House Bunny
- Monty Williams – former NBA player; head coach for New Orleans Hornets
- Pharrell Williams (born 1973) – Grammy Award-winning musician and producer, one-half of The Neptunes
- Reggie Williams (born 1986) – NBA basketball player
- Steven Williams § (born 1949) – actor, 21 Jump Street, L.A. Heat, Linc's
- Carl Willis (born 1960) – MLB pitcher and coach
- Curtis Wilkerson (born 1961) – MLB player for four teams
- Casey Wilson (born 1980) – actress, comedian, Happy Endings, Saturday Night Live
- David Wilson (born 1991) – running back for New York Giants
- Patrick Wilson (born 1973) – actor, Nite Owl II in Watchmen, The Conjuring, Fargo
- Russell Wilson § – quarterback for Seattle Seahawks
- Samuel V. Wilson (1923–2017) – United States Army lieutenant general
- Woodrow Wilson (1856–1924) – 28th president of the United States
- Annie Steger Winston (1862-1927) – writer
- Stan Winston – film special-effects designer
- Henry Wise Jr. (1920–2003) – physician and World War II Tuskegee Airman fighter pilot
- Julia A. Wood (1840–1927) – writer and composer
- Tom Wolfe (1930–2018) – journalist, novelist, father of "New Journalism"
- Robert J. Wood (1905–1986) – U.S. Army four-star general
- Josh Woodrum (born 1992) – quarterback for Washington Redskins
- Carter G. Woodson (1875–1950) – African-American historian, author, founder of the Association for the Study of African American Life and History
- Damien Woody (born 1977) – retired offensive lineman for New York Jets
- Link Wray – guitarist
- David Wright (born 1982) – third baseman for New York Mets
- Avis Wyatt (born 1984) – professional basketball player
- Kerry Wynn (born 1991) – defensive end for New York Giants
- Robert E. Wynn – member of Easy Company, Band of Brothers (1921–2000)
- George Wythe (1726–1806) – Hampton; first professor of law in American college, William & Mary

== Y ==
- Rachael Yamagata – singer-songwriter
- Elliott Yamin § (born 1978) – American Idol finalist
- Marl Young (1917–2009) – composer, music director, Here's Lucy
- Megan Young (born 1990) – actress, model, TV host

== Z ==
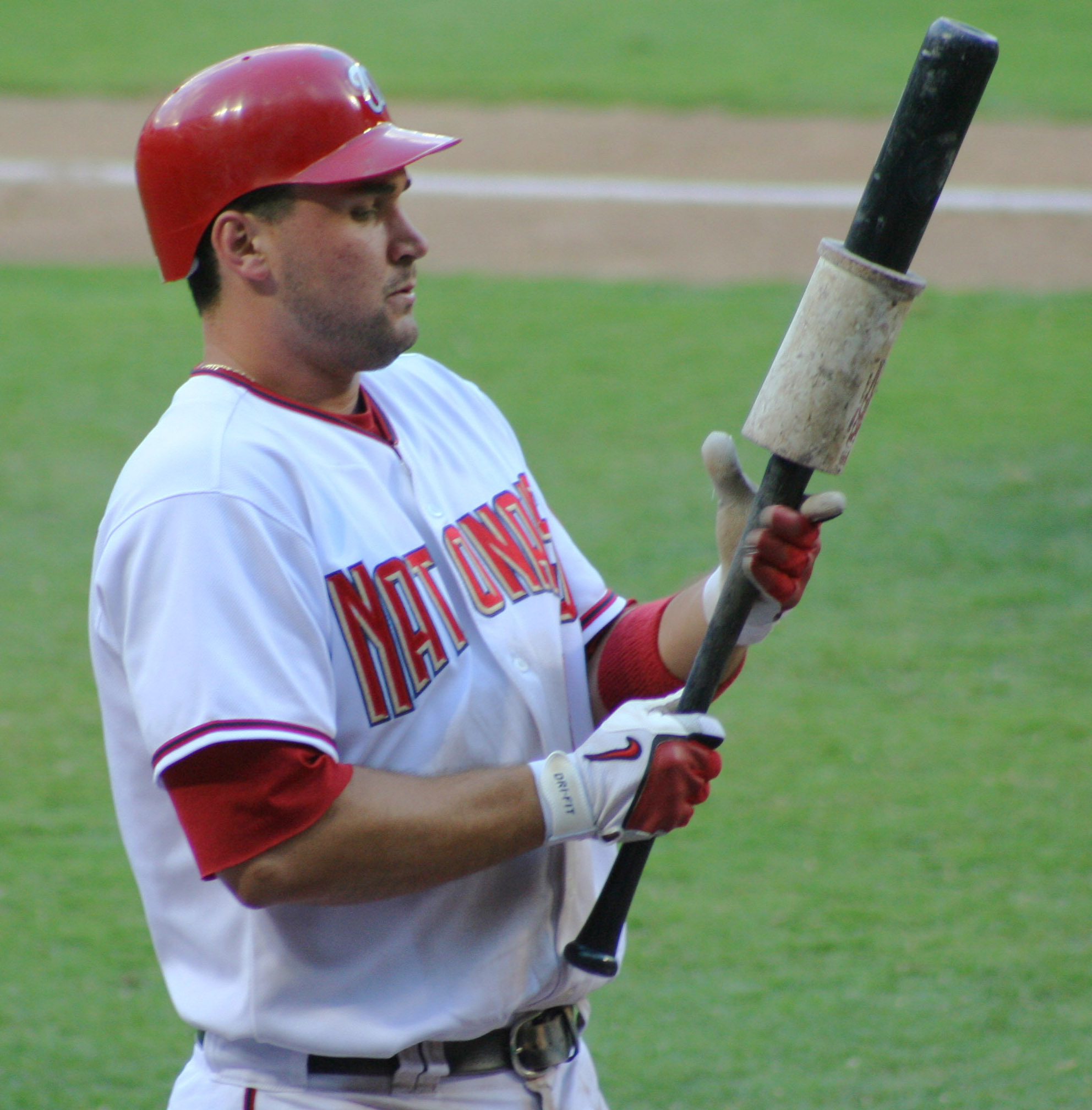
Ryan Zimmerman

- John G. Zehmer Jr. (1942–2016) – architectural historian, preservationist, photographer, and author of architectural history
- Gerald Zerkin (born 1949) – lawyer
- Emanuel Zervakis (1930–2003) – NASCAR Cup Series driver
- Zeda Zhang (born 1987) – professional wrestler
- Boris Zhukov (born 1959) – professional wrestler
- George Zimmerman (born 1983) – man responsible for fatally shooting Trayvon Martin in Sanford, Florida
- Ryan Zimmerman § (born 1984) – first baseman for the Washington Nationals
- Nell Zink (born 1964) – novelist
- Charlotte Zolotow (1915–2013) – writer, poet, publisher of children's books
- Zach Zwinak (born 1992) – former Penn State football running back

== See also ==
By educational institution affiliation

- List of College of William & Mary alumni
- List of presidents of the College of William & Mary
- List of Hampden–Sydney College alumni
- List of Liberty University people
- List of presidents of Longwood University
- List of University of Richmond people
- List of University of Virginia people
- List of Virginia Commonwealth University alumni
- List of Virginia Tech alumni
- List of Virginia Theological Seminary people
- List of Washington and Lee University people

By governmental office

- List of attorneys general of Virginia
- List of colonial governors of Virginia
- List of governors of Virginia
- List of justices of the Supreme Court of Virginia
- List of United States representatives from Virginia
- List of United States senators from Virginia

By location

- List of people from Annandale, Virginia
- List of people from Arlington, Virginia
- List of people from Charlottesville, Virginia
- List of people from Great Falls, Virginia
- List of people from Hampton Roads, Virginia
- List of people from McLean, Virginia
- List of people from Reston, Virginia

Other

- List of Virginia suffragists
