= List of Catholic University of America people =

The following is a list of notable alumni of the Catholic University of America, the national university of the Roman Catholic Church in the United States, located in Washington, D.C.

Various names could appear on this list twice, but will only appear in the area for which they are best known. For example, several in the Arts category could appear in more than one subcategory. Others could appear in several categories, but have been relegated to one.

== Alumni ==
=== Religion ===
==== Beati and other Servants of God ====
- Thea Bowman, FSPA, 1969, and a Ph.D. in 1972, Servant of God, M.A. in English
- Theodore Foley, CP, 1943 and STD, 1944, Servant of God, Passionist priest and Superior General; STL
- Emil J. Kapaun, Master of Arts in education, 1948, Servant of God, priest, World War II and Korean War US Army chaplain, US Medal of Honor recipient
- Fulton J. Sheen, 1920, and faculty 1926–1950 in theology and philosophy, Venerable, J.C.B., auxiliary bishop of New York and bishop of Rochester, host of Life Is Worth Living

==== Cardinals ====
- Joseph Bernardin, archbishop of Chicago
- Raymond Leo Burke, patron of the Sovereign Military Order of Malta and archbishop emeritus of Saint Louis
- Terence Cooke, M.A. 1949 and M.S.W. 1949, Servant of God, archbishop of New York
- Blase J. Cupich, S.T.L. 1979, S.T.D. 1987, archbishop of Chicago
- Daniel DiNardo, B.A., M.A., archbishop of Galveston-Houston
- Timothy Dolan, Ph.D. 1985, archbishop of New York
- Francis George, M.A. 1966, archbishop of Chicago
- Patrick Joseph Hayes, S.T.L. 1894, archbishop of New York
- James Hickey, S.T.L. 1946, archbishop of Washington
- Lubomyr Husar, Ukrainian Greek major archbishop of Kyiv and Halych
- John Krol, J.C.D. 1942, archbishop of Philadelphia
- Roger Mahony, M.S.W. 1964, archbishop of Los Angeles
- Theodore McCarrick, Ph.D. 1963, archbishop of Washington
- Humberto Sousa Medeiros, M.A. 1942, S.T.L. 1946, archbishop of Boston
- Sean O'Malley, O.F.M.Cap. Ph.D. 1978, archbishop-emeritus of Boston
- Justin Rigali, S.T.B. 1961, archbishop of Philadelphia
- Jan Pieter Schotte, secretary general of the Synod of Bishops and president of the Labour Office of the Apostolic See
- Luis Antonio Tagle, S.T.L. 1987, S.T.D. 1991, Dean of the College of Cardinals (2026–present), Pro-Prefect of the Section for First Evangelization and New Particular Churches of the Dicastery for Evangelization (2022–present), former Prefect of the Congregation for the Evangelization of Peoples (2020-2022), former Archbishop of Manila (2011-2019), and former Bishop of Imus (2001-2011)
- Donald Wuerl, M.A. 1962, archbishop-emeritus of Washington

==== Bishops ====
- David William Antonio, S.T.D. 1999, bishop of Ilagan (Philippines)
- Gerald Barbarito, J.C.L. 1983, bishop of Palm Beach
- J. Kevin Boland, bishop of Savannah
- Earl Boyea, Ph.D. 1987, bishop of Lansing
- Michael J. Bransfield, M.Phil. 1973, bishop of Wheeling-Charleston
- Robert J. Carlson, J.C.L. 1979, archbishop of St. Louis
- Charles J. Chaput, archbishop of Philadelphia
- David R. Choby, bishop of Nashville
- John Bosco Manat Chuabsamai, M.A. 1977, bishop of Ratchaburi (Thailand)
- Robert J. Cunningham, J.C.L. 1978, bishop of Ogdensburg
- Edward Celestin Daly, OP, J.C.D. 1923, bishop of Des Moines
- Bohdan Danylo, 1996, bishop of Saint Josaphat in Parma
- Frank J. Dewane, M.A. 1975, bishop of Venice in Florida
- Maurice John Dingman, J.C.L. 1946, bishop of Des Moines
- Pierre DuMaine, D.Ed. 1961, bishop of San Jose
- Fidelis Fernando, Ph.D. 1987, bishop of Mannar (Sri Lanka)
- Raphael M. Fliss, S.T.L., former bishop of Superior
- Roger J. Foys, bishop of Covington, Kentucky
- John Mark Gannon, S.T.B. 1900, S.T.L. 1901, bishop of Erie
- Francis Joseph Gossman, J.C.D. 1959, bishop of Raleigh
- Francis J. Haas, bishop of Grand Rapids, 1943–1953
- Bernard J. Harrington, Ed.M. 1958, bishop of Winona
- Gary W. Janak, J.C.L., 1995, auxiliary bishop of San Antonio
- Charles M. Jarrell, B.A. 1962, M.A. 1963, bishop of Lafayette in Louisiana
- William Michael Joensen, Ph.D. 2001, bishop of Des Moines
- James Vann Johnston, Jr., J.C.L. 1996, bishop of Springfield–Cape Girardeau, bishop of Kansas City–Saint Joseph
- Donald Joseph Kettler, J.C.L. 1982, bishop of Fairbanks
- Daniel Kucera, OSB, M.A., Ph.D. 1954, bishop of Salina, archbishop of Dubuque
- John J. Leibrecht, Ph.D. 1961, bishop of Springfield–Cape Girardeau
- Oscar Hugh Lipscomb, Ph.D. 1963, archbishop of Mobile
- Martin N. Lohmuller, J.C.D. 1947, auxiliary bishop of Philadelphia
- William E. Lori, S.T.D. 1982, archbishop of Baltimore
- Paul Loverde, J.C.L. 1982, bishop of Arlington
- Henry J. Mansell, archbishop of Hartford
- John Joseph Mitty, S.T.B. 1907, archbishop of San Francisco
- Robert F. Morneau, auxiliary bishop of Green Bay
- Robert W. Muench, Ed.M. 1968, bishop of Baton Rouge
- Michael Joseph Murphy, S.T.L. 1942, bishop of Erie
- James A. Murray, J.C.L. 1964, bishop of Kalamazoo
- George H. Niederauer, S.T.B. 1960, archbishop of San Francisco
- David M. O'Connell, J.C.L. 1987, J.C.D. 1990, bishop of Trenton
- Stuart France O'Connell SM, MA 1984, bishop of Rarotonga (Cook Islands)
- Michael F. Olson, MA 1989, bishop of Fort Worth
- Wolodymyr Paska, J.C.D. 1975, auxiliary bishop of Philadelphia (Ukrainian)
- Joseph Perry, J.C.L. 1981, auxiliary bishop of Chicago
- John C. Reiss, J.C.D. 1954, bishop of Trenton
- John H. Ricard, Ph.D., bishop of Pensacola-Tallahassee
- Thomas J. Rodi, J.C.L. 1986, archbishop of Mobile
- Henry Rohlman, MA 1907, bishop of Davenport, archbishop of Dubuque
- Dennis Schnurr, J.C.D. 1980, archbishop of Cincinnati
- John Mortimer Smith, S.T.B. 1961, J.C.D. 1966, bishop of Trenton
- Stefan Soroka, B.S.T. 1982, D.S.W. 1985, metropolitan archbishop of the Ukrainian Greek-Catholic Church in the United States
- John J. Ward, J.C.L. 1952, auxiliary bishop of Los Angeles
- Loras Joseph Watters, S.T.L. 1941, Ph.D. 1954, auxiliary bishop of Dubuque, bishop of Winona
- Thomas Jerome Welsh, bishop of Arlington and bishop of Allentown
- Aloysius John Wycislo, bishop of Green Bay
- Gabino Zavala, J.C.L., auxiliary bishop of Los Angeles
- Thomas Zinkula, M.A. 1990, bishop of Davenport, archbishop of Dubuque

==== Former priests ====
- Nancy Ledins, former priest and former member of the Missionaries of the Precious Blood; later came out as a transgender woman

==== Members of monastic orders ====
- Mary Collins

=== Public service and politics ===
==== Federal ====
- Charlene Barshefsky, J.D. 1975, ambassador, United States Trade Representative under Bill Clinton
- Robert Patrick Casey, Jr., J.D. 1988, U.S. senator from Pennsylvania
- Jeffrey Chiesa, J.D. 1990, U.S. senator from New Jersey
- Thomas E. Donilon, B.A. 1977, National Security Advisor
- Edward W. Gillespie, B.A. 1983, former chairman of the Republican National Committee
- Patrick Guerriero, B.A. 1990, executive director of the Log Cabin Republicans
- Luis Guinot, former United States ambassador to Costa Rica
- Thomas R. Harkin, J.D. 1972, U.S. senator from Iowa
- John P. Hart, president and CEO of the American Democracy Institute
- Kathy Hochul, J.D. 1984, U.S. representative and governor of New York
- Sara Dunlap Jackson, National Archives and Records Administration archivist, Military Archives Division
- Emmett Joseph Leahy (1910–1964), archivist and entrepreneur, pioneer in the discipline of records management
- Craig Martell, B.A. 1987, inaugural Chief Digital and Artificial Intelligence Officer for the U.S. Department of Defense
- Victor McCrary, B.A. 1978, vice chair of the National Science Board
- Thomas P. Melady, Ph.D. 1955, former U.S. ambassador to the Holy See, Burundi, and Uganda
- Jack Miller, United States senator from Iowa
- Wanda Peters, B.S. NASA administrator and member of the Senior Executive Service
- Richard G. Renzi, J.D. 2002, U.S. congressman from Arizona
- Kathleen Rice, B.A. 1987, U.S. congressman from New York State
- John E. Straub, B.A. 1991, director of the White House Office of Administration
- Robert Francis Anthony Studds, B.S. 1917, United States Coast and Geodetic Survey Corps admiral and engineer, fourth director of the United States Coast and Geodetic Survey
- Robert Tiernan, J.D. 1956, U.S. congressman from Rhode Island
- Genevievette Walker-Lightfoot, J.D. 1999, former U.S. Securities and Exchange Commission attorney

==== State ====
- Forrest H. Anderson, J.D. 1938, former governor of Montana
- Martin Connor, B.A. J.D. former New York State Senate minority leader
- Ryan Fecteau, B.A. 2014, Maine House of Representatives
- Reed Gusciora, B.A. New Jersey General Assemblyman
- Mitchell J. Landrieu, B.A. 1982, mayor of New Orleans and former lieutenant governor of Louisiana
- Agnes Mary Mansour, president of Mercy College of Detroit 1971–1983, director of the Michigan Department of Community Health 1983–1987
- Terence R. McAuliffe, B.A. 1979, former governor of Virginia and former chairman of the Democratic National Committee
- Jim McGreevey, attended but did not graduate, former governor of New Jersey
- Kelly Noonan Murphy, B.D. 1997, member of the Maine House of Representatives
- Daniel O'Donnell, New York State Assembly member
- Martin O'Malley, B.A. 1985, former mayor of Baltimore, Maryland and former governor of Maryland
- Brian E. Rumpf, B.A. New Jersey general assemblyman
- Holly Schepisi, B.A. New Jersey general assemblywoman
- William J. Shea, J.D. 1926, Connecticut Supreme Court justice
- Henry P. Sullivan (1916–2003), B.A. Democratic state representative and senator in New Hampshire
- Brandon Umba, B.A. 2008, New Jersey general assemblyman

==== Local ====
- Joseph Alioto, 1940, mayor of San Francisco
- Joseph H. Gainer, 1902, 26th mayor of Providence, Rhode Island

==== Other (public service and politics) ====
- Thomasina Jordan, Ed.D., American Indian activist
- Hani Miletski, Israeli senior representative of the Defense Mission to the U.S. for Strategic Defense Initiative Programs
- Jerome G. Miller, D.S.W. 1965, advocate for alternatives to incarceration and the deinstitutionalization of persons with developmental disabilities
- Tom G. Palmer, M.A., senior fellow at the Cato Institute and director of the institute's educational division
- Timothy Perry Shriver, M.A. 1989, CEO of the Special Olympics
- Jesús Permuy, Cuban-American human rights activist, urban planner, and community leader
- Aurelia Pucinski, Illinois judge
- James Soong, M.S. 1971, Taiwanese politician and founder of the People First Party

=== Arts and letters ===
==== Film and television ====
- Susan Anspach, 1961, did not graduate, actress
- Norma Candal, actress and comedian
- Pat Carroll, B.A. 1989, Emmy Award-winning actress, voice of Ursula in Disney’s The Little Mermaid
- Mary Alice Dwyer-Dobbin, television producer
- Marc Gervais, M.F.A. 1960, Jesuit, writer, film consultant, film professor at Concordia University 1967–2003
- Henry Gibson, cast member of Rowan and Martin's Laugh-In
- John Heard, actor, Peter McCallister from the first two Home Alone films
- Saeed Jaffrey, Indian actor and Fulbright scholar
- Laurence Luckinbill, M.F.A. 1958, Emmy Award-winning producer, writer, actor
- John Carroll Lynch, actor, played Drew Carey's brother on The Drew Carey Show
- Ed McMahon, B.A. 1949, announcer on The Tonight Show Starring Johnny Carson and host of Star Search
- Kathleen McInerney, B.A., voice actress, Ash Ketchum seasons 1–8 on Pokémon
- David L. Paterson, B.A. 1989, producer and screenwriter of Disney's Bridge to Terabithia
- Colleen Zenk Pinter, Emmy Award-winning actress, known for her role on As the World Turns
- Chris Sarandon, M.F.A., actor, best known for his portrayal of Prince Humperdinck in The Princess Bride
- Susan Sarandon, B.A. 1968, Academy Award-winning actress who played Janet in The Rocky Horror Picture Show
- John Slattery, B.F.A. 1984, actor
- Jon Voight, B.A. 1960, actor who won an Academy Award as best actor for Coming Home
- Lisa Ann Walter, played Chessy in the 1998 remake of The Parent Trap

==== Media ====
- Maureen B. Dowd, B.A. 1973, columnist for The New York Times
- Mary Alice Dwyer-Dobbin, M.F.A. 1967, CEO, Procter & Gamble Productions (producers of As the World Turns and Guiding Light)
- Julie Nixon Eisenhower, M.A. 1972, author
- Alfred Gough, B.A. 1989, executive producer of WB’s Smallville, co-wrote screenplay for Spider-Man 2
- Kathryn Jean Lopez, B.A. 1997, editor-at-large, National Review Online
- Kee Malesky, M.A. 1974, research librarian for NPR
- Scott P. Richert, M.A. 1992, publisher, Our Sunday Visitor
- Rosanna Scotto, B.F.A. 1980, co-anchor of FOX-5 News (New York)
- Dennis Wholey, B.A. 1959, host of This is America with Dennis Wholey
- Brian Williams, attended briefly but did not graduate, anchor, NBC Nightly News

==== Theatre ====
- John Aler, B.M. 1971, M.M. 1972, tenor, eight-time Grammy winner
- Harolyn M. Blackwell, B.M. 1977, M.M. 1980, soprano, Metropolitan Opera
- Walter Bobbie, dancer, choreographer, director and actor
- Philip Bosco, B.A. 1957, Tony Award-winning actor
- Fabiana Bravo, Argentine operatic soprano, Metropolitan Opera
- Mart Crowley, playwright
- Rose Hemingway, stage actress, How to Succeed In Business Without Really Trying on Broadway
- George Herman, M.F.A 1954, playwright
- Jean Kerr, M.F.A., Pulitzer-winning playwright and author
- Jason Miller, Pulitzer Prize-winning playwright (1973); starred as Father Damien Karras in the movie The Exorcist
- Donn B. Murphy, M.F.A. 1954, president of National Theatre Washington, DC; Distinguished Professor of Theatre, Georgetown University
- Michael Murray, B.A. 1954, co-founder and artistic director of Charles Playhouse (Boston); artistic director of Cincinnati Playhouse in the Park; chair of Department of Theatre Arts, Brandeis University
- Tracy Lynn Olivera, B.M. 1999, actress
- Joe Plummer, B.A. 1954, actor and playwright
- Gerome Ragni, musical writer and actor
- Frances Sternhagen, Broadway, film and television actress
- Paula Vogel, B.A. 1974, Pulitzer Prize-winning playwright

==== Other (arts) ====
- Mark Adamo, B.M. 1990, composer
- Yazmany Arboleda, School of Architecture and Planning, 2005, installation artist
- Antonella Barba, contestant on the 6th season of American Idol
- Aida Bonnelly de Diaz, pianist, writer and artistic director
- David C. Driskell, M.F.A. 1962, visual artist and curator
- Joseph Fitzmartin, composer, conductor and arranger
- Patricia Goslee, M.F.A., painter, curator
- Elizabeth Hand, B.A., author
- Maryann Karinch, B.A. 1974, M.A. 1979, author
- Peter Kwasniewski, writer
- Hank Levy, M.M., composer, notable for composition used in the 2014 film Whiplash
- Nick Lowe, comic book editor
- Paul Neebe, Ph.D., classical trumpeter
- Father Norman O'Connor (1921–2003), priest, jazz music aficionado, writer, radio and TV show host
- Marjorie Perloff, M.A. 1956, Ph.D. 1965, poetry scholar and critic
- Martin Puryear, B.A. 1963, sculptor and recipient of the MacArthur Fellowship
- Jim Self, M.M. 1972, classical tubist
- Don Shirley, composer and pianist, on whom the Oscar-winning movie Green Book was based
- John Vachon, photographer
- Marion Verhaalen, composer and musicologist
- Rolande Maxwell Young, composer

=== Business ===
- Alfonso Fanjul Sr. (1909–1980), Cuban sugar baron
- Nessa Feddis, J.D., lobbyist, vice president and senior counsel to the American Bankers Association
- Judith Kent, business executive and philanthropist
- Edward M. Liddy, B.A. 1968, CEO of American Insurance Group
- Tarek Saab, B.E.E. 2001, contestant on the 5th season of NBC's The Apprentice
- Joseph A. Unanue, B.M.E. 1950, CEO of Goya Foods

=== Education ===
- Sanford Berman, M.S. 1961, radical librarian
- Mary Daly, M.A., radical feminist theologian and advocate of parthenogenesis
- James W. Dean Jr., B.A., president of the University of New Hampshire
- Peter M. Donohue, O.S.A., M.A. 1983, president, Villanova University
- Brother Patrick Ellis, F.S.C., president, La Salle University
- Andrew Gonzalez, M.A., president of De La Salle University
- Euphemia Haynes, first African American woman to earn a Ph.D. in mathematics
- Mark A. Heckler, M.F.A 1979, president, Valparaiso University
- Theodore Hesburgh, CSC, S.T.D. 1945, president emeritus of the University of Notre Dame
- Joseph L. Levesque, S.T.D. 1977, president of Niagara University
- George M. Lightfoot, M.A. 1922, professor and former chair of classics at Howard University
- W. Wesley McDonald, author of Russell Kirk and the Age of Ideology
- Jesse Mann, Ph.D. 1958, professor emeritus of philosophy at Georgetown University
- Richard Brian Miller, M.A. 1982, Laura Spelman Rockefeller Emeritus Professor of Religion, Politics, and Ethics at University of Chicago
- Kenneth Ozmon, M.A. 1963, president of Mount Allison University
- Judith C. Russell, M.L.S., dean of the University of Florida Library System
- Charles C. Tansill (1890–1964), professor of history
- Gary Vena, M.A., professor emeritus of English and drama at Manhattan University
- Spiro Zavos, M.A. 1967, Australasian historian, journalist and writer

=== Civil law ===
- Kathleen Abernathy, J.D. 1983, commissioner of the Federal Communications Commission
- Alice Pollard Clark, 1963, first African-American woman to serve as district judge for Howard County, Maryland
- Alice S. Fisher, J.D. assistant attorney general and head, United States Department of Justice Criminal Division
- Arthur J. Gajarsa, M.A. 1964, circuit judge on the United States Court of Appeals for the Federal Circuit
- Colleen Kollar-Kotelly, B.A. 1965, J.D. 1968, judge, United States District Court for the District of Columbia and presiding judge of the Foreign Intelligence Surveillance Court
- Joseph F. Leeson, Jr., J.D. 1980, judge, United States District Court for the Eastern District of Pennsylvania
- John T. Noonan, Jr., M.A. 1948, Ph.D. 1951, senior judge on the United States Court of Appeals for the Ninth Circuit
- Peggy Quince, J.D. 1975, chief justice of the Florida Supreme Court and first African-American woman to sit on that bench

=== Canon law ===
- David P. Long, J.C.D. 2022, dean of the Catholic University of America School of Professional Studies
- Edward N. Peters, J.C.D. 1991, referendary of the Supreme Tribunal of the Apostolic Signatura

=== Science and engineering ===
- Nelly Garzón Alarcón (1932–2019), Colombian nurse, teacher
- Norman L. Crabill, BAE, 1949, developed patents for rocket vehicle control system and automated weather systems for pilots
- Hugh Everett, 1953, physicist who first proposed the many-worlds interpretation of quantum physics
- Harold P. Freeman, MD, cancer researcher
- Michael D. Griffin, NASA administrator
- Virginia Griffing, PhD (1947), physicist and chemist, first woman on the faculty of Catholic University of America's physics department
- Marie Inez Hilger (1891–1977), Benedictine nun and anthropologist
- Charles Kaman, B.A. 1940, aviation pioneer and founder of Kaman Aircraft
- Daniel R. Mulville, Ph.D. structural engineering 1974, NASA's chief engineer and acting administrator of NASA in 2001
- Nancy H. Nielsen, Ph.D. 1969, in microbiology, elected to National Academy of Medicine
- Rev. Julius Nieuwland, C.S.C., Ph.D. 1904, discoverer of synthetic rubber
- Anne Phoya (graduated 1993), midwife leader in Malawi
- Joseph Weber, Ph.D. 1951, developed the first gravitational wave detectors and first suggested the use of laser interferometry in the field
- Marguerite Thomas Williams, Ph.D. 1942, first African American to earn a Ph.D. in geology

=== Athletics ===
- Bill Adamaitis, player for the Washington Redskins
- Michael Bidwill, principal owner, chairman, and president of the Arizona Cardinals
- Brian Cashman, B.A. 1989, senior vice president and general manager, New York Yankees
- Tim Connelly, B.A. 1999, general manager of the Minnesota Timberwolves of the National Basketball Association
- Frank Coonelly, J.D., president of the Pittsburgh Pirates
- Dan Freeman, B.A. 2011, head coach, Albertus Magnus Baseball
- Bryson Fonville, B.A. 2016, player for the Texas Legends
- Marty Hurney, B.A. 1978, American football administrator and executive
- Bill Lajousky, NFL player
- Mike Lonergan, B.A. 1988, head men's basketball coach, George Washington University
- Jimmy Patsos, B.A. 1989, men's basketball head coach, Siena College
- Wally Pipp, A.B. 1914, first baseman, New York Yankees

=== Other ===
- Carl Amery, German writer
- Thomas Berry, Ph.D., cultural historian and ecotheologian
- Thea Bowman, Catholic nun, teacher and scholar
- Francis P. Duffy, Ph.D., military chaplain, war hero, and namesake of Time Square's Duffy Square
- Jackie Ducci, author
- Patrick Fahey, OSA, prior provincial of the Australian Province of the Order of St Augustine
- Daveed Gartenstein-Ross, Ph.D., security analyst
- Greg Johnson, Ph.D. 2001, white nationalist, co-founder and editor-in-chief of the imprint Counter-Currents Publishing
- Charles Kekumano, Ph.D.
- Robert McCulloch, missionary in Pakistan for 33 years
- Nicholas Perry, B.M., internet celebrity and YouTuber
- John T. Tozzi, Ph.D., U.S. Coast Guard rear admiral
- Miguel Vila Luna, Dominican artist and architect; designed a National Heritage building
- Kevin Walling, American political commentator

== Faculty ==
- Gerda Blumenthal, literary scholar, taught French and comparative literature
- Clyde Cowan, co-discoverer of the neutrino
- Risteard De Hindeberg, Irish language scholar
- Cardinal Avery Dulles, taught theology 1974–1988
- Chorbishop John D. Faris, Maronite canon lawyer
- Msgr. Joseph Clifford Fenton, peritus to Cardinal Alfredo Ottaviani at the Second Vatican Council
- Regina Flannery Herzfeld, first laywoman on CUA faculty; first woman department head at CUA (anthropology)
- Father Gilbert Hartke, O.P.
- Michael Hendricks, psychologist, suicidologist, and advocate for the LGBT community
- Karl Herzfeld, physics
- Theo Holm, botanist
- Oleg Kalugin, former KGB spy
- Walter Kerr, dramatist and theater critic
- Frederick Joseph Kinsman, ecclesiastical historian
- Douglas Kmiec, legal counsel to President Ronald Reagan; United States Ambassador to Malta; faith advisor to President Barack Obama; served as dean and St. Thomas More Professor, Columbus School of Law
- Theodore Litovitz, physicist and inventor
- Kurt Martens, canon lawyer
- Wayne Millner (1913–1976), American football player
- James Kerby Neill (1906–1996), professor emeritus of English, author and researcher
- Venigalla Rao, professor of biology
- Venerable Archbishop Fulton J. Sheen, JCB, 1920, auxiliary bishop of New York and Bishop of Rochester, host of Life is Worth Living, faculty 1926–1950 in theology and philosophy
- George P. Smith II, bioethics scholar, prolific writer
- Monsignor Robert Sokolowski, philosopher
- Cardinal Luis Antonio Tagle, archbishop of the Roman Catholic Archdiocese of Manila
- Monsignor John F. Wippel, Thomas Aquinas scholar
