= List of people from Arlington, Virginia =

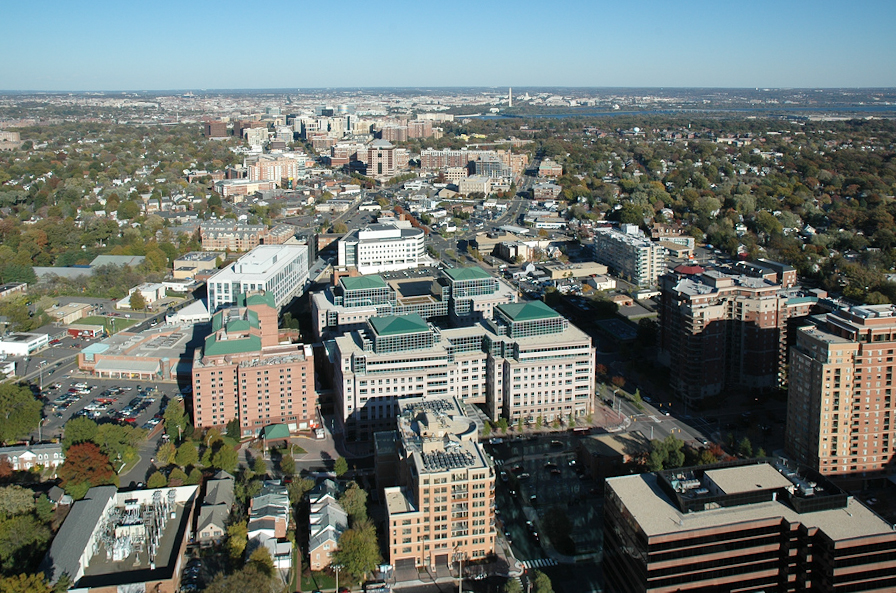
Arlington County, Virginia

The following is a list of notable individuals who live or have lived in Arlington County, Virginia.

== Academia ==
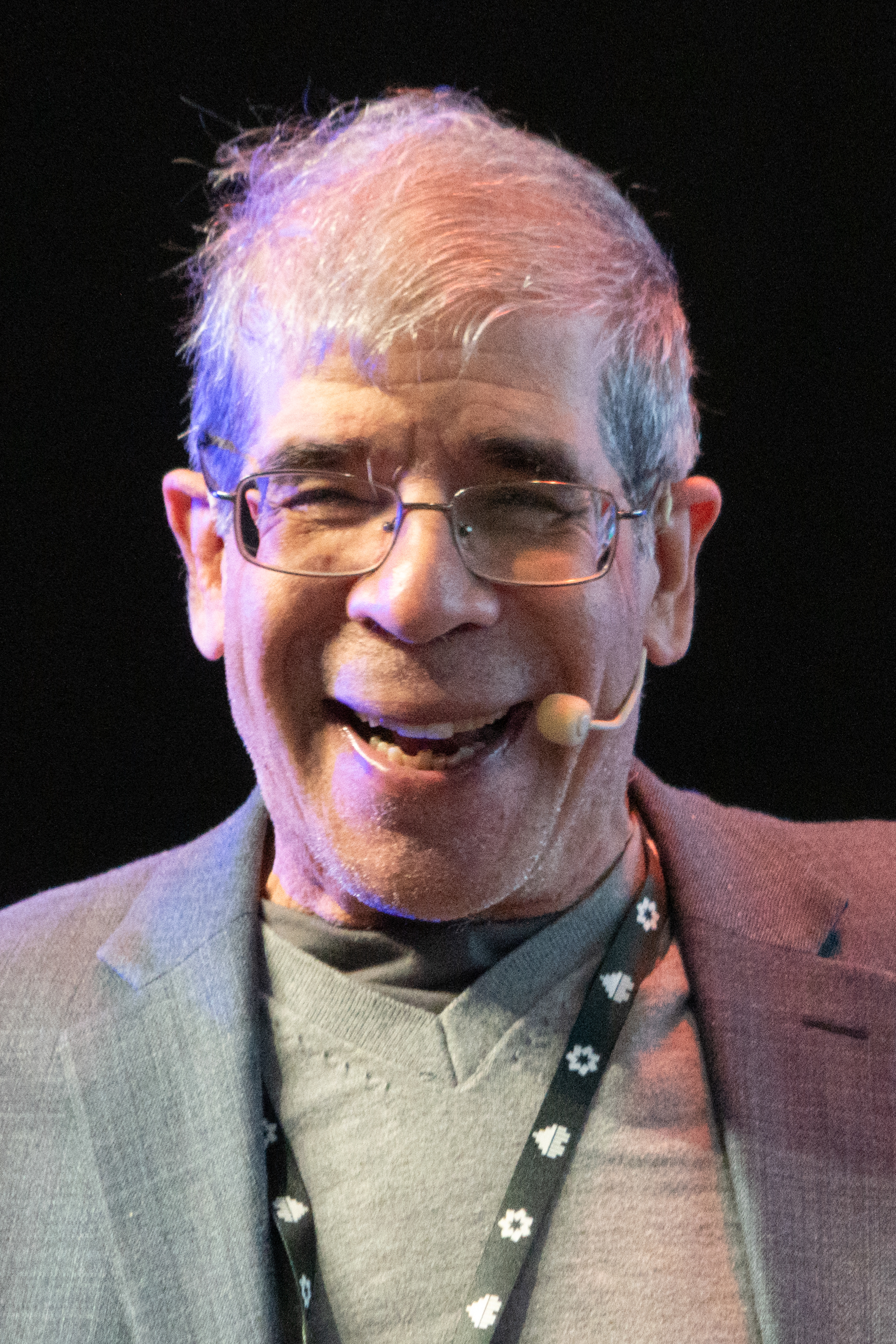
Biologist Jerry Coyne

- Jerry Coyne, biologist, University of Chicago
- Harry Lee Morrison, former physicist, University of California, Berkeley

== Arts and entertainment ==
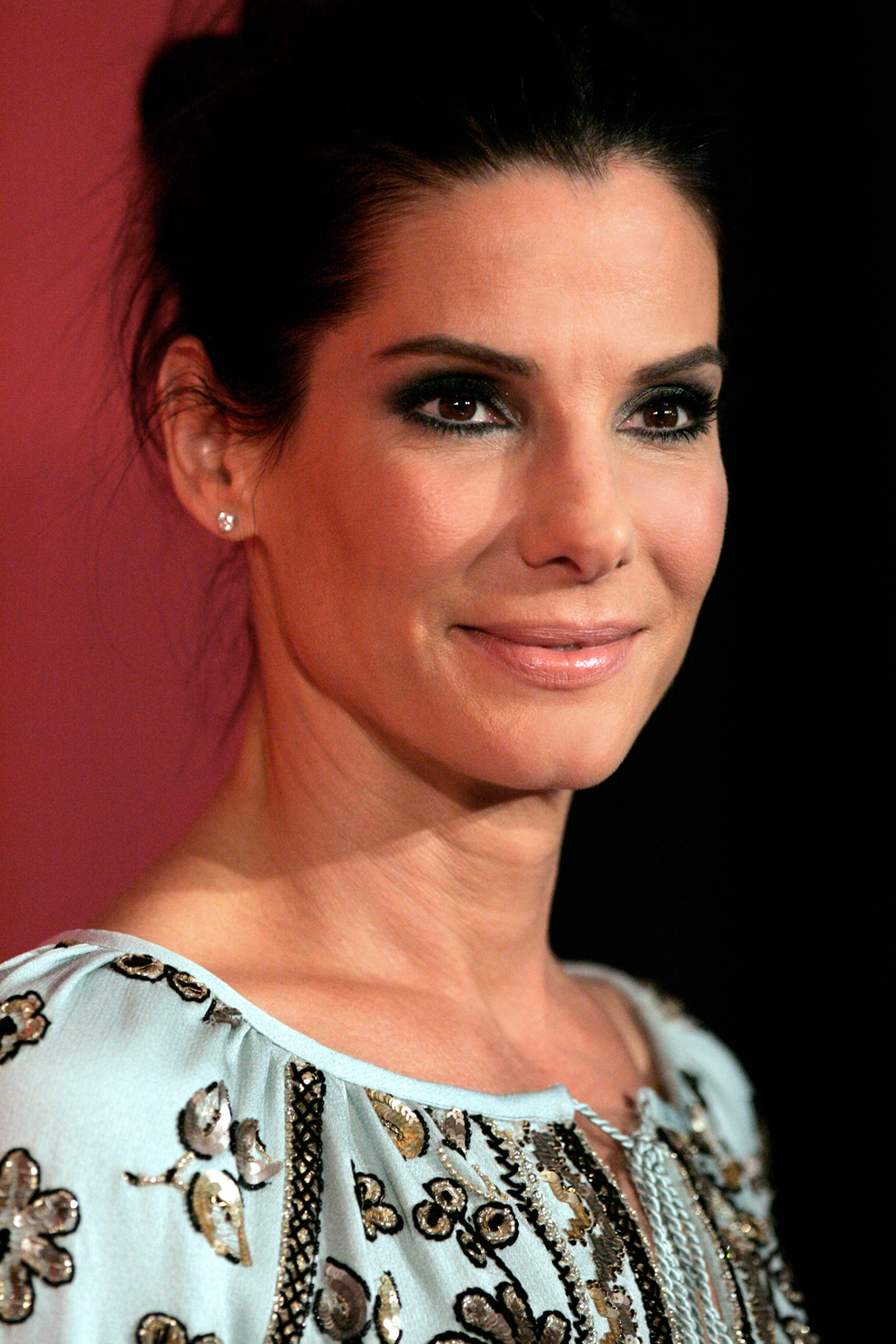
Academy Award-winning actress Sandra Bullock

- Danny Ahn, musician, g.o.d
- Iain Armitage, actor
- Dave Bautista, actor and former professional wrestler
- Warren Beatty, actor and director
- Gordon Bess, cartoonist
- Steve Buckhantz, sports announcer, Washington Wizards
- Sandra Bullock, Academy Award-winning actress
- Alyson Cambridge, classical music, jazz, and popular song singer
- Zach Cregger, director
- George Washington Parke Custis, orator and playwright; stepgrandson and informally adopted son of President George Washington
- Roberta Flack, jazz, soul, R&B, folk music singer, songwriter, and musician
- Greg Garcia, television writer, producer and director
- Zac Hanson, musician
- Julia Kwon, visual artist
- Shirley MacLaine, actress
- Jim Morrison, rock musician, song writer, and lead vocalist, The Doors
- DeStorm Power, Internet personality
- Natalie Wynn, YouTube personality

== Astronauts ==
- David M. Brown, astronaut who died in the Space Shuttle Columbia disaster
- John Glenn, former U.S. senator and NASA astronaut

== Business ==
- Frank Lyon, lawyer, newspaper publisher and land developer
- Jeremy Stoppelman, CEO and co-founder of Yelp

== Civil rights ==
- Esther Cooper Jackson, African-American civil rights activist and social worker
- Joan Trumpauer Mulholland, activist known for helping plan the March on Washington for Jobs and Freedom and taking part in Freedom Rides

== Crime ==
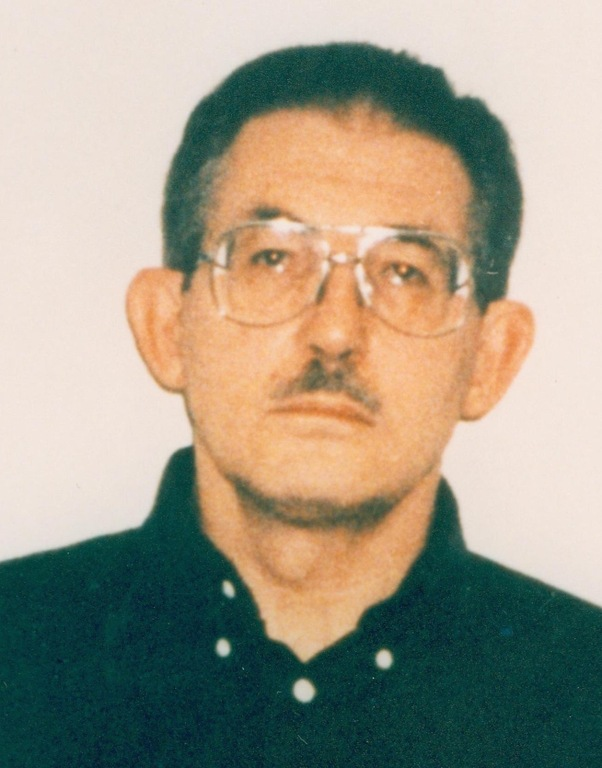
CIA agent and Soviet spy Aldrich Ames

- Aldrich Ames, Central Intelligence Agency agent convicted of espionage on behalf of the Soviet Union
- Nidal Hasan, sole suspect in the November 5, 2009, Fort Hood shooting
- Mikhail Kutzik and Natalia Pereverzeva, accused spies

== Journalism ==
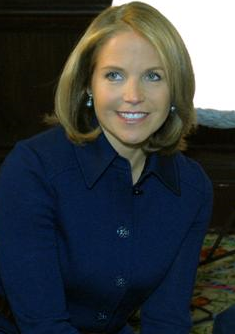
Television journalist Katie Couric

- Katie Couric, television journalist and talk show host

== Medicine ==
- Patch Adams, physician
- Charles R. Drew, physician, most prominent African-American researcher in the field of blood transfusions in the 1940s; namesake of Drew School in San Francisco

== Military ==
- George M. Browning Jr., United States Air Force lieutenant general
- Holmes E. Dager, U.S. Army major general, lived in Arlington during his retirement
- Grace Hopper, pioneering computer scientist, and United States Navy rear admiral
- George Juskalian, decorated member of the United States Army; served for over three decades; fought for three wars, including World War II, Korean War and Vietnam War
- Robert E. Lee, Confederate Army general who lived at Arlington House
- George S. Patton, Jr., U.S. Army general during World War II
- Blake Wayne Van Leer, commander and captain, United States Navy, led the nuclear research and power unit at McMurdo Station during Operation Deep Freeze

== Politics and government ==
- W. Sterling Cole, former U.S. congressman
- Al Gore, former vice president
- Betty Heitman, co-chairman of the Republican National Committee, 1983–1987; ran the Heitman Group consulting firm in Washington, D.C.; resided in Arlington
- Mary Landrieu, former U.S. senator; raised in Louisiana
- Ilhan Omar, U.S. representative for Minnesota
- Ajit Pai, chairman of the Federal Communications Commission
- James Walkinshaw, U.S. representative for Virginia

== Sports ==
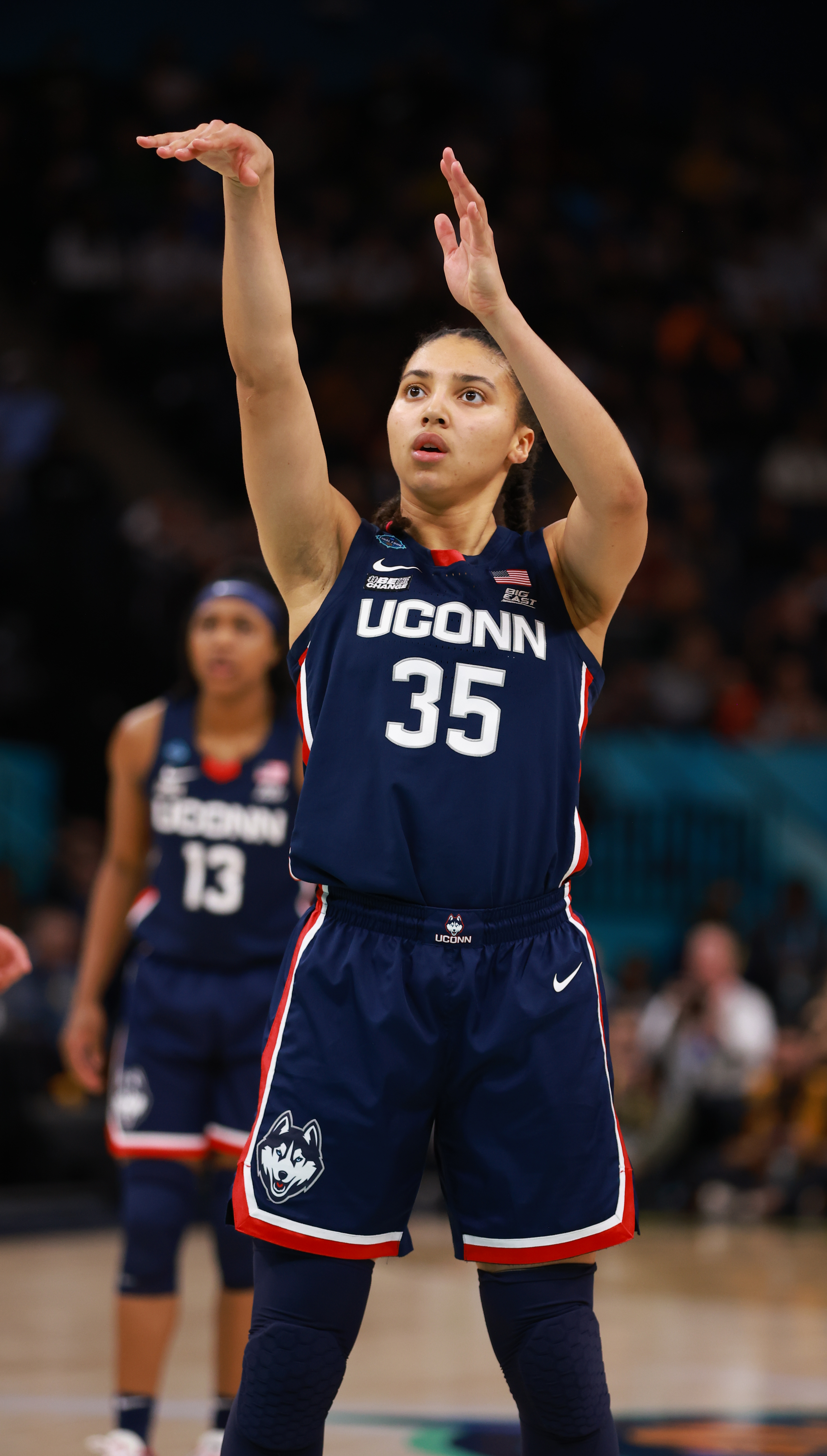
Uconn Huskies Women's Basketball player Azzi Fudd

- Nataly Arias, Colombian association footballer
- Gboly Ariyibi, soccer player
- Connor Barth, former professional professional football player
- Paul Beachem, Olympic paddler, 1960 and 1968
- Michael Callahan, U.S. National Team and Olympic rower (spare-2004)
- Bruce Djite, American-Australian soccer player
- Tom Dolan, Olympic swimmer
- Azzi Fudd, college basketball player, UConn Huskies
- Ryan Hall, mixed martial arts, UFC featherweight
- Sean Hall, Olympic rower, 1992 and 1996
- DeShawn Harris-Smith, college basketball player, Maryland Terrapins
- John Hummer, former professional basketball player and entrepreneur
- Torri Huske, Olympic swimmer, 2020
- Tony Johnson, Olympic rower, 1948 and 1968 silver medalist
- M. J. Stewart, former professional football player, Cleveland Browns, Houston Texans, and Tampa Bay Buccaneers

== Other ==
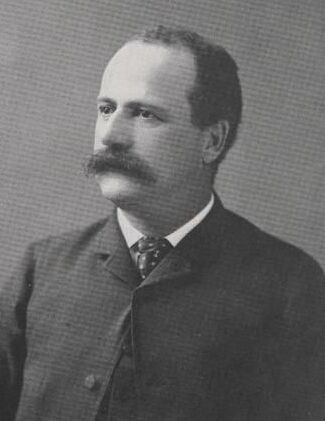
Robert E. Lee Jr.

- David Chang, chef
- Anne Carter Lee, daughter of Robert E. Lee
- Mary Custis Lee, daughter of Robert E. Lee
- Mildred Childe Lee, daughter of Robert E. Lee
- Robert E. Lee Jr., son of Robert E. Lee
- William Henry Fitzhugh Lee, son of Robert E. Lee
