= Yasmani =

Yasmani (also Yasmany or Yazmany) is a masculine given name that may refer to:

- Yasmani Acosta, Chilean wrestler
- Yazmany Arboleda, Colombian American artist
- Yasmani Copello (born 1987), Cuban-Turkish hurdler
- Yasmani Duk (born 1988), Bolivian footballer
- Yasmani Grandal (born 1988), Cuban-American baseball player
- Yasmany Lopez, Cuban footballer
- Yasmany Lugo, Cuban wrestler
- Yasmani Romero (born 1988), Cuban Olympic weightlifter
- Yasmany Tomás (born 1990), Cuban baseball player
