= Neasa =

Neasa is an Irish feminine given name. It may refer to the following notable people:

- Neasa Dooley (born 2000), Irish Australian rules footballer
- Neasa Flynn (born 2001), Australian field hockey player
- Neasa Hardiman, Irish TV director
- Neasa Hourigan (born 1980), Irish politician
- Neasa Ní Annracháin (1922–2014), Irish actress
- Neasa Ní Chianáin, Irish documentary filmmaker

== See also ==
- Nessa (given name)
