= Harry Lee Morrison =

American theoretical physicist

- Born: October 7, 1932; Arlington County, Virginia, U.S.
- Died: 14 January 2002 (aged 69); Berkeley, California, U.S.
- Education: Catholic University of America
- Scientific career
- Workplaces: University of California, Berkeley
- Thesis: Theoretical Investigation of Linear H3 (1960)
- Doctoral advisor: Virginia Griffing
- Notable students: Jennie Patrick

Harry Lee Morrison (October 7, 1932 – January 14, 2002) was an American theoretical physicist and the first African American physics faculty member at the University of California, Berkeley. His research focused on statistical mechanics within theoretical physics, and he was known for his demonstration in 1972 of the absence of long-range order in quantum systems in two dimensions, that was a result from the breaking of a continuous symmetry.

Morrison was also a founding member of the National Society of Black Physicists.

== Early life and education ==
Harry L. Morrison was born on October 7, 1932, in Arlington, Virginia. As a child, he attended primary school in divisions 10-13 in Washington, D.C., as the Virginia public school system was segregated.

In 1955, he received his bachelor's degree in chemistry from Catholic University of America in Washington, D.C., which was one a limited number of integrated universities in the area at the time. The year he received his bachelor's degree, Rutherford T. Atkins became the first African American person to receive a PhD from the university. Subsequently, he earned his doctorate in chemistry at Catholic University of America in 1960. At Catholic, he studied under Karl Herzfield, Clyde Cowan, and Theodore Litovitz. His thesis was titled "Theoretical Investigation of Linear H3" and his doctoral advisor was Virginia Griffing. His thesis research was supported in part by the U.S. Air Force and the Air Force Office of Scientific Research.

During his time as a student, he was a member of Sigma Xi and participated in sessions of the Summer Institute for Theoretical Physics at the University of Colorado, Boulder.

== Career ==
After receiving his PhD, Morrison completed a one-year National Research Council postdoctoral fellowship at the National Bureau of Standards. There, he worked in the Statistical Physics Division which was then led by Melville S. Green.

He then went on to join the U.S. Air Force Academy as a 1st Lieutenant in 1961, and taught at the academy as an assistant professor of physics until 1964. That year, he was honorably discharged from service, with the rank of Captain and the Commendation Medal Citation. In 1964, he began as a staff member at the Lawrence Livermore National Laboratory, working as a theoretical physicist.

In 1972, Morrison joined the faculty of the physics department at the University of California, Berkeley, as an assistant professor. In 1977, he became full professor at UC Berkeley, where he would work for the remainder of his career. He was part of the early founding of the statewide academic preparation program Mathematics, Engineering, Science Achievement (MESA), launched in 1970, which focused on increasing enrollment of minority students.

While at UC Berkeley, Morrison supported the creation of the university's Black Studies program. Along with Robert Henry Bragg Jr., as members of the program's Policy Review Board, he taught a survey course titled "The African American Experience in Science and Technology" covering the physical and biological sciences and engineering, and featuring expert speakers to address the role of African Americans in these fields of study.

In 1985, Morrison became assistant dean in the undergraduate advising office of the College of Letters and Science. In 1994, Morrison retired from his professorial position but remained in his position as assistant dean until his death. During this time, he was a member of the UCB Special Scholarships Committee, part of the Academic Senate Committee and the university's Professional Development Program (led by Philip Treisman). At UC Berkeley, he was also a longtime member of the physics department's library committee.

Over his career, he was a member of numerous professional organizations, including the American Physical Society, where he was a 1971 fellow. He served on the APS executive committee from 1971 to 1975, and was also a founding member of its Committee on Minorities, which he also chaired in 1977. He was also a member of the National Organization of Black Chemists and Chemical Engineers; the American Mathematical Society; and the International Association of Mathematical Physics.

He also held appointments as a visiting professor at Hampton University, Howard University, Massachusetts Institute of Technology, and the University of Colorado. He also was professionally involved in mathematics research in addition to his physics work, and in 1997 participated in the 3rd Conference for African-American Researchers in the Mathematical Sciences at Morgan State University.

=== Research ===
Morrison's research work centered on statistical mechanics within theoretical physics, the many-body problem, and the relationship between microscopic and macroscopic physics. In collaboration with John Garrison and Jack Wong, Morrison made a significant contribution in 1972 by demonstrating "the absence of long-range order in quantum systems in two dimensions, such as in thin superfluid helium films, due to the breaking of a continuous symmetry." He also worked on the application of "current algebra" to the geometry of macroscopic quantum flows in superfluid helium.

=== National Society of Black Physicists ===
Morrison was a founding member of the National Society of Black Physicists and one of its first fellows. While on leave from the University of California, Berkeley and teaching at Howard University, Morrison served as a member of the Awards Committee and gave remarks at the first meeting of what would become the NSBP in December 1972. This first meeting honored physicists Halson V. Eagleson, John McNeile Hunter, and Donald A. Edwards. In 1976, following a meeting at Morgan State University, Morrison was part of a group that contributed to the initial plans for the formal NSBP (then called the Society of Black Physicists).

== Death ==
Morrison died on January 14, 2002, from a heart attack at his home in Berkeley, California.

== Legacy ==
The Harry L. Morrison Scholarship issued at the National Society of Black Physicists was named for Morrison.

== Personal life ==
Morrison was married to Harriett Morrison, and they had one daughter.
