= Nessa (given name) =

Nessa is a short version of Vanessa and a feminine given name. It may refer to the following notable people:

- Nessa Barrett (born 2002), American singer and songwriter
- Nessa Carey, British biologist
- Nessa Childers (born 1956), Irish politician
- Nessa Cohen (1885–1976), American sculptor born Helen Nessa Cohen
- Nessa Cosgrove, Irish politician
- Nessa Feddis (born 1958), American attorney and banking industry spokesperson
- Nessa Hyams (1941–2026), American casting director
- Nessa Morgan, 21st century New Zealand-born Australian R&B singer
- Nessa Ní Shéaghdha (1916–1993), Irish Celtic Studies scholar
- Nessa O'Mahony, Irish poet and writer
- Nessa Robins, Irish food writer, blogger and photographer
