= Jennie Patrick =

American chemical engineer and educator

- Born: January 1, 1949 (age 77); Gadsden, Alabama, U.S.
- Education: Tuskegee University University of California at Berkeley Massachusetts Institute of Technology
- Known for: First African American woman to earn a doctorate in traditional chemical engineering
- Scientific career
- Fields: Chemical engineering
- Workplaces: Tuskegee University
- Thesis: Superheat-Limit Temperature for Non-ideal Liquid Mixtures and Pure Components (1979)

Jennie Patrick (born 1949) is an American chemical engineer and educator. As a high school student, she participated in the integration of Alabama's public schools. At Massachusetts Institute of Technology in 1979, she became one of the first African American women in the United States to earn a doctorate in traditional chemical engineering. She went on to pioneer work on supercritical fluid extraction. Her educational work has focused on the mentoring of African American and female students.

== Childhood ==
Jennie Patrick was born on January 1, 1949, to James and Elizabeth Patrick of Gadsden, Alabama, which she later described as "quite rural, very slow, just a typical southern town". She was the fourth of five children. Her father was a laborer, and her mother worked as a housekeeper. Neither had more than a sixth-grade education, but they believed that education was the way out of poverty and encouraged all their children to pursue formal education. They bought two sets of encyclopedias for their children, which Patrick read, along with books from the local public library.

Patrick describes herself as a very curious child. In an interview with Jeanette E. Brown, she explained: "[I] just wanted to understand why things were, and how things operated. Living in a rural setting allowed me to be very close to nature. The wonders of nature seemed to have fueled my desire even more so, to understand why things happened in a certain way."

Patrick's elementary and middle schools were segregated, but supportive. She was curious about how things worked and was very imaginative. She recalls that her fifth grade teacher, Mr. Anthony Knowledges, taught her math at a much higher level than her peers, and credits her sixth grade teacher, Mrs Pinkie Bridges, as an inspiration to "achieve anything I wanted".

In 1964, Patrick was one of a group of African American students who integrated the best public school in the city, Gadsden City High School after the Brown v. Board of Education ruling. Patrick knew that she wanted to be a chemist by junior high school, so she was the first Black student to sign up for Gadsden High, which had the scientific equipment Patrick needed for scientific studies, unavailable in the local black schools. In an interview with Jeannette E. Brown, she explained: "I went to the school with one notion, and that was to get the best education I could possibly get."

While at Gadsden, Patrick experienced discrimination and abuse from both students and teachers, as well as protesters against integration. Some of her peers were beaten to the point of hospitalization. She said of her experiences, "The initial months were a living nightmare. The emotional, psychological, mental, and physical violence against us was difficult to comprehend." Her parents were supportive, though the families of Black students who enrolled in integrated schools had been threatened by the Ku Klux Klan. Of the eleven black students with whom she entered Gadsden, half left the school before graduation, and Patrick had to challenge the staff to be considered for college preparatory classes, the most difficult courses the school offered. She told Jeanette E. Brown: "I've always had the mental and emotional strength to be focused. And so, it was irrelevant to me whether or not they wanted me there or not. (...) I was more than willing to physically protect myself". Patrick graduated with honors in 1967. She was not allowed to join the National Honor Society because she was African American.

== Education ==
Patrick was offered a scholarship to the University of California at Berkeley, her dream school. However, on her mother's wishes, Patrick initially studied closer to home, earning a scholarship at Tuskegee University (then called the Tuskegee Institute) in Alabama. There she majored in a short-lived program in chemical engineering. Though the Tuskegee Institute was a traditionally Black school, the head of the chemical engineering department was a white southern man, who was opposed to Patrick majoring in chemical engineering, and was 'nasty' with her. When that program collapsed, she transferred to Berkeley, but was no longer eligible for a scholarship. She worked for a year to pay her way through Berkeley, but even so had barely enough money to live on. She worked every summer, first as an assistant engineer at Dow, then at Stauffer Chemical Company. On the recommendation of Dr. Harry L. Morrison, one of her teachers, she was given a grant to pursue her studies. She graduated in 1973 with a B.Sc. in chemical engineering, the only African American female undergraduate and the first African American chemical engineering student at Berkeley in ten years. During her time at Berkeley, other students and faculty felt and expressed that she did not belong there, and even destroyed her work. She recalls a particular professor who would "spit on the floor in front of [her]" every time he entered the classroom, and purposefully tried to throw her off by leaning over her to stare at her during an exam. Patrick credits her experiences at Berkeley with helping her to develop mental toughness and independence.

She went on to the Massachusetts Institute of Technology (MIT), to pursue a PhD (Sc.D.) in chemical engineering. Though she did not need a PhD to be an engineer, she "always wanted the highest education possible", and "felt like [she] would not have completed the process without doing so." MIT was one of the best schools in the United States for engineering studies. She also found MIT a more positive environment for black students in science and engineering; though the proportion of African American students at MIT was small, it was still higher than at other colleges in the country. Patrick enjoyed the tough and challenging atmosphere, and was a very dedicated student, working seven days a week. She studied thermodynamics, homogeneous nucleation, heat and mass transfer, and worked as a research assistant. Her advisor was Robert C. Reid, a world-renowned thermodynamicist, and her thesis topic dealt with nucleation phenomena. She graduated in 1979 with her Sc.D. in chemical engineering, the first African American woman to earn a doctorate in chemical engineering. The title of her dissertation was "Superheat-Limit Temperature for Non-ideal Liquid Mixtures and Pure Components". In it she examined superheating, in which a liquid is raised above its boiling temperature without becoming a vapor. She studied the temperature to which pure liquids and mixtures of liquids could be superheated.

== Work ==
After graduation, Patrick joined the General Electric Research Laboratory in Schenectady, New York, where she worked as a research engineer for three and a half years. She helped develop a program in supercritical fluid extraction technology, a high pressure separation and purification technology, becoming one of the few experts in the field in the country.

She went on to head a new, state-of-the-art supercritical fluid extraction technology program and design a pilot plant at Philip Morris Research Center in Richmond, Virginia. There, she used the technology to extract the flavors and essence from tobacco.

In 1985, she became Manager of Fundamental Chemical Engineering Research at Rohm and Haas in Bristol, Pennsylvania, where in addition to her work on supercritical fluid extraction, she was involved in polymer science and emulsion technology research. She worked as a research section manager for five years, with both technical and managerial responsibilities Talking about her role at Rohm and Haas, she explained: "we really [were] the brain power for making sure that their plants ran well, making sure that we developed new technology in terms of process technologies for their facilities."

In 1990, she was made assistant to the vice president at Southern Company Services in Birmingham, Alabama, a position she held for three years

During this time, Patrick also served as an adjunct professor at Rensselaer Polytechnic Institute (1982–1985) and at Georgia Institute of Technology (1983–1987).

In 1993, she moved from industry to academia, returning to Tuskegee Institute as a professor of chemical engineering, and as the first scientist to occupy the 3M Eminent Scholar's Chair at Tuskegee University. From 1993-1997 she was active both in research and in helping minority students interested in science and engineering. At Tuskegee, she developed a mentoring program for girls in science. She taught students strategies for survival in hostile environments. She lived in a dorm with honor students she had individually selected to mentor, "to give them exposure to someone mature". She explained: "Being here (at Tuskegee) provides me the opportunity to make a difference in the lives of students. I've been able to teach them and share many of my experiences with them – thus providing them hopefully with some insight into what the future may hold for them."

She left Tuskegee University in 1997, worked for three years as a technical consultant at Raytheon Engineers and Constructors in Birmingham, Alabama, and studied the education of urban children.

Patrick does not have many publications to show for her career, a fact she attributes to her career in industry, and the politics involved: "depending on who you are, even though your idea may be revolutionary, they may choose to take that idea, and shelve it. (...) They [can] take the decision never to give you recognition for that work."

During her career in the chemical industry, Patrick was exposed to many chemicals, which affected her health. In an interview with Jeanette E. Brown, she explained: "I became chemically ill by being exposed repeatedly in the chemical industry to extremely toxic chemicals that destroyed my immune system and destroyed the normal functions of my body". Since her retirement in 2000, Patrick has worked to establish the Environmental Wellness Institute to educate the public on environmental dangers. She founded Education and Environmental solutions in Peachtree City, Georgia, and still consults for them.

== Awards ==
Patrick received the Outstanding Women in Science and Engineering Award from the National Organization for the Professional Advancement of Black Chemists and Chemical Engineers (NOBCChE) in 1980. She is a member of the American Institute of Chemical Engineers, Sigma Xi, and NOBCChE.

In 1983, Patrick served as Principle in the Ciba-Geigy Exceptional Black Scientists Poster Program.

She was granted an Honorary Doctor of Science from Tuskegee University in 1984. That same year she received a Candace Award from the National Coalition of 100 Black Women.

She was awarded the Presidential Citation from the National Association for Equal Opportunity in Higher Education in 1987, and made it into the World's Who's Who of Women in 1989.

She was presented with the William W. Grimes Award from the American Institute of Chemical Engineers in 2000, and the Black Achievers in Chemical Engineering Award of the American Institute of Chemical Engineers in 2008.

== Personal life ==
During her career, Patrick found it very difficult to balance her work and her personal life and family, explaining: "I've always valued my family more than anything else, so if something had to be put on a back burner momentarily, it was my career or the work situation." One of the reasons Patrick moved back to Birmingham, Alabama, was to take care of her elderly parents.

Patrick married a physician and former practicing chemical engineer, whom she describes as her "very best friend" and "just a wonderful human being". Since her retirement, she enjoys gardening, her 'quiet time' to commune with nature.

To young scientists, she advises: "You need to know who you are, you need to be comfortable with yourself, you need to love yourself, and you need to respect yourself. Then everything else becomes secondary. Achieve the highest goals possible but don't allow achievements alone to define who you are. Make the decision early. Don't let material things or world recognition be your driving force."
