= Michael Callahan (rowing) =

American rowing coach

Current position
- Title: Men's head coach
- Team: Washington

Biographical details
- Education: University of Washington; History (1996)

Coaching career (HC unless noted)
- 2001–: Washington (intern)
- 2004–2007: Washington (freshman)
- 2007–present: Washington

Accomplishments and honors

Awards
- Pacific-10 All-conference (1996); 12x Pac-10/12 Coach of the Year (2008, 2010–2015, 2017-19, 2021, 2024); USRowing Man of Year (2013)

Michael Callahan is the men's rowing head coach at the University of Washington.

== Early life ==
Callahan grew up in six states, including Washington while his father was stationed at Naval Submarine Base Bangor as a U.S. Navy Submarine Captain. He won a gold medal at the 1992 World Rowing Championships in Montreal while competing in the Junior Men's Eight.

== College and later rowing ==
Callahan attended the University of Washington where he earned a degree in history. While at Washington, Callahan won four Pacific-10 championships, earned the Ky-Ebright trophy in the Men's Varsity Eight three times, and was both captain and commodore of the 1996 team. In 1995 and 1996 his crews won a bronze and silver medal in the Men's Varsity Eight at IRA National Championships. In 1996, he was named Pacific-10 All-Conference.

Between 1997 and 2002, he stroked three U.S. National Team boats at the World Championships. Callahan was a medalist at the 1999 Pan American Games and 2000 World Rowing Cup, and a member of the 2004 U.S. Olympic Rowing Team.

== Coaching ==
In 2001, Callahan accepted a coaching internship at Washington under his former coach, Bob Ernst. After the 2004 Olympic Games, Callahan became the UW freshman coach. He was named the men's head coach prior to the 2007–2008 season, taking over for Ernst who became the women's coach.

Callahan has been named the Pac-12 Coach of the Year 10 times (2008, 2010, 2011, 2012, 2013, 2014, 2015, 2017, 2018, 2019) and has led the Huskies to Intercollegiate Rowing Association varsity eight national championships six times (2009, 2011, 2012, 2013, 2014, 2015), including an unprecedented five consecutive seasons from 2011 to 2015. Under Callahan, the UW men have won the James Ten Eyck Memorial Trophy (for overall points leader at IRAs) in 12 of his 13 seasons, including the last eight of a nine-year streak (2007–15) by Washington, also unprecedented in the history of the IRA Regatta.

Callahan was named Man of Year in 2013 by USRowing.

He led a United States Under-23 men's boats in 2005, 2006, 2007, 2008 (gold), 2011, 2012 (silver), 2017 (bronze), 2018 (gold).

At the senior level, Callahan coached the U.S. pair of Charlie Cole and Glenn Ochal to the A Final at the 2014 Senior World Championships in Amsterdam (marking the United States’ first appearance in the 2-A Final since 2009.)

During Callahan's tenure, Washington has also sent six boats to the prestigious Henley Royal Regatta in England. At Henley, the Huskies won the Temple Challenge Cup (2010, 2012, 2018), Prince Albert Cup (2015) and in 2013 the Varsity 8+ earned world-wide recognition by making it to the final of the Grand Challenge Cup, where the crew would have set a course record had they not been narrowly beaten by World Champion Great Britain crew. In 2024, UW's IRA-champion varsity eight competed in the Grand Challenge Cup at Henley, falling in the final.

Also in 2024, Callahan served as head coach of the United States' men's eight that competed at the 2024 Olympic Games in Paris. That crew qualified for the Olympics by winning the Final Olympic Qualification Regatta in Lucerne in May, 2024. At the Olympics later that summer, the U.S. men's eight won its heat to advance directly to the A final. In the A final, the U.S. won the bronze medal, finishing behind Great Britain (gold) and the Netherlands (silver).

Following the 2024 Olympic Games, where a total of 11 UW men's and women's rowing alumni earned medals, Callahan was awarded with the Order of Ikkos by the U.S. Olympic Committee.

== Personal life ==
Callahan and his wife, Joanna, are the parents of two daughters, Ellison and Maja. Joanna was a four-year varsity letter winner for Yale Women's Crew and earned a master's degree at the London School of Economic before graduating from law school at the University of Washington. Joanna's mother, Andy, was a co-captain of the UW track team while father, Mike Hess, was twice UW crew Captain and a member of the UW Hall of Fame.
