= Julia Kwon =

Korean-American artist

- Born: 1987; Arlington County
- Alma mater: Georgetown University; School of the Museum of Fine Arts at Tufts
- Occupation: Artist
- Style: textile arts
- Website: www.juliakwon.com

Julia Kwon (1987–present) is a Korean-American artist best known for her bojagi-inspired artwork. Her work has been featured at the Smithsonian Institution's Cooper Hewitt Museum and Smithsonian American Art Museum.

Kwon was born in 1987 in Arlington, Virginia. She attended Georgetown University and received a Bachelor of Arts degree in 2012, where she majored in studio art with a focus on painting. She went on to earn her Master in Fine Art from the School of the Museum of Fine Arts at Tufts University. She is best known for her large textile installation works that draws inspiration from Korean bojagi. Kwon's work addresses several issues, some include the objectification of Asian female bodies, anti-Asian violence, and abortion rights. She works as a lecturer at the Department of Art at the University of Maryland. Kwon is also affiliated with the American University as an adjunct professor lecturer.

Kwon's piece "Like Any Other" was on display in 2017 at the IA&A Hillyer art center in Washington D.C. From June 14 to August 4, 2019, Kwon's solo exhibition "More Than a Body" was on display at the Target Gallery in the Torpedo Factory Art Center in Washington D.C. In 2020 during the COVID-19 pandemic, Kwon sewed a series of cloth face masks for her "Unapologetically Asian" mask series to not only raise awareness around mask wearing but also to the anti-Asian violence in the United States. One of Kwon's masks was acquired by the Cooper Hewitt Museum and is featured in the exhibit "Design and Healing: Creative Responses to Epidemics".

Kwon was a 2021 Summer Artist in Residence at The Factory On Willow in Manchester, New Hampshire. Kwon's piece "Dissent" was featured at The Art Gallery at the University of Maryland's first in-person exhibit since the COVID-19 shutdown with fellow University of Maryland faculty in November 2021. From November 5, 2021, to January 16, 2022, Kwon's work was featured at the San Francisco Center for the Book's exhibit "Finding Common Ground: Sowing the Seeds of Community & Collaboration", along with other members of the Korean American Artists Collective.

In early 2022, Kwon was featured in the exhibit "In Spite of Modernism: Contemporary Art, Abstract Legacies, and Identity" at the Arlington Arts Center along with Paolo Arao, Asa Jackson, Esteban Ramón Pérez. From March 25 to April 30, 2022, Kwon's work for her "Never Mere Ornament" exhibition was displayed in the nonprofit VisArts' 355 Pod Space Gallery in Rockville, Maryland. In May 2022, Kwon's work was acquired by the Smithsonian American Art Museum for their exhibit "This Present Moment: Crafting a Better World".

== External Resources ==
- 2021 Interview with Kwon for the Smithsonian Magazine
- 2021 Interview with Kwon for The Coastal Post
