= Richard Brian Miller =

Richard B. Miller
- Occupations: Religious ethicist, author and academic

Academic background
- Education: BA; MA; PhD
- Alma mater: University of Virginia; Catholic University of America; University of Chicago

Academic work
- Institutions: Indiana University; University of Chicago

Richard B. Miller is an American religious ethicist, author and academic. He is a Laura Spelman Rockefeller Emeritus Professor of Religion, Politics, and Ethics in the Divinity School and in the College at the University of Chicago.

Miller's work focuses on the comparative and critical study of religion and ethics, especially in relation to public life, social ethics, and practical applications. His publications comprise research articles and seven books including Terror, Religion, and Liberal Thought and Interpretations of Conflict: Ethics, Pacifism, and the Just-War Tradition, which won Lake Forest University's Bross Prize, and both books were named Choice Outstanding Academic Titles. Among other honors, he has received the James P. Holland Award for Exemplary Teaching and Service to Students in 2007, the 2012 Tracy M. Sonneborn Prize from Indiana University, as well as grants from the Lilly Endowment, NEH, and NIH.

== Early life and education ==
Miller was born in 1953 in Washington, D.C., to Lucille Dean Miller and Henry L. Miller, a Navy fighter pilot and career officer. His upbringing involved extensive travel to locations including the Philippines, California, Hawaii, Washington, D.C. metropolitan area, and southern Maryland. He graduated from Ryken High School (now St. Mary's Ryken) in 1971. He then earned a BA in Religious Studies from the University of Virginia in 1975, followed by an MA in theology from the Catholic University of America in 1982, and earned his PhD in ethics and society at the University of Chicago in 1985. At UVA, his Senior Thesis, supervised by David Harned and James Childress, examined Karl Barth's theology of love. His MA thesis at CUA, guided by Charles Curran, focused on end-of-life ethics in the works of Joseph Fletcher, Paul Ramsey, and Richard McCormick. For his doctoral dissertation at the University of Chicago, directed by James Gustafson, he explored the ethics of nuclear deterrence and the just-war tradition.

== Career ==
Miller began his academic career with visiting roles at Indiana University from 1985 to 1986. He was appointed assistant professor in the Department of Religious Studies in 1986, later becoming associate professor in 1992 and serving as professor from 1996 to 2014. He was named provost professor in 2012. His involvement extended to administrative positions, including chair of the Department of Religious Studies from 2000 to 2003, and director of the Poynter Center for the Study of Ethics and American Institutions from 2003 to 2013.

In 2014, Miller joined the University of Chicago as a professor of religion, politics, and ethics in the divinity school and the college, and continues to serve as the Laura Spelman Rockefeller Emeritus Professor. He chaired the Divinity School Religious Ethics Area from 2015 to 2017 and for a second term from 2019 to 2021.

== Scholarship ==
Miller has contributed to the field of religious ethics by examining intersections between religion, public life, political and social ethics, and medical ethics, addressing topics such as humanitarian intervention, civil society, multiculturalism, and public intellectual discourse, while engaging with the ethics of war, bioethics, theological ethics, and the study of religion and moral philosophy. In 1991, he published his first book, Interpretations of Conflict: Ethics, Pacifism, and the Just-War Tradition, which engaged pacifism and just-war theory in dialogue, addressing shared values such as justice, civil disobedience, and moral reasoning. The following year, he edited War in the Twentieth Century: Sources in Theological Ethics, presenting Christian ethical perspectives on war justice, and has been described by David Attwood as an "excellent anthology." Furthermore, in Terror, Religion, and Liberal Thought, he explored how liberal principles can ethically address religious violence, balancing cultural respect with human rights, with Darren Walhof noting that it provided "a clear and useful account of liberal political ethics."

In 1996, Miller authored Casuistry and Modern Ethics: A Poetics of Practical Reasoning, proposing case-based reasoning as a way to address ethical dilemmas by focusing on individual cases rather than rigid principles, which John Berkman called "an important effort to defend the possibility of and in fact do 'thick' casuistry in and for a liberal society." Later, in Friends and Other Strangers: Studies in Religion, Ethics, and Culture, he expanded religious ethics to include cultural practices, interpersonal relationships, and public life, emphasizing empathy, solidarity, and moral responsibility. In a review for the Journal of the Society of Christian Ethics, Bill Barbieri regarded it as "essential reading for serious students of ethics." His recent book, Why Study Religion? (2021), critiqued the excessive focus on methodology in religious studies and introduced Critical Humanism, shaped by the values of post-critical reasoning, social criticism, cross-cultural fluency, and environmental responsibility. Andrew Dole remarked, "There are many reasons to admire this book and many ways in which scholarship might benefit from it."

Extending his focus to medical ethics, Miller drew upon ethnographic work in pediatric medical settings to publish Children, Ethics, and Modern Medicine in 2003. In that work, he argued that prioritizing beneficence over autonomy in pediatric care requires care providers to form a "therapeutic alliance" with families to determine the best approach for the child. Mary M. Doyle Roche stated, "Miller has provided a creative and stimulating resource for discussion among those committed to serving and promoting the health and well-being of children."

== Awards and honors ==
- 1975 – Induction, Phi Beta Kappa
- 1990 – Bross Prize, Lake Forest University
- 1990 – Summer Stipend, National Endowment for the Humanities
- 1992, 2011 – Outstanding Academic Title, Choice
- 1996-97 – Residential Fellowship in the Program for Ethics and the Professions, Harvard University
- 2007 – James P. Holland Award, Indiana University
- 2012 – Tracy M. Sonneborn Prize, Indiana University

== Bibliography ==
=== Books ===
- Interpretations of Conflict: Ethics, Pacifism, and the Just-War Tradition (1991) ISBN 978-0226527963
- War in the Twentieth Century: Sources in Theological Ethics (1992) ISBN 978-0664253233
- Casuistry and Modern Ethics: A Poetics of Practical Reasoning (1996) ISBN 978-0226526379
- Children, Ethics, and Modern Medicine (2003) ISBN 978-0253342225
- Terror, Religion, and Liberal Thought (2010) ISBN 978-0231150996
- Friends and Other Strangers: Studies in Religion, Ethics, and Culture (2016) ISBN 978-0231174886
- Why Study Religion? (2021) ISBN 978-0197566817

=== Selected articles ===
- Miller, R. B. (1997). Critical representations. Journal of the American Academy of Religion, 65(4), 727-744.
- Miller, R. B. (2002). Aquinas and the presumption against killing and war. Journal of Religion, 82(2), 173–204.
- Miller, R. B. (2005). On making a cultural turn in religious ethics. Journal of Religious Ethics, 33(3), 409–443.
- Miller, R. B. (2008). Justifications of the Iraq War examined. Ethics & International Affairs, 22(1), 43–67.
- Miller, R. B. (2009). Killing, self-defense, and bad luck. Journal of Religious Ethics 37(1), 131–58.
- Miller, R. B. (2009). Just War, civic virtue, and democratic social criticism: Augustinian reflections. Journal of Religion, 89(1), 1-30.
- Miller, R. B. (2011). Evil, friendship, and iconic realism in Augustine's Confessions. Harvard Theological Review, 104(4), 387–409.
- Miller, R. B. (2020). Augustine, moral luck, and the ethics of regret and shame. Journal of Religion, 100(3), 361–85.
- Miller, R. B. (2023). The Ethics and Politics of Religious Ethics, 1973–2023. Journal of Religious Ethics, 51(1), 66–107.
- Miller, R. B. (2024). Critical humanism and the study of religion: A statement and defense. Method & Theory in the Study of Religion, 36, 206–218.
