= Virginia Griffing =

American physicist and chemist

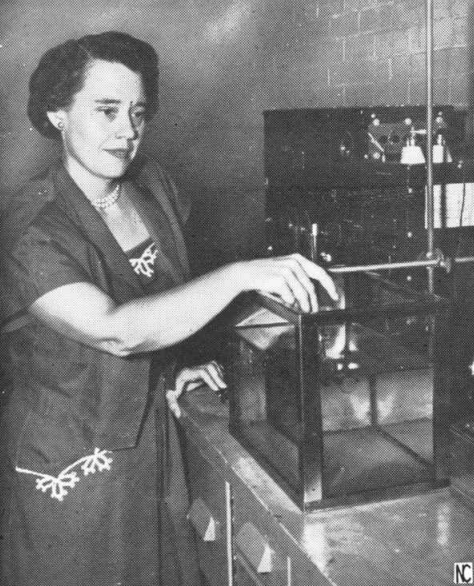
- Born: 19 August 1917; Lexington, Kentucky
- Died: 5 September 1963 (age 46); Halifax, Canada
- Education: University of Kentucky; Mount Holyoke College; Catholic University of America
- Scientific career
- Workplaces: Catholic University of America
- Thesis: The Size and Vibration Frequency of the Excited Benzene Molecule (1948)
- Doctoral advisor: Karl Herzfeld
- Doctoral students: Harry Lee Morrison

Virginia Frances Griffing (19 August 1917 – 5 September 1963) was an American physicist and chemist. She was the first woman on the faculty of Catholic University of America's physics department and the first woman lay faculty member of the university's chemistry department. Her research specialty was in ultrasonics and molecule structures.

== Early life and education ==
Griffing was born in Lexington, Kentucky. She attended the University of Kentucky, where she received her bachelor's degree in 1937. She was a member of Phi Beta Kappa.

She went on to pursue graduate studies at Mount Holyoke College, where she earned a master's degree in 1940. After taking a pause from her studies to teach, she began her doctoral program at Catholic University in 1943.

In 1947 she received a doctorate in physics from Catholic, where she studied under Karl Herzfeld. Her thesis was titled "The Size and Vibration Frequency of the Excited Benzene Molecule."

== Career ==
After receiving her master's degree, Griffing initially taught in the Kentucky public schools. In 1941, she joined the faculty of the Morehead State Teachers College (now Morehead State University). She taught there until 1943 as an instructor of physics and mathematics.

In 1943, the same year she began her doctoral studies at Catholic University, she commenced an assistantship in physics at the university. She became an instructor in the department in 1946. She began teaching in the chemistry department in 1947, and was promoted to associate professor of chemistry in 1953, and full professor in 1957. One of her students was Harry Lee Morrison, who would go on to become the first Black physics faculty member at the University of California, Berkeley.

In 1952, she led a U.S. Naval Research Laboratory-backed project titled "Chemical Effects of Ultra-Sonic Waves." In 1955, Griffing lectured on her research in molecular orbital theory and participated in a symposium on the quantum theory of molecules at the Stockholm University and the Uppsala University. The same year, she also lectured on the "Chemical Effects of Ultrasonics" at the Instituto Nazionale di Ultracustiaca, one of the institutes of Italy's National Research Council. From 1944 to 1956, during and after World War II, she held a civilian post in the US Navy's Office of Scientific Research and Development, and beginning in 1958, she was a consultant at the U.S. National Bureau of Standards.

She was a member of the Sigma Pi Sigma and Sigma Xi honors societies, and a member of both the American Physical Society and the American Association of Physics Teachers.

== Research ==
Griffing's research work spanned both physics and chemistry, the two disciplines in which she also held professorships. Her early work focused on the theory of ultrasonic absorption in liquids, with an emphasis on the question of how chemical effects are produced by ultrasonics, and was conducted with the Reverend Francis E. Fox. After 1955, her work shifted to reactive interactions between atoms and molecules, and "applied quantum-mechanical methods in attempting to clarify concepts in chemical kinetics systems of atoms and molecules using a priori molecular-orbital calculations".
