= John T. Tozzi =

American former rear admiral

John T. Tozzi is a former rear admiral in the United States Coast Guard.

== Career ==
Tozzi graduated from the United States Coast Guard Academy in 1968. During the Vietnam War, he served aboard USCGC Winnebago (WHEC-40). Later, he was assigned to USCGC Bering Strait (WAVP-382), USCGC Kukui (WAK-186) and USCGC Chase (WHEC-718) before becoming executive officer of USCGC Boutwell (WHEC-719) and commanding USCGC Rush (WHEC-723) and USCGC Sherman (WHEC-720).

Tozzi served as the first Director of Information and Technology of the Coast Guard from 1996 to 1997. He then became Assistant Commandant for Systems and remained in the position until his retirement in 1999.

Awards he received during his career include the Coast Guard Distinguished Service Medal, the Defense Superior Service Medal, the Legion of Merit, the Meritorious Service Medal and the Coast Guard Commendation Medal.

== Civilian education ==
Tozzi earned a master's degrees in Naval Architecture & Marine Engineering and in Mechanical Engineering from the Massachusetts Institute of Technology as well as a Ph.D. in Fluid Mechanics from the Catholic University of America.
