= Nancy H. Nielsen =

American physician

- Born: West Virginia, U.S.

Academic background
- Education: BA, West Virginia University; PhD, Microbiology, 1969, Catholic University of America; MD, 1976, Jacobs School of Medicine and Biomedical Sciences

Academic work
- Institutions: University at Buffalo

Nancy H. Nielsen is an American physician. She is the senior associate dean for health policy in the Jacobs School of Medicine and Biomedical Sciences. In 2009, Nielsen was recognized with an election to the Institute of Medicine (now called the National Academy of Medicine) for her medical advocacy work.

== Early life and education ==
Nielsen was born in West Virginia, USA, and was raised a Baptist. Once she enrolled at West Virginia University for her undergraduate degree, Nielsen converted to Catholicism. Upon graduating, she enrolled at Catholic University of America for her PhD in microbiology and her medical degree at Jacobs School of Medicine and Biomedical Sciences. In between Catholic University and medical school, Nielsen served as Chair of the biology department at D'Youville University.

== Career ==
Following medical school, Nielsen established and worked at a private practice for over a decade while simultaneously serving as an Assistant Dean for Academic and Student Affairs at the University at Buffalo. Beyond this, she was also appointed Chief Medical Officer of Western Regional Offices for the New York State Department of Health. In 2007, Nielsen became the second woman to be named president-elect of the American Medical Association (AMA) after serving in various leadership roles with the organization since 2000. The following year, Nielsen was named the recipient of the 2008 UB Distinguished Medical Alumnus Award and was selected to present the inaugural Oliver P. "O.P." Jones, M.D., '56, Endowed Lectureship in Medical Education. In 2009, Nielsen was recognized with an election to the Institute of Medicine (now called the National Academy of Medicine) for her medical advocacy work.

In 2011, Nielsen was appointed to a one-year role as a health senior advisor for stakeholder engagement at the Center for Medicare and Medicaid Innovation in the Centers for Medicare & Medicaid Services. Her health policy efforts were recognized with the Henry I. Fineberg Award for Distinguished Service from the Medical Society of the State of New York. During the COVID-19 pandemic, Nielsen participated in weekly interviews on WBFO about events surrounding the pandemic.
