= Regina Flannery Herzfeld =

American anthropologist

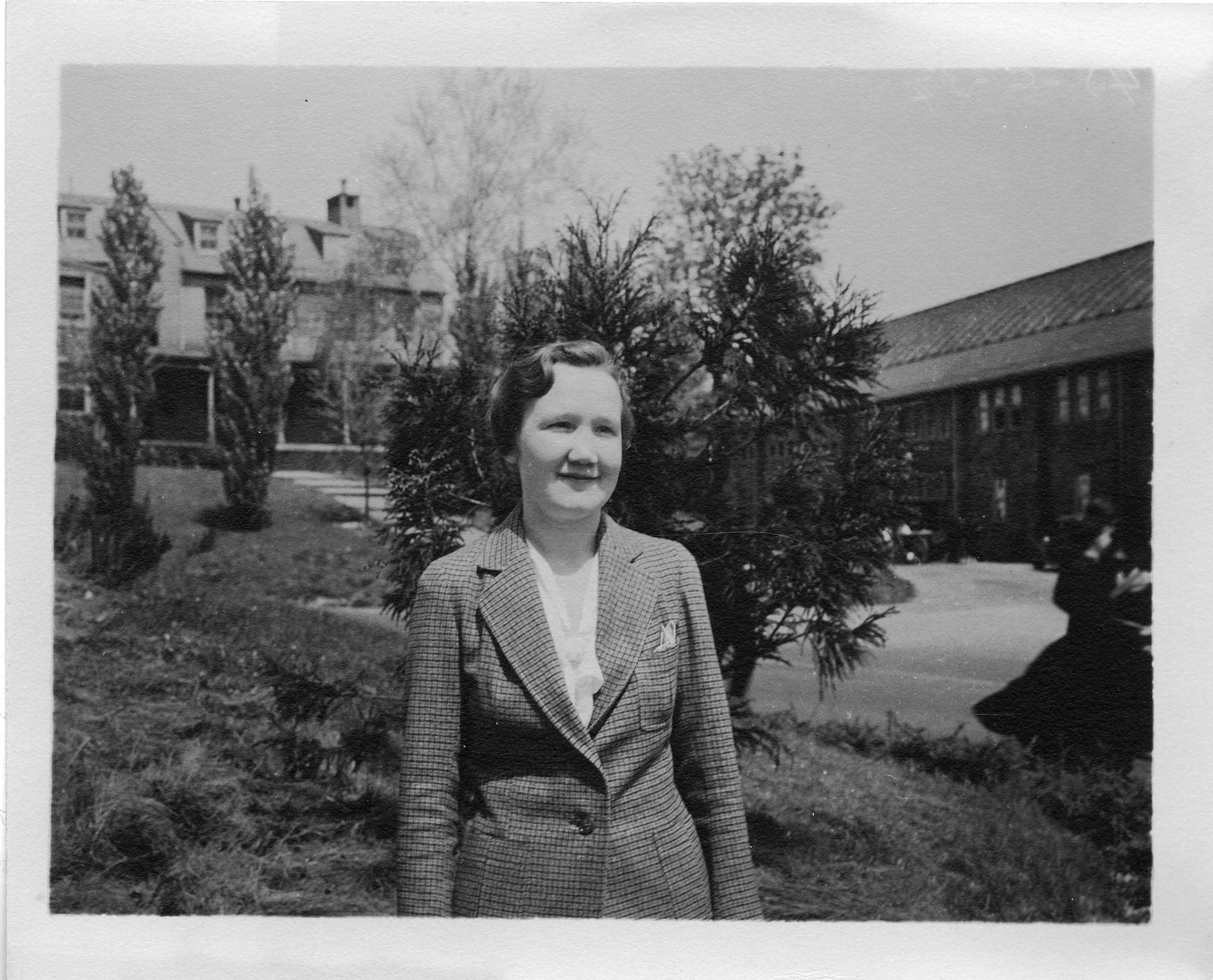
- Regina Flannery (later Herzfeld) in the 1930s
- Born: Regina Flannery; December 1904; Washington, D.C.
- Died: November 26, 2004 (age 99); Washington, D.C.
- Occupations: Anthropologist, college professor
- Spouse: Karl Herzfeld
- Relatives: Charles M. Herzfeld (nephew)

Regina Flannery Herzfeld (December 1904 – November 26, 2004) was an American anthropologist. She was a professor of anthropology at the Catholic University of America (CUA) from 1935 to 1971, and editor of Anthropological Quarterly from 1949 to 1963.

== Early life and education ==
Regina Flannery was born in Washington, D.C., the daughter of Martin Markham Flannery and Regina Fowler Flannery. She attended a Catholic high school, and graduated from Trinity College in Washington, D.C. She earned a master's degree in anthropology from the Catholic University of America in 1931, and completed her doctoral studies there in 1938.

== Career ==
In 1935, Flannery was the first laywoman to join the faculty of CUA. She was an anthropology professor there, and a full professor from 1953 until her retirement in 1971; she was chair of the anthropology department from 1953 to 1969, the first woman to be a department head at CUA.

Flannery's research involved studies of the Cree, Gros Ventre, Montagnais, and Mesaclero Apache cultures, especially marriage and social customs affecting women's and children's lives. She was editor of Anthropological Quarterly from 1949 to 1963. She was president of the Anthropology Society of Washington, and secretary of the American Anthropological Association.

== Publications ==
Flannery published dozens of scholarly articles in academic journals, including Anthropological Quarterly, Journal of Educational Sociology, Southwestern Journal of Anthropology, Journal of American Folklore, Anthropos, Arctic Anthropology, and Anthropologica. A complete bibliography of her work was published in 2006 by Viviana Cristian.

- "The Position of Woman among the Mescalero Apache" (1932)
- "Gossip as a Clue to Attitudes" (1934)
- "The Position of Woman among the Eastern Cree" (1935)
- "Some Aspects of James Bay Recreative Culture" (1936)
- "Child Behavior from the Standpoint of the Cultural Anthropologist" (1937)
- "Cross-Cousin Marriage among the Cree and Montagnais of James Bay" (1938)
- An Analysis of Coastal Algonquian Culture (1939)
- "The Shaking-Tent Rite among the Montagnais of James Bay" (1939)
- "The Cultural Position of the Spanish River Indians" (1940)
- "Social Mechanisms in Gros Ventre Gambling" (1946, with John M. Cooper)
- "Algonquian Indian Folklore" (1947)
- The Gros Ventres of Montana (1952)
- "Infancy and Childhood among the Indians of the East Coast of James Bay" (1962)
- "Some magico-religious concepts of the Algonquians on the east coast of James Bay" (1971)
- "Witiko Accounts from the James Bay Cree" (1981, with Mary Elizabeth Chambers and Patricia A. Jehle)
- "Each Man Has His Own Friends: The Role of Dream Visitors in Traditional East Cree Belief and Practice" (1985, with Mary Elizabeth Chambers)
- "John M. Cooper's Investigation of James Bay Family Hunting Grounds, 1927-1934" (1986, with Mary Elizabeth Chambers)
- Ellen Smallboy: Glimpses of a Cree Woman's Life (1995)

== Personal life ==
Flannery married Vienna-born physicist Karl Herzfeld in 1938. Her husband died in 1978, and she died in 2004, in Washington, shortly before her 100th birthday. CUA hosts an annual Regina Flannery Herzfeld symposium in her memory. Some of her papers, including field notes, are in the archives at CUA. Scientist and defense researcher Charles M. Herzfeld was her nephew.
