= Venigalla Rao =

Indian-American biochemist and academic

Venigalla B. Rao
- Born: Andhra Pradesh
- Education: Indian Institute of Science; Andhra University
- Scientific career
- Workplaces: University of Maryland School of Medicine, Baltimore; The Catholic University of America
- Website: t4 Lab

Venigalla Basaveswara Rao is an Indian-American biochemist who is a professor of biology at the Catholic University of America. He serves as Director of the Bacteriophage Medical Research Center. In 2021, he was elected a Fellow of the American Society for Microbiology and the National Academy of Inventors.

== Early life and education ==
Rao was born in Donepudi, a village in Andhra Pradesh. His family owned a small farm. Rao enrolled at a college ten miles from his home, and rode a bicycle there and back every day. At college he became interested in chemistry. He was an undergraduate at Andhra University, where he specialized in biochemistry. He completed his doctoral research at the Indian Institute of Science, where he focused on enzyme engineering. As a postdoctoral fellow, he was introduced to bacteriophages at the University of Maryland, Baltimore County. Over the course of his fellowship, Rao developed strategies to control the assembly of bacteriophage t4 in a test tube.

== Research and career ==
Rao works on bacteriophages to understand the mechanisms of DNA packaging in double-stranded icosahedral viruses. His early work explored the molecular structures that underpinned the DNA packaging machine, the motor and the capsid. He studied the fastest and most effective DNA packaging machine ever known, the large icosahedral virus bacteriophage T4. The motor (17 nm wide and 9 nm high) would be more powerful than that of a car engine if it were scaled.

Rao joined the Catholic University of America in 1989, where he has served as an associate professor, full professor, chair and director. He has investigated the application of bacteriophage T4 in vaccines against HIV/AIDS, the flu, the plague and anthrax. He argued that such vaccines would be more cost-effective, easier to administer and provide more long-term protection. Rao developed a nasal vaccine to tackle COVID-19. The needle-free vaccine is a noninfectious bacteriophage t4-based multi-component vaccine that contains spike trimers. The vaccine is created by tailoring a harmless Bacteriophage t4 (Escherichia virus) virus, such that it delivers an antidote to COVID-19. These nasal vaccines may induce immunity in the mucous lining, which could prevent viral transmission.

== Awards and honors ==
- 2021 Elected Fellow of the American Society for Microbiology
- 2021 Elected Fellow of the National Academy of Inventors

== Selected publications ==
- Venigalla B Rao; Michael Feiss (1 January 2008). "The bacteriophage DNA packaging motor". Annual Review of Genetics. 42: 647–681. doi:10.1146/annurev.genet.42.110807.091545. ISSN 0066-4197. PMID 18687036. Wikidata Q37237759.
- Andrei Fokine; Paul R Chipman; Petr G. Leiman; Vadim V Mesyanzhinov; Venigalla Rao; Michael G Rossmann (7 April 2004). "Molecular architecture of the prolate head of bacteriophage T4". Proceedings of the National Academy of Sciences of the United States of America. 101 (16): 6003–6008. Bibcode:2004PNAS..101.6003F. doi:10.1073/pnas.0400444101. ISSN 0027-8424. PMC 395913. PMID 15071181. Wikidata Q37646448.
- Siyang Sun; Kiran Kondabagil; Bonnie Draper; et al. (26 December 2008). "The structure of the phage T4 DNA packaging motor suggests a mechanism dependent on electrostatic forces". Cell. 135 (7): 1251–62. doi:10.1016/j.cell.2008.11.015. ISSN 0092-8674. PMID 19109896. Wikidata Q27653281.
