= Patrick Fahey =

Friar and liturgist

Dr Patrick James Fahey O.S.A. (order of St Augustine), is an Augustinian friar, liturgist, musician and Prior Provincial of the Australian Province of the Order of St Augustine (1997–2006). He is a graduate of Villanova University (PA), The Catholic University of America (D.C.) and the Pontifical Institute of Liturgy (Rome).

== Background ==
From 1980 in Rome, he lectured in liturgy and sacramental theology at the Patristic Institute, at the Regina Mundi Pontifical Institute) and the Pontifical University of St. Thomas Aquinas (Angelicum). He subsequently lectured in liturgical and sacramental theology and catholic theology and religious education at the Australian Catholic University (N.S.W.). A talented liturgical musician, he founded the boys' choir at St. Augustine's College, Brookvale N.S.W. Australia in the 1960s. He was also musical director and master of the choristers of Brisbane's Cathedral of St Stephen, Brisbane from 1977. In the same year he was appointed first director of Brisbane's Pastoral Liturgical Institute.

While teaching in Rome, he contributed articles on The Mass, Blessings and Sacramental Seal of Confession in the Dizionario Patristico e delle Antichita` Cristiane (Institum Patristicum Augustinianum, RomaL Editrice Marietti, dir. Angelo di Berardino). He is now retired and living in the Parich of North Harbour, Sydney, Australia.
