= Gary Vena =

Gary Vena is an Emeritus Professor of English and Drama at Manhattan University in New York City. Vena has received a Bachelor of Arts (B.A.) from Fordham University, two Master of Arts (M.A.) degrees, one from Catholic University of America and the other from New York University, and a Ph.D. from New York University.
