= Nessa Morgan =

- Also known as: Neska
- Born: Vanessa Morgan; Wellington, North Island, New Zealand
- Origin: Sydney, New South Wales, Australia
- Genres: R&B; crunk
- Occupation: Musician
- Instrument: Vocals
- Labels: Gotham/BMG; Probono

Vanessa "Nessa" Morgan, who also performs as Neska, is a New Zealand-born, Australian R&B singer and songwriter. She has released two albums, Sex & Poverty (May 2004) and Neska (2008). She was based in the United States from 2005 to 2010.

== Biography ==
Morgan is a Māori singer-songwriter and was born in Wellington, New Zealand. Her family moved to Sydney when she was 3-years-old. She was brought up in a musical family, her father was a singer in a funk band. She has three siblings and the family relocated to Newcastle, where she attended school. From the age of 15 she worked with her parents in a trio, Arkestra.

At 24, in 2002, Morgan started writing her own music. She was signed to Gotham/BMG and her debut album, Sex & Poverty, appeared in May 2004. The album was recorded at the House of Blues in Los Angeles, it was produced by Don Was, which peaked at No. 98 on the ARIA Albums Chart and No. 10 on their Hitseekers Albums Chart. Its lead single, "Simple Kinda Woman", appeared in October, which peaked at No. 11 on the ARIA Hitseekers Singles Chart. Morgan supported Alicia Keys at a concert at the Enmore Theatre, in October.

In March 2005 she appeared on SBS TV's music variety quiz show, RocKwiz' episode 8, and besides being a celebrity contest she performed her song, "Simple Kinda Woman", and a duet with Ross Wilson on a cover version of "Take Me to the River". The latter was released on CD for a Various Artists' compilation album, RocKwiz Duets, in August 2006, and an associated DVD, RocKwiz Duets: Two for the Show.

Morgan relocated to the United States where she established an independent label, ProBono Records, in Atlanta in 2005. She re-imaged herself as Neska and released a self-titled second album in November 2008. Marcie Konsoulas of Planet Urban reviewed the album, "What happened to the simple kind of woman who wants a simple kind of man? Her raw proud Aussie demeanor has been overcast by a bad-girl sex kitten image that not only doesn’t do her justice but is also far from believable. Her sound is no longer unique and would get lost amongst all the standard U.S. R&B singers."

Its first single, "Like It Like That" (July 2007), was nominated for best R&B single at the Urban Music Awards. "Like It Like That", also reached No. 11 on the Hitseekers Singles Chart. Konsoulas further observed, "The sultriness that appeared on the first album has been replaced with tackiness with lyrics like 'spank my ass and pull my hair' and that's just on the first single." By March 2010 the singer had returned to Sydney and reverted to performing as Nessa Morgan.

== Discography ==
=== Albums ===
- Sex & Poverty (May 2004) – Gotham Records / BMG Australia (GOTH04012) AUS: No. 98
- Neska (November 2008) – Probono Records (PROBONO010)

=== Singles ===
- "Simple Kinda Woman" (October 2004) – Gotham Records / BMG Australia (GOTH04052) AUS Hitseekers: No. 11
- "Like It Like That" (July 2007) – Probono Records (PROBONO010) AUS Hitseekers: No. 11
- "Helpless" (2010) – Morgan Entertainment Group
