= John E. Straub =

John Straub was the Special Assistant to the President and Director of the White House Office of Administration in the Executive Office of the President until September 2006. In this capacity, Mr. Straub was responsible for the day-to-day management and operations of the EOP including serving as CFO and CIO, as well as managing security, facilities, human resources, and travel. Mr. Straub also served in the George H. W. Bush administration as the Internal Controls Officer.

Before joining the George W. Bush Administration, Mr. Straub served as an Associate Dean for Harvard University's John F. Kennedy School of Government. Earlier in his career, Mr. Straub served as Deputy Chief Administrative Officer and Chief Financial Officer of the United States House of Representatives.

During this time with the US House of Representatives, Mr. Straub is credited with leading the institution to its first ever clean audit opinion in its history.

Mr. Straub has begun serving as the Chancellor and Chief Financial Officer for the Roman Catholic Archdiocese of Boston under Cardinal Seán P. O'Malley, beginning from October 2012.

As of 2026, Mr. Straub serves on the Boards of St. John's Seminary, Campaign for Catholic Schools, Catholic Community Fund, and St. Joseph's College. Mr. Straub also served as the first Executive Director for FIRST, an international youth organization that inspires students in engineering and technology fields.

He received his bachelor's degree from the Catholic University of America.
