= Nessa Feddis =

American lawyer

Nessa Feddis (born 1958) is an American attorney and banking industry spokesperson.

== Personal ==
Born Nessa Eileen Feddis in November 1958, Feddis is one of six daughters of Eileen and Robert Feddis, both natives of Dublin, Ireland, who met while serving in the armed forces. Robert Feddis retired in 2007 as Cumberland, Maryland's first orthopedic surgeon. Nessa Feddis was born in Maryland and eventually moved to Washington, D.C. where she has lived ever since.

Feddis competed in rowing on the Potomac Boat Club team in D.C. In 1997, she won a gold in the Head of the Charles Regatta Master 8s and a silver in 1998. She earned her degree in law from the Catholic University.

== Career ==
As senior vice president and deputy chief counsel for consumer protection and payments at the American Bankers Association's (ABA) Center for Regulatory Compliance, she focuses on consumer protection laws and payment system issues. She analyzes and instructs on various regulatory and legislative proposals and final laws related to consumer financial services including credit and debit cards, privacy, deposit accounts, payments systems, and payment system fraud prevention. She informs Congress and government agencies on these subjects. She has testified before Congress.

She is a former president of the American College of Consumer Financial Services Lawyers and former Chair of the Subcommittee on Electronic Fund Transfers of the American Bar Association's Consumer Financial Services Committee. She is also on the faculty at Practising Law Institute.

Feddis' has contributed articles discussing regulatory and legislative developments in consumer banking matters to ABA Banking Journal and ABA Bank Compliance.

=== Media Interviews ===
Feddis appeared on PBS' NewsHour with Jim Lehrer in March 2011 to discuss the Fed's proposed rule regarding interchange. She said, "Interchange is basically the merchants' contribution to creating this very valuable, available-24/7, reliable system. And that's how it started. It really was a merchant phenomenon. The merchants, or the businesses, were getting tired of the losses from when their checks were returned. So they basically agreed to pay the fee and shift those losses and the risk of those losses back to the bank. And that's what it amounts to. So, the fee covers the cost of providing this 24/7-available system. And it's reliable. It's quick. It's secure. It not only helps maintain it, but it helps improve it. That means innovation. And one of the great concerns here is that, if they don't have the money, you won't see any more innovation."

Feddis predicted on various national news stations, including PBS' NewsHour with Jim Lehrer, and on ABC News that the Credit CARD Act would mean that credit card rates would increase generally, small businesses and consumers would find it harder to obtain credit, and limits would be lower.

Recent data show that since the credit card restrictions ultimately adopted in the CARD Act were proposed in 2008, credit card interest rates have increased and credit card credit availability has declined. In contrast, during the same period, interest rates on other types of consumer credit declined, and non-revolving, non-mortgage debt as a percent of disposable income increased, suggesting that the economy alone cannot explained the increased credit cards interest rates and reduced availability.

In an interview on PBS NewsHour with Jim Lehrer she said, “The bills and the rules restrict the ability of card companies to adjust to changing environments, changing risks. Over time, the market changes. Over time, people change. And if [the credit card companies] can't adjust to that risk -- and risk equals cost -- other people have to absorb it. In other words, people who manage their credit well end up having to pay for people who don't repay their loans.”

On ABC News she said, “Riskier borrowers pay more for loans just like riskier drivers pay more for car insurance. And the inability to price for risk means that the cost is spread out over everybody.”

Subsequently, in another interview on PBS NewsHour with Jim Lehrer when asked whether the Credit CARD Act could mean credit cards would be more difficult for some to obtain, Ms. Feddis responded, “Congress understood when they passed this law that one of the effects would be that many people, many small businesses wouldn't be able to get credit cards as easily, accounts would be closed, limits would be lowered. They also understood that, across-the-board, interest rates would go up a bit for everybody.”

In response to the observation that this was already happening, she said, “We're seeing that in the advertised rates, the new accounts, but [Congress] also understood that people who manage their credit well will to some degree be subsidizing or paying for those who don't. But they made the decision that this was an acceptable compromise -- a tradeoff, if you will -- for the consumer protections.

A 2011 study by Argus Information & Advisory Services found that, based on cardholder data of the 9 largest credit card issuers, credit card interest rates increased and credit availability decreased since credit card restrictions ultimately adopted in the CARD Act were proposed in 2008.

She also noted the positive aspects of the CARD Act, “The predominant effect of this new law is that consumers will no longer be surprised by an interest rate increase. For the most part, they will receive a 45-day advanced notice and, more importantly, the option to pay off the existing balance over time at the original rate."

As a banking industry representative, Feddis suggested in an interview with USA Today that the credit industry's treatment of students gives students a beneficial crash course in financial management, noting that unexpected fees may present “an opportunity to learn to manage a bank account.”

A 2007 Washington Post article — on banks' debit card overdraft fees — quoted her testimony before a subcommittee of the House Financial Services Committee stating that paying overdrafts “helps to avoid embarrassment, inconvenience, merchant fees and other adverse consequences of having a check bounce or a transaction denied.” The article notes that she added: "Careful tracking by the customer of transactions is an important responsibility. It is even more critical today than ever before, as there are many new and convenient ways to pay for the goods and services we buy." The article also pointed out that she testified that customers should keep track of their money, “because they are in a better position to know their actual balance. Only they know about the most recent automatic payments they have authorized and debit card transactions they have approved.”

The Washington Post columnist pointed out that debit card issuers could notify customers electronically, allowing them to avoid the overdraft fees. The article contended that "financial institutions don't want to change the status quo because they make good and easy money off their own customers' mistakes and irresponsibility." Feddis responded that "current technology [2007] makes real-time notification [at the point of sale] of overdrafts cost-prohibitive."

Feddis has also pointed out that the majority of bank customers don't pay any banking fees—including overdrafts—in a 2009 MarketWatch article. She says, “Anyone's bank account can fall short from time to time but overdraft fees are 100% avoidable. Just like a parking ticket, they're meant to be a deterrent.”

In Frontline's September 2009 documentary titled The Card Game, which investigated questionable practices of the American credit card industry and the relationship of credit card abuse to the 2008 financial crisis, when asked about the arrogance of the banking industry, Feddis replied: "Well, once Congress and the regulators identified the problems, they addressed it, and the industry is moving on.
