= Yazmany Arboleda =

Colombian American multi-media artist

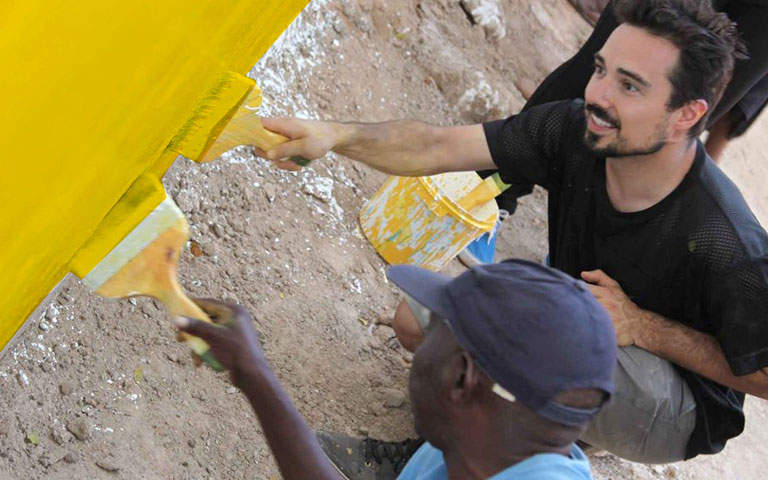
- Arboleda painting a mosque Optimistic Yellow.
- Born: May 7, 1981 (age 45); Boston, Massachusetts, US
- Education: Catholic University of America, Parson's School of Design, Universitat Politecnica de Catalunya, Istituto Marangoni; Juilliard School
- Known for: Large Scale Participatory Art Interventions
- Notable work: The People's Bus, The Hospital for the Soul, Colour In Faith, Espejismo

Yazmany Arboleda (born May 7, 1981) is a Colombian-American artist based in New York City whose work includes large-scale participatory installations and public interventions addressing social, cultural, and political themes.

Arboleda serves as New York City’s first People’s Artist at the Civic Engagement Commission, where he has described his participatory approach as “Living Sculptures”—projects organized around collective making and shared action in public space. Trained as an architect, he has framed public space as a site for civic participation and community engagement.

Arboleda has been commissioned by institutions including Carnegie Hall, the Yale School of Management, and the United Nations. He has lectured on art in public space, and was named one of Good Magazine’s 100 People Making Our World Better in 2013.

His work has included projects in conflict and post-conflict settings. In 2013, he participated in a Kabul project in which 10,000 pink balloons were distributed across the city as a collective public gesture. In Johannesburg, he used color interventions on derelict high-rise buildings to draw attention to housing neglect and allegations of corruption.

In 2015, Arboleda developed Colour In Faith, a project in which religious communities across Kenya collaborated to paint the exteriors of mosques, temples, and churches yellow as a gesture of solidarity and coexistence. The project was nominated later that year for the Disruption By Design (DxD) award.

Arboleda holds a Master of Architecture degree from The Catholic University of America in Washington, D.C., and has completed art and design programs at Parsons School of Design in New York City, Universitat Politècnica de Catalunya in Barcelona, and Istituto Marangoni in Milan and London. In 2014, he participated in the Juilliard School’s inaugural inter-arts program.

Arboleda has written for the Huffington Post on art and culture, including interviews with figures such as Anna Deavere Smith, Anish Kapoor, Lauren Hutton, and Marina Abramović.

In 2020, Arboleda was appointed the first Artist-in-Residence at the New York City Civic Engagement Commission. In that role, he helped transform a former Department of Correction bus used on Rikers Island into the People’s Bus, a mobile civic space for art-making, storytelling, and participatory democracy.

In 2023, the People’s Bus was transformed into Tippy: The Tender People’s Money Monster, a large-scale mobile puppet created to promote New York City’s first citywide participatory budgeting initiative, known as The People’s Money.

== Art ==
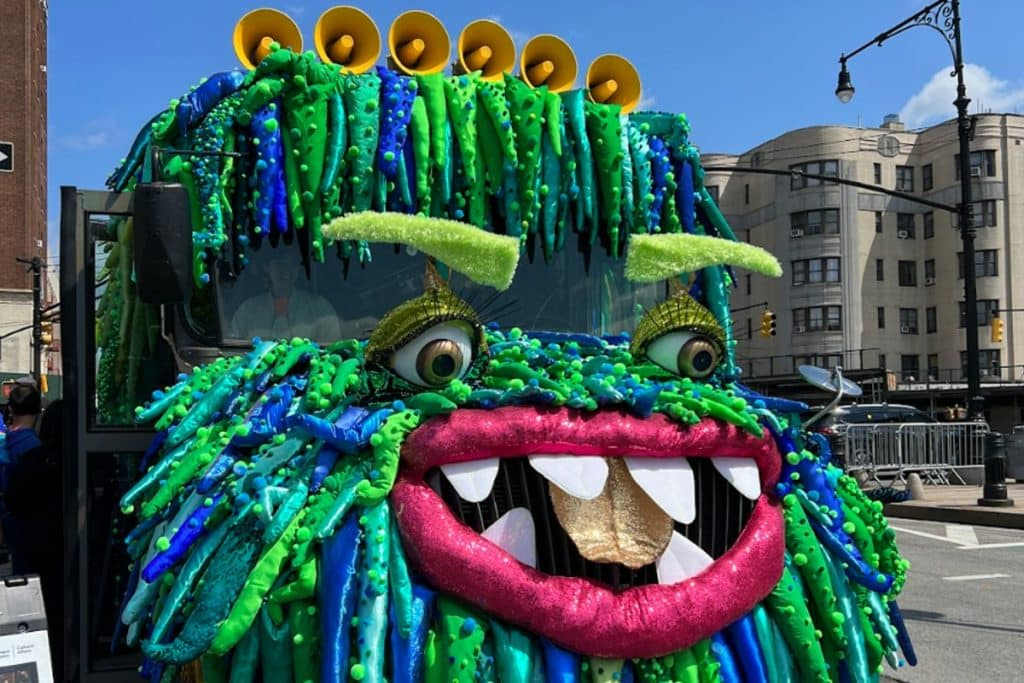
This Former NYC Correction Bus Is Now A Massive Mobile Puppet Named ‘Tippy’

Arboleda’s work spans painting, photography, film, sculpture, installation, and participatory projects. Writing in Art Monthly, Ben Bergman described his practice as examining how media and information shape contemporary experience, including the erosion of trust in institutions such as government, business, and journalism.

His installations have addressed politics, current events, racism, and sexism, and have sometimes drawn public criticism or controversy.

== Monday Morning ==
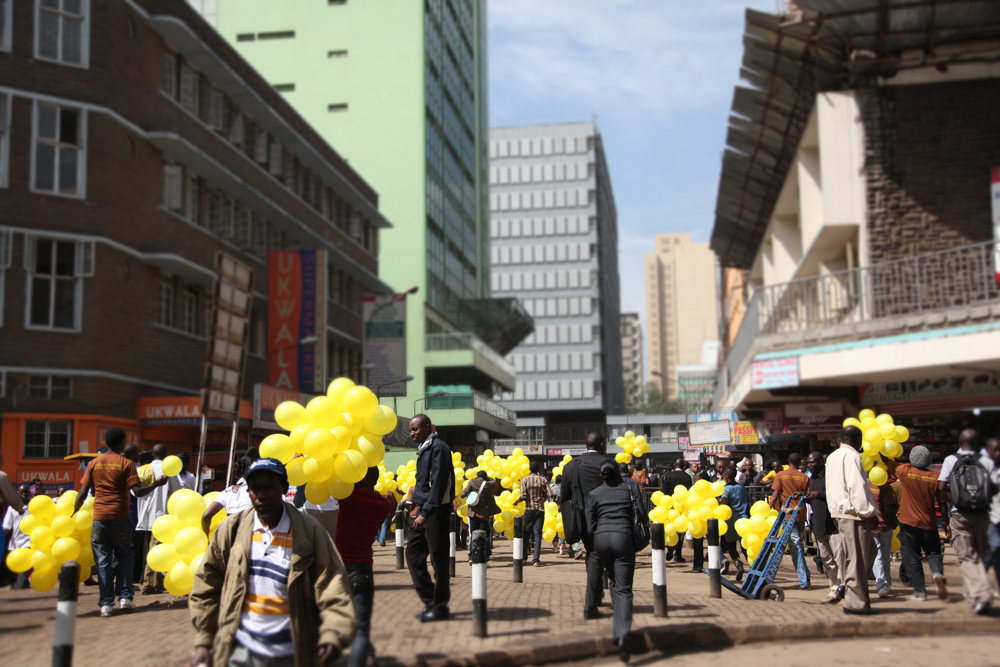
Monday Morning Nairobi, 7 November 2011

Arboleda created Monday Morning, a participatory project he described as a “Living Sculpture,” in which volunteers distributed more than 10,000 balloons to commuters in multiple cities. The project took place in Shivajinagar in India, Yamaguchi in Japan, and Nairobi in Kenya, among other locations.

During the Nairobi iteration, the BBC reported that the distribution occurred while Kenya was on high alert following the government’s deployment of troops to Somalia amid concerns about al-Shabab-linked kidnappings.

== The Keller Gates Project ==
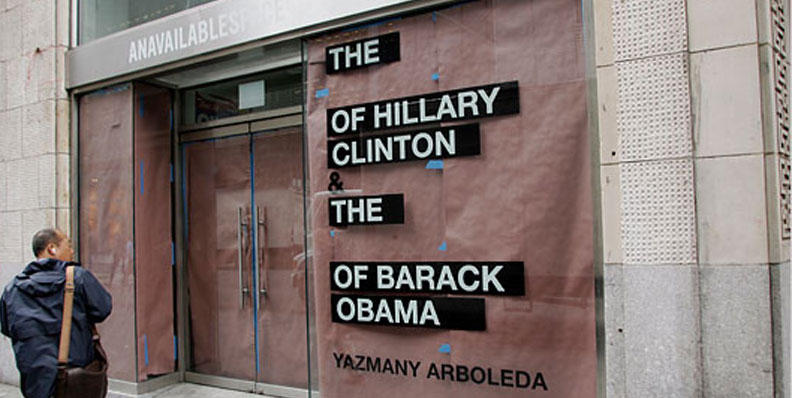
ANAVAILABLESPACE Installation in New York, New York, 2008

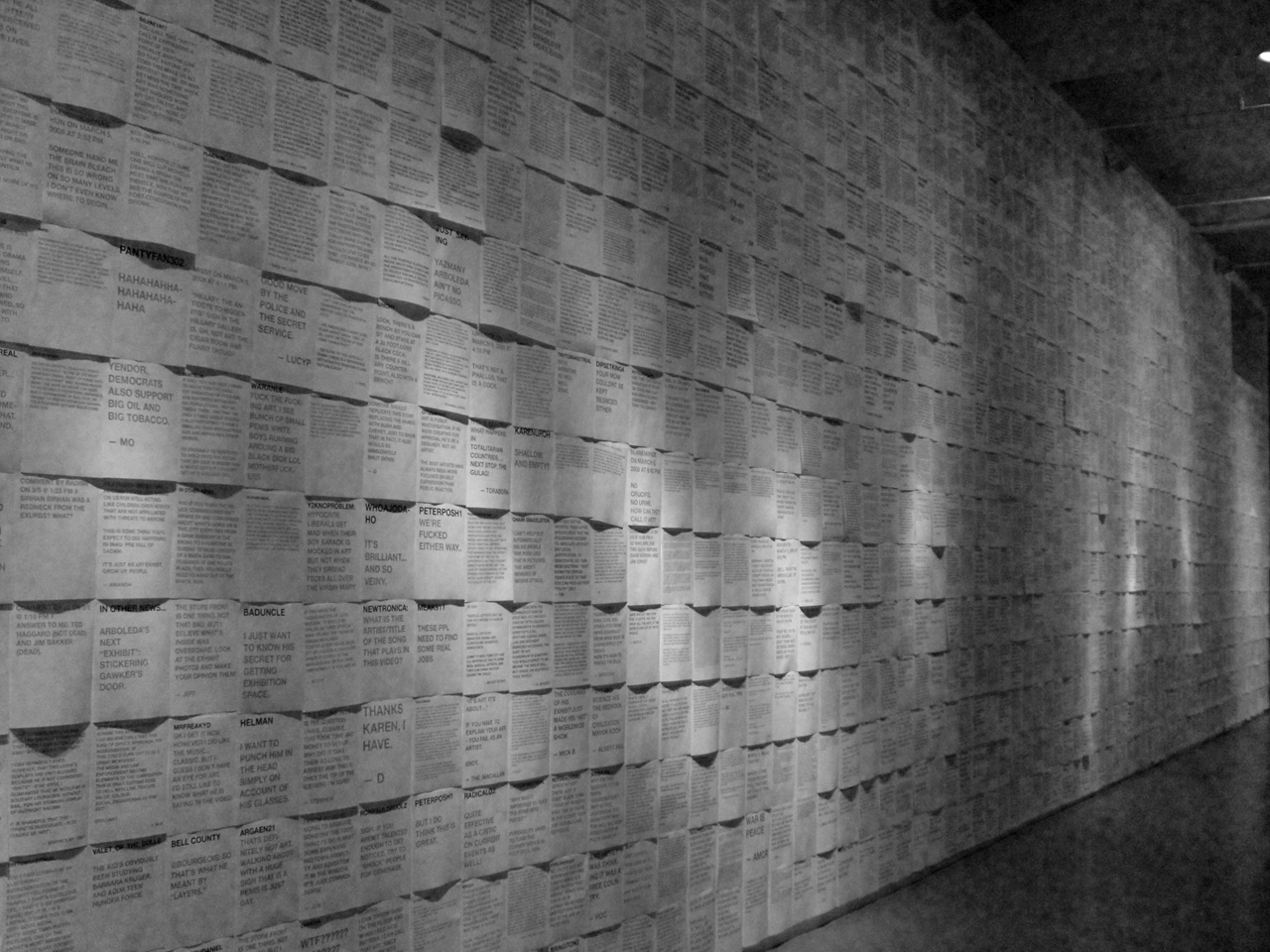
Keller Gates Project at the Art Directors Club in New York, New York, 2008

The Keller Gates Project began on February 28, 2008 in response to socio-political currents in the United States and the New York contemporary art scene. The Washington Post reported that the project sought to prompt debate about the role of race, age, gender, and sexual orientation in American society, and to critique what it described as market-driven priorities in the art world.

As part of the project, Arboleda fabricated two galleries in New York City—the Leah Keller Gallery and the Naomi Gates Gallery. The galleries had websites and listed physical addresses in Chelsea that were in fact empty parking lots, along with telephone numbers that routed callers to automated voicemail messages. The images presented online were based on photographs Arboleda took of existing Manhattan galleries, which he digitally altered by removing artworks on view and inserting fabricated works.

After announcing the openings by email, Arboleda subsequently said the exhibitions had been censored. The episode drew international press coverage, including in The Village Voice. Reports also appeared in outlets including The New Republic, El Tiempo, and Le Monde. The story aired on U.S. Spanish-language television, including a national news segment on Univision.

In the wake of the online phase, Arboleda created physical versions of some of the fabricated works. One work, titled “Once You Go Barack…,” was used in a video invitation for a “re-opening” that showed Arboleda and collaborators moving through New York City landmarks including the Statue of Liberty, the Brooklyn Bridge, and the Empire State Building.

A second wave of coverage followed as a physical exhibition approached. According to The New York Times, bystanders called 911 after seeing signage advertising “The Assassination of Barack Obama” and “The Assassination of Hillary Clinton,” and Arboleda was questioned by the United States Secret Service. The New York Times also reported on the project as an exploration of the boundaries between fact and fiction and the role of media in amplifying controversy.

In a contemporaneous Los Angeles Times commentary, Arboleda said the term “assassination” was meant as a metaphor for “character assassination.” The New York Sun reported that Arboleda criticized the Secret Service response, and quoted him describing the agency’s concern that the exhibition could incite destructive acts such as breaking a window.

In October 2008, Arboleda presented a one-month exhibition at the Art Directors Club Gallery in New York documenting the project’s production process. For the exhibition, he installed wallpaper made from printed blog comments responding to the “Assassination” shows. The Art Directors Club also hosted two public events, including a question-and-answer session with journalist Gabriel Sherman and a panel discussion moderated by Sherman with participants including Klaus Biesenbach, Anne Pasternak, Lauren Cornell, and Mario Naves.

== The New Vitruvians Project ==
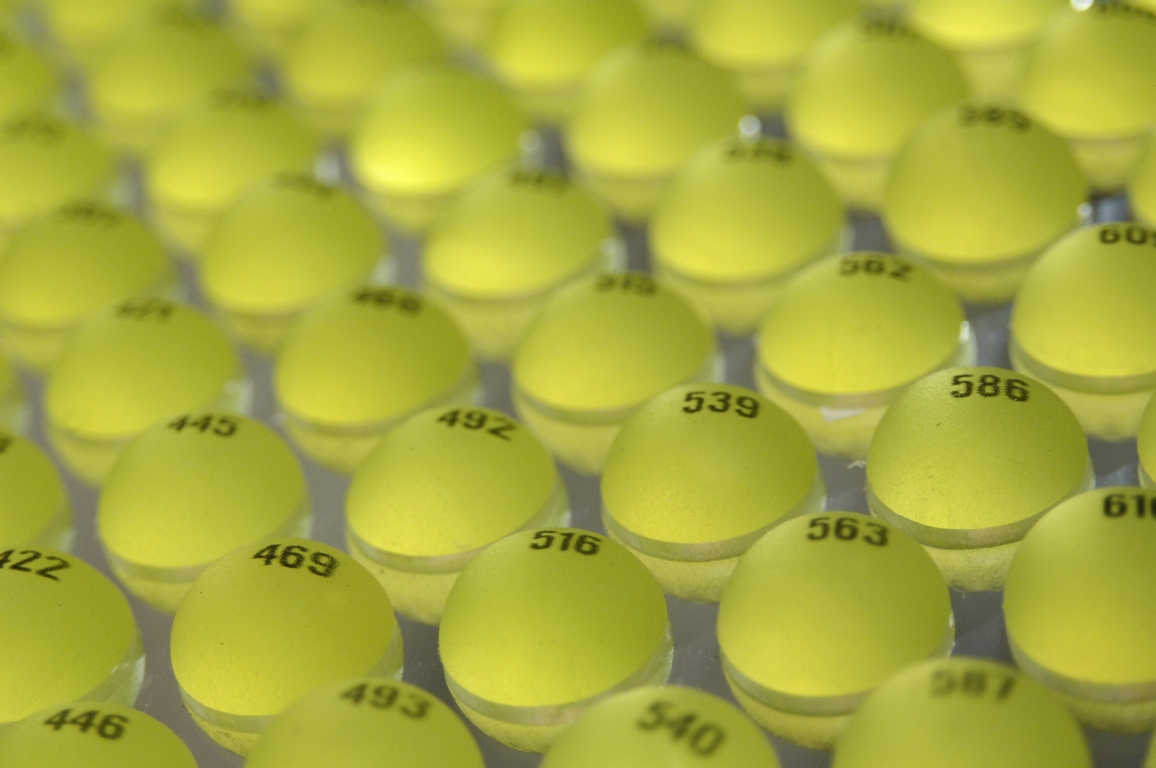
New Vitruvians piece detail at the Imagination Gallery in London, 2008

New Vitruvians Project at the Imagination Gallery in London, 2008

The New Vitruvians is a series of large-scale works examining ideals of beauty and the social and cultural forces that shape them. The title references Leonardo da Vinci's Vitruvian Man, a study of human proportion inscribed in a circle and square.

At the outset of the project, Arboleda photographed men and women selected to reflect varied standards of beauty and digitally processed the images into pixelated forms. He then translated the images into three-dimensional compositions by printing them onto thousands of one-inch spheres, assembling the spheres by hand into acrylic frames to create a pointillist-like effect.

Japanese fashion designer Issey Miyake presented The New Vitruvians, Arboleda's first solo exhibition in New York City, in May 2007. The exhibition traveled to London’s Imagination Gallery later that year, where Arboleda also introduced “ball gowns” constructed from more than 10,000 plastic spheres.
