= Karl Herzfeld =

Austrian–American physicist and chemist (1892–1978)

- Herzfeld (right) in 1938
- Born: Karl Ferdinand Herzfeld; February 24, 1892; Vienna, Austria-Hungary
- Died: June 3, 1978 (aged 86); Washington DC, US
- Education: Schottengymnasium
- Alma mater: University of Vienna (Dr. phil.)
- Spouse: Regina Flannery (m. 1938)
- Scientific career
- Fields: Physics; chemistry
- Workplaces: LMU Munich (1919–26); Johns Hopkins University (1926–36); Catholic University of America (1936–69)
- Thesis: Zur Elektronentheorie der Metalle (1913)
- Doctoral advisor: Friedrich Hasenöhrl
- Doctoral students: Walter Heitler (1926); John A. Wheeler (1933); Virginia Griffing (1947)

Karl Ferdinand Herzfeld (February 24, 1892 – June 3, 1978) was an Austrian–American physicist and chemist. He worked on condensed matter physics, fluid dynamics, reaction rate theory, and statistical mechanics. In seminal 1919 and 1921 papers, he derived the rate equation for unimolecular reactions and proposed the Lindemann mechanism of third-body deactivation in unimolecular reactions. In 1927, he was the first to quantify when a substance is a metal or an insulator. The Goldhammer–Herzfeld criterion to classify metalloids is named after him. Herzfeld and Frank O. Rice developed the theory of translational-vibrational energy transfer, and proposed the radical mechanism for pyrolysis in 1934, known as the Rice–Herzfeld mechanism.

Herzfeld also wrote on philosophy and theology. He was married to anthropologist Regina Flannery.

== Education ==
Karl Ferdinand Herzfeld was born on February 24, 1892, in Vienna, into a "prominent, recently assimilated Jewish family". His father was Professor Ordinarius of Obstetrics and Gynecology at the University of Vienna. His mother, Camilla Herzog, was the daughter of a newspaper publisher and sister of the organic chemist R. O. Herzog.

In 1902, Herzfeld enrolled at the Schottengymnasium. He attended the school until 1910, when he entered the University of Vienna to study physics and chemistry. In 1912, he took courses at the University of Zurich and ETH Zurich. It was at ETH that he met Otto Stern; Herzfeld later credited conversations with Stern for his deeper understanding of thermodynamics.

In 1913, Herzfeld went to study at the University of Göttingen, after which he returned to Vienna and received his Ph.D. the following year under Friedrich Hasenöhrl, who had become director of the Institute for Theoretical Physics upon the suicide of Ludwig Boltzmann in 1906.

Herzfeld's thesis applied statistical mechanics to a gas of free electrons as a model for a theory of metals. By the time he received his doctorate, he already had published six scientific papers. In one of them, he attempted to derive a model of the hydrogen atom. This paper was published in 1912, shortly before Niels Bohr submitted his first paper on the Bohr model of the hydrogen atom.

Upon receipt of his doctorate, Herzfeld volunteered for service in the Austro-Hungarian Army. World War I broke out shortly thereafter and he served until 1918, rising to the rank of first lieutenant. Herzfeld's thesis advisor Hasenöhrl was called to serve during World War I and was killed at the front. During his tenure in the military, Herzfeld published six papers on statistical mechanics applied to problems in physics and chemistry, especially to the structure of matter – gases, liquids, and solids.

== Career ==
After the War, Herzfeld returned to the University of Vienna, however, the university was in such dire financial straits that he moved to Munich in 1919, with the intent of studying analytical chemistry and getting a job in the German chemical industry, which had a highly respected reputation. First, he was an assistant at the physico-chemical laboratory of Kasimir Fajans at LMU Munich. However, once there, he found the challenge of theoretical physics more to his liking. He became a Privatdozent for theoretical physics and physical chemistry at LMU, and therefore was much more associated with Arnold Sommerfeld, who was professor ordinarius of theoretical physics and director of the Institute for Theoretical Physics – a prominent organization for the study of atomic and molecular structure. From 1925, until he left LMU in 1926, he was professor extraordinarius of theoretical physics. During this time, Linus Pauling did postdoctoral studies with him, and he was the thesis advisor for Walter Heitler, who got his doctorate in 1926. In 1925, Herzfeld published his book on kinetic theory and statistical mechanics, which became a graduate-level textbook in German-speaking universities.

In 1926, Herzfeld took a visiting professorship at the Johns Hopkins University in Baltimore, Maryland, which developed into a regular faculty position. During 1930 and 1932, he was a lecturer at Cooper Union and Fordham University in New York City.

While at Johns Hopkins, Herzfeld did considerable research with the chemist Francis O. Rice, who joined the university as an associate professor the same year Herzfeld arrived. Their 1928 paper was the first to correctly analyze translation-vibration energy transfer in molecular gases, later extended to liquids, as reviewed by Karen Johnson in her extensively referenced biographical article. At Johns Hopkins, Herzfeld worked with other European colleagues on the university's physics faculty, namely James Franck and Maria Goeppert-Mayer, who were awarded Nobel Prizes in Physics in 1925 and 1963, respectively. Franck came to Johns Hopkins after he left Germany in 1933, where he had been ordinarius professor of experimental physics and director of the Second Institute for Experimental Physics at the University of Göttingen and a close colleague of Max Born, who was director of the Institute of Theoretical Physics at Göttingen. Goeppert-Mayer was a student of Born, and she joined the Johns Hopkins faculty in 1931. Goeppert-Mayer and Herzfeld published articles on states of aggregation and nuclear fusion reactions. Herzfeld coauthored articles with Franck on photosynthesis, one being after they had both left Johns Hopkins. John Archibald Wheeler, who in turn advised Richard Feynman, obtained his PhD under the guidance of Herzfeld in 1933.

In 1936, Herzfeld moved to The Catholic University of America in Washington, D.C., where he lived until his death in 1978. He received emeritus status in 1969 and stayed active for the rest of his life.

Reasons for Herzfeld leaving Johns Hopkins were described in a letter to Arnold Sommerfeld. A main reason was the dire financial situation at Johns Hopkins. However, there were other reasons as well. One being his relationship with R. W. Wood, a professor of experimental physics and chairman of the physics department, had deteriorated. Also, J. A. Bearden, another experimentalist, thought there was too much emphasis on theoretical physics and the number of German physicists in the small department was out of balance. Bearden also suspected that Herzfeld had brought Franck to Johns Hopkins to further Herzfeld's ambitions to be department chairman. Finally too, Bearden thought Herzfeld had caused dissension in the department over his strong support to promote Göppert-Mayer from research associate in physics to a regular faculty appointment. While Herzfeld did receive offers from both Fordham University and Catholic University, neither was appealing as they did not have strong research departments. While talking the situation over with Isaiah Bowman, president of Johns Hopkins, it became clear that the financial difficulties at Johns Hopkins might require downsizing the physics faculty. With this in mind, Herzfeld accepted the offer from Catholic University. Herzfeld's teaching responsibilities and salary at Catholic University were about the same as that at Johns Hopkins, but there were additional administrative duties, as he was also chairman of the physics department.

In the late 1940s, Herzfeld increased the attention at Catholic University to quantum-mechanical calculations on the electronic structure of polyatomic molecules, thus establishing a respected position for the university in this field. One of his doctoral students at Catholic was Virginia Griffing, the first woman on the faculty of the university's physics department.

In 1959, Herzfeld and Theodore A. Litovitz collaborated on a book, in part, summarizing Herzfeld's thinking on ultrasonics over the 30 plus years since his article with F. O. Rice. In 1966, Herzfeld published a review article summarizing 50 years of developments in physical ultrasonics.

== Personal life ==
In 1938, Herzfeld married Regina Flannery, who was an instructor of anthropology at Catholic University. By the time she retired in 1970, she had risen to professor and the first woman to head that department.

Herzfeld was a Catholic who had a profound interest in Catholic theology. He received the James Cardinal Gibbons Medal for his contributions to the United States, the Catholic Church, and The Catholic University of America.

== Honors ==
- 1958 – Elected to the American Academy of Arts and Sciences
- 1960 – Elected to the National Academy of Sciences
- 1964 – US Navy's Meritorious Service Citation for his services during World War II

== Publications ==
=== Articles ===
- Herzfeld, Karl F. (1912). "Über ein Atommodell, das die Balmer'sche Wasserstoffserie aussendet". Sitzungsberichte der Koniglichen Akademie der Wissenschaften Wien. 121 (2a): 593–601.
- Herzfeld, Karl F. (1913). "Zur Elektronentheorie der Metalle". Annalen der Physik. 4 (41): 27–52. [Herzfeld's doctoral dissertation at Vienna University under the direction of Professor Friedrich Hasenöhrl]
- Herzfeld, Karl F. (1927). "On Atomic Properties Which Make an Element a Metal". Physical Review. 29: 701–705.
- Herzfeld, Karl F.; Rice, F. O. (1928). "Dispersion and absorption of high-frequency sound waves". Physical Review. 31: 691–95.
- Herzfeld, Karl F.; Goeppert-Mayer, Maria (1934). "On the states of aggregation". Journal of Chemical Physics. 2: 38–45.
- Rice, F. O.; Herzfeld, Karl F. (1934). "The Thermal Decomposition of Organic Compounds from the Standpoint of Free Radicals. VI. The Mechanism of Some Chain Reactions". J. Am. Chem. Soc. 56: 284–289. doi:10.1021/ja01317a006.
- Herzfeld, Karl F.; Göppert-Mayer, M. (1935). "On the theory of fusion". Phys. Rev. 46: 995–1001.
- Herzfeld, Karl F.; Franck, James (1937). "An attempted theory of photosynthesis". J. Chem. Phys. 5: 237–51.
- Herzfeld, Karl F.; Franck, James (1941). "Contributions to a theory of photosynthesis". J. Phys. Chem. 45: 978–1025.
- Herzfeld, Karl F. (1947). "Electron levels in polyatomic molecules having resonating double bonds". Chemical Reviews. 41: 233–56.
- Herzfeld, Karl F. (1949). "Nodal surfaces in molecular wave functions". Reviews of Modern Physics. 21: 527–30.
- Karl F. Herzfeld Fifty Years of Physical Ultrasonics, The Journal of the Acoustical Society of America Volume 39, Issue 5A, pp. 813–825, The Catholic University of America, Washington, D. C. (Received 27 July 1965)

=== Books ===
- Karl F. Herzfeld Zur Elektronentheorie der Metalle (Barth, 1913)
- Karl F. Herzfeld Physikalische und Elektrochemie In Encyklopädie der Mathematischen Wissenschften mit Einschluss ihrer Anwendungen Band V, Heft 6, pp. 947–1112 (Leipzig: B. G. Teubner, 1921)
- Karl F. Herzfeld Grösse und Bau der Moleküle In Handbuch der Physik 1st ed., band 22, ed. A. Smekal, pp. 386–519 (Berlin: Springer-Verlag, 1924) (second ed., band 24, 1933, pp. 1–252).
- Karl F. Herzrfeld, Kinetische Theorie der Wärme In Müller-Pouillets Lehrbuch der Physik Band 3 (Braunsweig: F. Viewig und Sohn, 1925)
- Karl F. Herzfeld Klassische Thermodynamik In Handbuch der Physik 1st ed., Band 9, pp. 1–140 (Berlin, Springer-Verlag, 1926)
- Karl F. Herzfeld and K. L. Wolf Absorption und dispersion In Handbuch der Physik 1st ed., Band 20, pp. 480–634 (Berlin: Springer-Verlag, 1928)
- Karl F. Herzfeld Gittertheorie der festen Körper In Handbuch der Experimental Physik Band 7, eds. W. Wien and F. Harms, pp. 325–422 (Leipzig: Akademische Verlagsgesellschaft, 1928)
- Karl F. Herzfeld and H. M. Smallwood The kinetic theory of gases and liquids In A Treatise on Physical Chemistry 2nd ed., vol. 1, ed. H. S. Taylor, pp. 73–217 (New York: Van Nostrand, 1931)
- Karl F. Herzfeld and H. M. Smallwood Imperfect gases and the liquid state In A Treatise on Physical Chemistry 2nd ed., vol. 1, ed. H. S. Taylor, pp. 219–250 (New York: Van Nostrand, 1931)
- Karl F. Herzfeld Relaxation phenomena in gases In Thermodynamics and Physics of Matter vol. 1, ed. F. Rossini, pp. 646–735 (Princeton, N.J.: Princeton University Press, 1955)
- Karl F. Herzfeld and V. Griffing Fundamental physics of gases In Thermodynamics and Physics of Matter vol. 1, ed. F. Rossini, pp. 111–176 (Princeton, N.J.: Princeton University Press, 1955)
- Karl F. Herzfeld and Theodore A. Litovitz Absorption and Dispersion of Ultrasonic Waves. Pure and Applied Physics Volume 7, (Academic Press, 1959)
- Karl F. Herzfeld Fundamental Physics of Gases (Princeton University Press, 1961)
- Karl F. Herzfeld Questions in Statistical Mechanics: Some Reactionary Viewpoints by Karl F Herzfeld (Center for Theoretical Studies, University of Miami, 1971)
