= Theodore Litovitz =

American physicist

Theodore Aaron Litovitz (October 14, 1923 – May 1, 2006) was physics professor at The Catholic University of America and a prolific inventor.

His inventions include a method to safely store nuclear waste, an electronic chip (EMX Biochip) to shield cell phone users from harmful electromagnetic radiation, and some of the early fiber optics now used in telecommunications. Litovitz held 25 patents, and was the co-founder of Catholic University's Vitreous State Laboratory, where students used vitrification to immobilize radioactive waste. The process he pioneered is expected to save 20 years and $20 billion in cleanup costs at the government's Hanford Nuclear Reservation alone.

During the Vietnam War, Litovitz developed an infrared transmitting window used in a U-2 spy plane. He also helped develop a cheap glass fiber intended to replace copper wire, "a giant leap to the fiber optics revolution".

== Personal life ==
Litovitz was born in New York and moved to Washington, DC, at the age of 2. He was graduated from old Central High School and attended George Washington University before serving as a Navy radar repair technician in the South Pacific during World War II. After returning, he finished his degree and then a Ph.D. at Catholic University where he taught until 1998 and conducted research until his death.

Litovitz and his wife, Charlotte, had a daughter, Toby, a son, Gary, and four grandchildren.
