= List of Sigma Pi Sigma members =

Sigma Pi Sigma is an American honor society for physics and astronomy. It was founded at Davidson College in Davidson, North Carolina on December 11, 1921. It became a member of the Association of College Honor Societies in 1949. Following are some of the notable members of Sigma Pi Sigma.

== Academia ==
- Robert Ashford, law professor at the Syracuse University College of Law
- Stanley S. Ballard, chairman of the Physics Department at Tufts University and the University of Florida
- Vernon D. Crawford, professor, dean, and later interim president at the Georgia Institute of Technology
- Bascom S. Deaver, physicist and professor at the University of Virginia
- Homer L. Dodge, president of Norwich University; chair of the Department of Physics and dean of the Graduate school at the University of Oklahoma
- Virginia Griffing, first woman on the faculty of the physics and chemistry departments at Catholic University of America
- James P. Hamilton, professor in chemistry at the University of Wisconsin–Platteville
- Lawrence Paul Horwitz, physicist, mathematician, and professor at the University of Geneva, University of Denver
- Vivian Annabelle Johnson, physicist and professor at Purdue University
- Jean Krisch, theoretical cosmologist and astrophysicist at the University of Michigan
- Dan Lubin, research physicist and senior lecturer at the Scripps Institute of Oceanography
- Floyd K. Richtmyer, professor and dean of the Graduate School at Cornell University
- Willie Rockward, chair of the department of physics and engineering physics at Morgan State University
- Lydia Sohn (2004), professor of mechanical engineering and bio-engineering at the University of California, Berkeley
- S. Lynne Stokes, professor and chair of the Department of Statistical Science at Southern Methodist University
- Michael Duryea Williams, physicist and professor at Clark Atlanta University
- James Edward Young, first black tenured faculty member in the Department of Physics at Massachusetts Institute of Technology

== Astronauts ==
- Stephen Bowen, United States Navy submariner and a NASA astronaut
- Timothy Creamer, NASA flight director and astronaut
- Roger K. Crouch, NASA astronaut who was the payload specialist on two Space Shuttle missions
- Walter Cunningham, NASA astronaut who was the lunar module pilot on the Apollo 7 mission
- Steven Hawley, NASA astronaut who flew on five Space Shuttle flights
- Kathryn C. Thornton, NASA astronaut

== Astronomy ==
- Alan Hale, astronomer, co-discoverer of Comet Hale–Bopp
- Robert Hurt, astronomer at the Infrared Processing and Analysis Center (IPAC) of the California Institute of Technology

== Government ==
- Michael R. Anastasio, director of the Los Alamos National Laboratory and former director of Lawrence Livermore National Laboratory
- Janet S. Fender, scientific adviser to the commander of Air Combat Command, Langley Air Force Base
- K. Renee Horton (2024), physicist and an Airworthiness Deputy at NASA
- W. Timothy Liu (1970) meteorologist and atmospheric scientist with NASA's Jet Propulsion Laboratory
- John L. McLucas, United States Secretary of the Air Force and Administrator of the Federal Aviation Administration
- Amy Simon, planetary scientist at NASA's Goddard Space Flight Center
- Linton Wells II, Deputy Assistant Secretary of Defense

== Literature and journalism ==
- C. Dean Andersson, writer of fantasy fiction
- Aryeh Kaplan, Orthodox rabbi, author, and translator best known for his Living Torah edition

== Science ==
- H. Dean Brown, physicist who worked for DuPont, the Computer Usage Company, and Zilog
- John Call Cook, geophysicist who played a crucial role in establishing the field of ground-penetrating radar
- Tomas Dy-Liacco, electrical engineer and researcher with the Cleveland Electric Illuminating Company
- Rex Geveden, president and CEO of BWX Technologies
- C. Harry Knowles, inventor and founder of Metrologic Instruments
- Yvette Richardson, meteorologist with the VORTEX projects
- Sam Zeller, neutrino physicist at Fermilab

== Honorary members ==
- Arthur Adel, astronomer and astrophysicist
- Hannes Alfven, electrical engineer, plasma physicist, and Nobel laureate
- William P. Allis, theoretical physicist
- Aziza Baccouche, physicist and science filmmaker
- Robert Ballard, US Navy officer and professor of oceanography
- John Bardeen, electrical engineer and theoretical physicist
- Barry Barish, experimental physicist and Nobel Laureate
- Henry H. Barschall, physicist with the University of Kansas, and then at the Manhattan Project
- Benjamin Bederson, physicist with the Manhattan Project and Massachusetts Institute of Technology; dean at New York University
- Charles P. Boner, mathematician and academic
- Patrick Brady, United States Navy rear admiral
- Walter Houser Brattain, physicist who shared the 1956 Nobel Prize in Physics
- Jocelyn Bell Burnell, astrophysicist who discovered the first Radio Pulsars; chancellor of the University of Dundee
- Yang Chen-Ning, theoretical physicist who shared the 1957 Nobel Prize in Physics
- Eric Allin Cornell, physicist who shared the 2001 Nobel Prize in Physics
- John P. Craven, chief scientist of the Special Projects Office of the United States Navy
- Karl K. Darrow, physicist with Western Electric and Bell Laboratories
- Persis Drell, dean of the Stanford School of Engineering and director of the US Department of Energy’s SLAC National Accelerator Laboratory
- Mildred Dresselhaus, professor of physics and electrical engineering at the Massachusetts Institute of Technology
- Lee Alvin DuBridge, president of the California Institute of Technology
- Freeman Dyson, theoretical physicist, mathematician, and professor emeritus in the Institute for Advanced Study
- William M. Fairbank, professor of physics and Stanford University
- Harvey Fletcher, physicist, known as the "father of stereophonic sound"
- Sigfried Flugge, theoretical physicist
- Paul D. Foote, director of research and executive vice president of the Gulf Research & Development; Assistant Secretary of Defense for Research and Engineering
- Felice Frankel, scientific photographer
- Sylvester James Gates, theoretical physicist; professor of physics and Theoretical Physics Center director at Brown University
- Richard Garwin, physicist known as the author of the first hydrogen bomb design
- John M. Grunsfeld, NASA astronaut and NASA Chief Scientist
- Eugene Guth, physicist at the Oak Ridge National Laboratory
- Gaylord Harnwell, physicist and president of the University of Pennsylvania
- George R. Harrison, professor of experimental physics and dean of science at the Massachusetts Institute of Technology
- Banesh Hoffman, mathematician and physicist known for his association with Albert Einstein
- K. Renee Horton, physicist and an Airworthiness Deputy at NASA
- J. Allen Hynek, astronomer, professor, and ufologist
- Ernst Ising, professor of physics at Bradley University
- John Johnson, astrophysicist and professor of astronomy at Harvard University
- Donald William Kerst, physicist who worked on advanced particle accelerator concepts
- Young-Kee Kim, professor of physics at the University of Chicago
- Paul E. Klopsteg, physicist and director of research at Northwestern University Technical Institution
- Serge Alexander Korff, physicist and a pioneer of cosmic ray research
- Polykarp Kusch, physicist who shared the 1955 Nobel Prize in Physics
- Cornelius Lanczos, mathematician and physicist
- Edwin H. Land, co-founder of the Polaroid Corporation
- Neal Francis Lane, physicist, chancellor of the University of Colorado Colorado Springs, and provost and professor at Rice University Lederman
- Alan P. Lightman, physicist, writer, and novelist
- Robert Bruce Lindsay, chairman of the physics department and dean of the graduate school Brown University
- Per-Olov Lowdin, physicist and professor at the University of Uppsala
- John C. Mather, Nobel Prize in Physics laureate for his work on the Cosmic Background Explorer Satellite
- John Marburger, president of Stony Brook University and director of the Office of Science and Technology Policy
- John W. Mitchell, Academy Awards-nominated sound engineer
- Karl Z. Morgan, director of health physics at Oak Ridge National Laboratory
- Lloyd Motz, astronomer
- Margaret Murnane, professor of physics at the University of Colorado Boulder
- Homer E. Newell Jr., administrator at NASA
- Alfred O. C. Nier, physicist who pioneered the development of mass spectrometry
- A. Ray Oplin, president of the University of Utah
- Ernst Opik, astronomer and astrophysicist at the Armagh Observatory
- Douglas Osheroff, physicist who shared the 1996 Nobel Prize in Physics
- Linus Pauling, chemical engineer who won the Nobel Prize in Chemistry in 1954
- Melba Newell Phillips, professor of physics at the University of Chicago
- William Daniel Phillips, physicist who shared the Nobel Prize in Physics in 1997
- William G. Pollard, executive director of the Oak Ridge Institute of Nuclear Studies
- Martin A. Pomerantz, director of the Bartol Research Institute
- Herman Postma, laboratory director of the Oak Ridge National Laboratory
- Norman Ramsey Jr., physicist who received the 1989 Nobel Prize in Physics
- Mercedes Richards, astronomy and astrophysics professor
- Floyd K. Richtmyer, professor of physics and dean of the graduate school at Cornell University
- John S. Rigden, physicist and editor
- Walter Orr Roberts, founder of the National Center for Atmospheric Research
- Eric M. Rogers, physics educator and textbook author
- Stuart Roosa, NASA astronaut, who was the Command Module pilot for the Apollo 14 mission
- Arthur Edward Ruark, physicist and academic known for his role in the development of quantum mechanics
- Vera Rubin, astronomer who pioneered work on galaxy rotation rates
- David Saltzberg, science consultant for film and television
- Vincent Schaefer, chemist and meteorologist who developed cloud seeding
- Roland W. Schmitt, president of Rensselaer Polytechnic Institute
- John Robert Schrieffer, physicist who shared the 1972 Nobel Prize in Physics
- Emilio Segrè, physicist who shared the 1959 Nobel Prize in Physics
- Robert S. Shankland, professor physics at Case School for Applied Sciences
- Harlan True Stetson. director of the Perkins Observatory
- James H. Stith, former vice president of the Physics Resource Center at the American Institute of Physics
- Verner E. Suomi, the father of satellite meteorology
- Jill Tarter, former director of the Center for SETI Research at the SETI Institute
- Joseph Hooton Taylor Jr., co-recipient of the 1993 Nobel Prize in Physics
- Gordon Kidd Teal, engineer who developed the first silicon transistor while at Texas Instruments
- Kip Thorne, theoretical physicist and writer who won the 2017 Nobel Prize in Physics
- Virginia Louise Trimble, astronomer
- James Trefil, author and professor of physics at the University of Virginia and George Mason University
- Neil Turok, chair of theoretical physics at the University of Edinburgh
- Jami Valentine, patent examiner at the United States Patent and Trademark Office
- James Van Allen, space physicist at the University of Iowa
- Jearl Walker, physicist, professor, and author
- Alvin M. Weinberg, nuclear physicist who was the administrator of Oak Ridge National Laboratory
- Carl Wieman, physicist and educationist at Stanford University and Cornell University
- Gary White, co-founder of WaterPartners
- Harvey Elliott White, physicist and professor at the University of California, Berkeley
- Ellen D. Williams, chief scientist of BP
- Clarence Zener, theoretical physicist
