= Keith Jackson (disambiguation) =

Keith Jackson (1928–2018) was an American sportscaster.

Keith Jackson may also refer to:

- Keith Jackson (defensive tackle) (born 1985), American football player
- Keith Jackson (tight end) (born 1965), American football player, son of the previous
- Keith Jackson (physicist) (born 1953), American physicist
- Keith Jackson (politician) (born 1978), American politician
- Keith Jackson (media executive) (born 1945), British-born Australian media executive
