= James Edward Young =

American physicist

- Born: January 18, 1926 (age 100); Wheeling, West Virginia
- Education: Howard University (B.A.); MIT (Ph.D.)
- Spouse: E. Elaine Hunter
- Children: 1
- Scientific career
- Workplaces: Hampton Institute; MIT
- Thesis: Propagation of sound in attenuating ducts containing absorptive strips (1953)
- Doctoral advisor: Philip M. Morse
- Doctoral students: Shirley Ann Jackson; Sylvester James Gates

James Edward Young (born January 18, 1926) is an American physicist who was the first black tenured faculty member in the Department of Physics at Massachusetts Institute of Technology. He was a founding member of the National Society of Black Physicists and a mentor for Shirley Ann Jackson.

== Early life and education ==
Young was born in Wheeling, West Virginia. He attended Lincoln High School, a segregated school for African-American children of Ohio County, West Virginia and Marshall County, West Virginia, and graduated in 1941.

Young studied physics at Howard University, and earned his bachelor's degree in 1946. From 1946 to 1949, he was a physics instructor at the Hampton Institute, while working on a master's degree in physics at Howard.

In 1949, he joined Massachusetts Institute of Technology as a research assistant. In 1953, he earned a Ph.D. in physics, and his MIT dissertation was titled, “Propagation of Sound In Attenuating Ducts Containing Absorptive Strips.” He completed a one-year Post-doctoral Fellow in Acoustics at MIT in 1954.

Young's early research considered the propagation of noise in pipes. He was a member of Sigma Pi Sigma, Sigma Xi, and Beta Kappa Chi. After earning his PhD, Young joined Los Alamos National Laboratory, where he began working on particle physics. He investigated pions and deuteron stripping theory.

== Research and career ==
Young researched and taught theoretical particle physics, critical phenomena, and nuclear physics in the MIT Center for Theoretical Physics. He earned tenure in the Department of Physics at the Massachusetts Institute of Technology in 1969, and was the first black member of faculty to do so. He was interested in the intermediate structures in nuclear reactions. He contributed to several textbooks, including Nuclear, Particle and Many Body Physics and the Intermediate Structure in Nuclear Reactions. Young was the doctoral advisor for Shirley Ann Jackson, the first African-American woman to earn a PhD at MIT, as well as Sylvester James Gates.

In 1977, Young was a founding member of the National Society of Black Physicists. He founded the society with Ronald E. Mickens, with whom he had previously discussed senior Black physicists who became role models for their students. They hosted a meeting at Fisk University to celebrate these "elders", including Halson V. Eagleson, Donald Edwards, and John McNeile Hunter. The National Society of Black Physicists emerged from these meetings, an independent society led by African-Americans who "created and developed activities and programs for themselves".

In 2025, Young is recognized as Professor of Physics, Emeritus, at MIT.

== Personal life ==
Young married E. Elaine Hunter, with whom he has one child, James E. Young III.
