= John McNeile Hunter =

African American physicist and chemist

- Born: January 23, 1901; Woodville, Texas, US
- Died: July 1979 (aged 69)
- Education: Massachusetts Institute of Technology; Cornell University
- Spouse: Louise Stokes Hunter
- Scientific career
- Fields: Thermionics
- Workplaces: Virginia State University
- Thesis: The Anomalous Schottky Effect for Oxygenated Tungsten (1937)
- Notable students: Herman Branson; Rutherford H. Adkins

John McNeile Hunter (January 23, 1901 – July 1979) was an American physicist and chemist, and the third African American person to receive a PhD in physics in the United States. He spent the entirety of his career as a professor of physics at the Virginia State University, where he also established and served as the first chair of the college's physics department. Virginia State College's physics program was one of the first at a historically Black college in the country. Hunter's research was focused on thermionics.

== Early life and education ==
Hunter was born on January 23, 1901, in Woodville, Texas, to principal John Alexander Hunter and educator Mary Evelyn Edwards Hunter.

John M. Hunter grew up in La Porte, Texas, and in Jennings Island, Texas, where his father began developing a ranch under a 99-year lease. Hunter and his brother were taught at home by their father until the sixth grade, when Hunter had to cross 2.5 miles of open water to reach the classroom in La Porte. He completed his secondary education at the Prairie View State Normal and Industrial College (now Prairie View A&M University), where he received a high school diploma and a teaching certificate.

Hunter began his undergraduate studies at the University of Kansas, where he attended for two years before transferring to the Massachusetts Institute of Technology in Cambridge, Massachusetts. There, he received his Bachelor of Science degree in electrical engineering in 1924. He completed his graduate studies at Cornell University in Ithaca, New York, receiving a master's in physics in 1927, and a PhD in physics in 1937. Upon receiving his PhD, he became the third African American person to earn a PhD in physics in the United States, following Edward Alexander Bouchet in 1876 (Yale University) and Elmer Samuel Imes in 1918 (University of Michigan).

His doctoral thesis at Cornell was titled "The Anomalous Schottky Effect for Oxygenated Tungsten."

== Career ==
In 1925, while completing his master's degree, Hunter began teaching at Virginia State College in Petersburg, Virginia. He started as an instructor of electrical wiring and worked as an operator of the college's power plant. When Hunter began teaching, Virginia State did not yet have a physics department.

Hunter went on to establish the college's physics department, and eventually became a professor of physics and the first chair of the physics department. He also served in other administrative roles as dean of the graduate school, and dean of the college of arts and sciences. In 1932, he became the college's youngest dean when he initially took on the role.

During World War II, Hunter trained students in military radar and radio, and was director of an army engineering training program that instructed approximately 450 individuals on critical engineering skills. He was also one of the early leaders of the National Institute of Science, which aimed to improve science education at historically Black colleges and universities. Hunter served as the organization's regional director for the East in its first year, and between 1944 and 1945 he was the NIS president.

Over the course of his career he taught and mentored nearly 4,000 Black physics and engineering students. Among them was Herman Branson, who received his bachelor's degree from Virginia State in physics in 1936, and who went on to become a prominent physicist and president of Lincoln University; and Rutherford H. Adkins, who completed undergraduate studies at Virginia State and later became president of Fisk University. Over the course of Hunter's career as head of the physics department, 65 students completed physics majors and 10 students received PhDs in physics from Virginia State College by 1973. Hunter formally retired in June 1968, where he was honored in a ceremony for his outstanding service to the college. He was succeeded as chair of the Virginia State physics department by James C. Davenport.

Throughout his career, Hunter was a member of the American Association for the Advancement of Science, the American Physical Society, the American Association of Physics Teachers, and was an organizer of the Physics Club in Richmond, Virginia.

== Awards and legacy ==
Hunter was one of the first honorees of the first Day of Scientific Lectures and Seminars (DOSLAS) held in December 1972 at Fisk University in Nashville, Tennessee, along with Dr. Donald Edwards and Dr. Halson V. Eagleson. These meetings were the early foundations for what would become the National Society of Black Physicists in 1977. Hunter later became a fellow of the National Society of Black Physicists after it was established.

In 1971, Virginia State College named the Hunter-McDaniel Building for Dr. John Hunter and Dr. Reuben R. McDaniel, Sr., a longtime mathematics professor and acting dean at Virginia State. The building initially housed all the campus's science departments, and is now home to Virginia State University's chemistry, nursing, and psychology departments. In February 1974, Hunter was awarded with a Distinguished Service Citation from the American Association of Physics Teachers.

== Personal life ==
Hunter was married to E. Louise Stokes Hunter, who was the first Black woman to receive a graduate degree from the University of Virginia, earning a doctorate in education from the School of Education and Human Development in 1953. Stokes Hunter later joined the faculty at Virginia State College as a professor of mathematics, where she met John M. Hunter. They married in 1929 and had a daughter, Jean Evelyn Hunter (1938–2011), who attended Virginia State College and Howard University, and eventually became a research psychologist.
