= Robert Hurt =

Robert Hurt may refer to:

- Robert Hurt (politician) (born 1969), U.S. Representative for Virginia
- Robert Hurt (astronomer), American astronomer

== See also ==
- Rob Hurtt (born 1944), American politician
- Robert Hur (born 1973), American lawyer acting as special prosecutor in the Joe Biden classified documents incident
