= James H. Stith =

American physicist

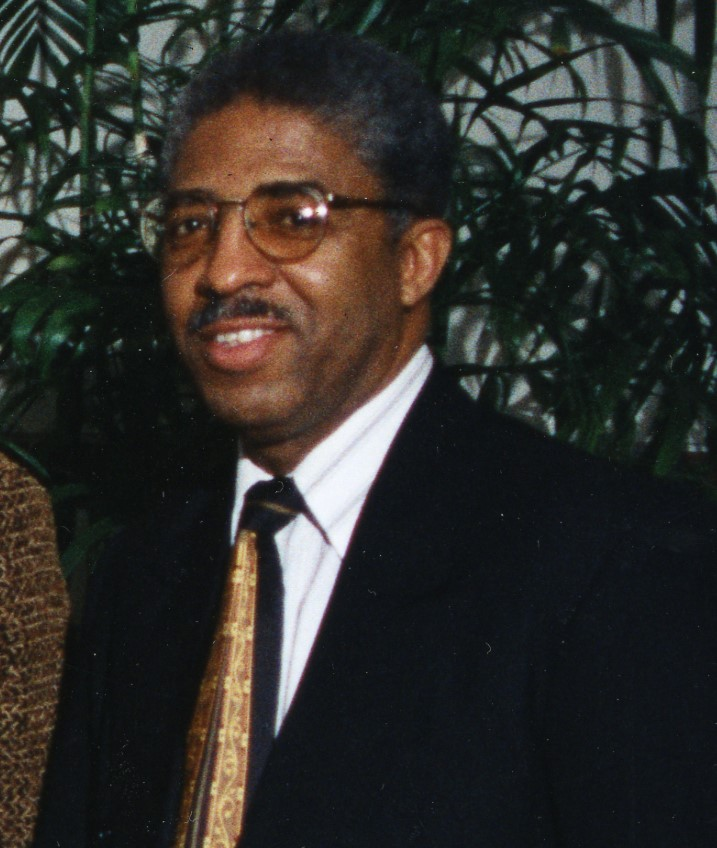
- Stith in 1998
- Born: July 17, 1941 (age 85); Brunswick County, Virginia
- Education: Virginia State College, Pennsylvania State University
- Scientific career
- Fields: Physics
- Workplaces: United States Military Academy, Ohio State University, American Institute of Physics
- Thesis: "Stimulated Brillouin Scattering in Liquids at High Pressure" (1972)
- Doctoral advisor: David H. Rank

James H. Stith (born July 17, 1941) is an American physicist and educator. He is known for his influential roles in multiple scientific societies. He is the former vice president of the Physics Resource Center at the American Institute of Physics, a past president of the American Association of Physics Teachers, and a past president of the National Society of Black Physicists.

== Life and career ==
Stith was born on July 17, 1941, to Ruth Stith in Brunswick County, Virginia where he grew up on a tobacco farm. He had three step-sisters and one half sister. He graduated from James Solomon Russell High School in 1959.

Stith received his B.S. in physics (1963) and M.S. in physics (1964) from Virginia State University. During college he became a member of Alpha Phi Alpha fraternity. After earning his master's, he was drafted into the United States Army, where he served in Korea and at Fort Lewis in Seattle, Washington from 1965 to 1967. Stith then worked for the Radio Corporation of America from 1967 to 1969, before moving to Pennsylvania State University for a D.Ed. in Physics (1972). The chair of the department, David H. Rank, supervised his dissertation, entitled: "Stimulated Brillouin Scattering in Liquids at High Pressure."

Upon leaving Pennsylvania, Stith had difficulty finding a position, so he re-enrolled in the Army. Stith worked from 1972 to 1993 at the United States Military Academy in New York as a professor of physics. In 1976 he became the first tenured African American professor at the academy. He was a physics professor at Ohio State University from 1993 - 1998. In 1998, he became AIP's director of physics programs. As director of physics programs, he was responsible for the American Institute of Physics' career services, education, public information and statistics divisions, its history section and its magazines. In 2008, he retired as AIP's Vice President of Physics Resources Center and was named Vice President Emeritus.

Stith has published a large number of papers in The Physics Teacher, Physics Today, and the American Journal of Physics and has been guest speaker at many scientific events and conferences.

== Professional honors ==
- 1992 Charter Fellow of the National Society of Black Physicists
- 1992 Doctor of Humane Letters from Virginia State University
- 1994 Archie L. Lacey Memorial Award of the New York Academy of Sciences
- 1995 Distinguished Service Citation of the American Association of Physics Teachers
- 1996 Fellow of the American Physical Society
- 1997 Fellow of the American Association for the Advancement of Science
- 2005 Alumni Fellow of The Pennsylvania State University
- 2007 National Academies Education Mentor in the Life Sciences
- 2008 Honorary Member, Sigma Pi Sigma Physics Honor Society
- 2014 Fellow of the American Association of Physics Teachers
- 2018 Albert Nelson Marquis Lifetime Achievement Award
- 2020 Fellow of the African Scientific Institute
- 2023 Distinguished Alumni Award, The Pennsylvania State University

== Professional affiliations ==
Since 1964 Stith has been a member of the American Association of Physics Teachers (AAPT), where he became of Vice President in 1990, succeeding Thomas D. Rossing. In the subsequent four years he became President Elect, President, and then Past President. As part of his involvement in AAPT, Stith has also served on the editorial board of The Physics Teacher and chaired multiple committees. He is a past-president of the National Society of Black Physicists.

Stith has served on numerous national panels and committees. He is also affiliated with the American Physical Society, American Association for the Advancement of Science, and the Council of Scientific Society Presidents.
