= Louise Stokes Hunter =

American mathematics educator (died 1988)

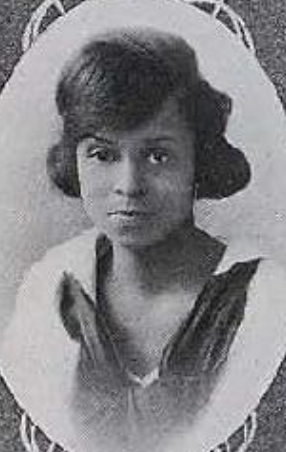
- Louise Stokes (later Hunter), from the 1920 yearbook of Howard University
- Born: Ella Louise Stokes; Petersburg, Virginia, US
- Died: 1988; Petersburg, Virginia, US
- Occupation: Mathematics educator
- Spouse: John McNeile Hunter
- Relatives: Mary Evelyn Edwards Hunter (mother-in-law)

Ella Louise Stokes Hunter (died 1988) was an American mathematics educator who became the first African-American woman to earn a degree at the University of Virginia. She taught for many years at Virginia Normal and Industrial Institute and Virginia State College, two names for what is now Virginia State University.

== Early life and education ==
Hunter was born in Petersburg, Virginia. After graduating Peabody High School, she attended Virginia Normal and Industrial Institute, the predecessor institution to Virginia State University. She went to Howard University, joining the Alpha Kappa Alpha sorority, and graduating in 1920. She earned a master's degree in education from Harvard University in 1925. Although African American women such as Alberta Virginia Scott had previously graduated from Radcliffe College, she may have been the first to earn a degree from Harvard proper.

Later in life, while working as a faculty member at Virginia State, Hunter became a doctoral student at the University of Virginia, studying mathematics education and doing her doctoral dissertation research on the transition from high school to college mathematics. She completed her Ph.D. in 1953, becoming the first African-American woman to earn a degree at the university, two months after another doctoral student in education, Walter N. Ridley, became the first African-American with a degree from the University of Virginia.

== Career and later life ==
After graduating from Howard University, Hunter became an instructor at the Virginia Normal and Industrial Institute, where she taught for many years. In 1921, she was one of six instructors there who banded together to found the Delta Omega graduate chapter of Alpha Kappa Alpha (originally called the Nu chapter), and later she became its first historian and eighth president. On the faculty at the Virginia Normal and Industrial Institute, she met John McNeile Hunter, who began teaching electrical engineering there in 1925 and later became the third African American to earn a doctorate in physics. They married in 1929, and their daughter Jean, later a research psychologist, was born in 1938. Hunter became "known for her mentorship of Black students, particularly Black women studying math". Mathematician Linda B. Hayden recalls her as one of the faculty mentors who encouraged her to go on to graduate study. Mathematician Gladys West saw Hunter and her husband as "the first model of a power couple", and Hunter as a mentor who "still had something to prove, and maybe she felt like she was carrying the weight of other women on her shoulders". By 1948, she had been promoted to associate professor.

After retiring from Virginia State University, Hunter continued to teach at Saint Paul's College. She died in Petersburg in 1988.

== Recognition ==
The annual student research conference at the University of Virginia was renamed as the Hunter Research Conference in 2020, in Hunter's honor. The conference had previously been named for Jabez L. M. Curry, but his name was removed over his historical advocacy of slavery, opposition to school integration, and service as a confederate officer in the American Civil War.
