= Adinkra symbols (physics) =

Graphical representation of supersymmetric algebras

A small Adinkra graph.

In supergravity and supersymmetric representation theory, Adinkra symbols are a graphical representation of supersymmetric algebras. Mathematically they can be described as colored finite connected simple graphs, that are bipartite and n-regular. Their name is derived from the Adinkra symbols of Ghana, and they were introduced by Michael Faux and Sylvester James Gates in 2004.

== Overview ==
One approach to the representation theory of super Lie algebras is to restrict attention to representations in one space-time dimension and having $N$ supersymmetry generators, i.e., to $(1|N)$ superalgebras. In that case, the defining algebraic relationship among the supersymmetry generators reduces to

$$\{Q_I, Q_J\} = 2 i \delta _{I J} \partial_\tau$$.

Here $\partial_\tau$ denotes partial differentiation along the single space-time coordinate. One simple realization of the $(1|1)$ algebra consists of a single bosonic field $\phi$, a fermionic field $\psi$, and a generator $Q$ which acts as

$$Q \phi= i \psi$$,
$$Q \psi= \partial_\tau \phi$$.

Since we have just one supersymmetry generator in this case, the superalgebra relation reduces to $Q^2 = i \partial _\tau$, which is clearly satisfied. We can represent this algebra graphically using one solid vertex, one hollow vertex, and a single colored edge connecting them.

== See also ==
- Feynman diagram
