= K. Renee Horton =

African American physicist

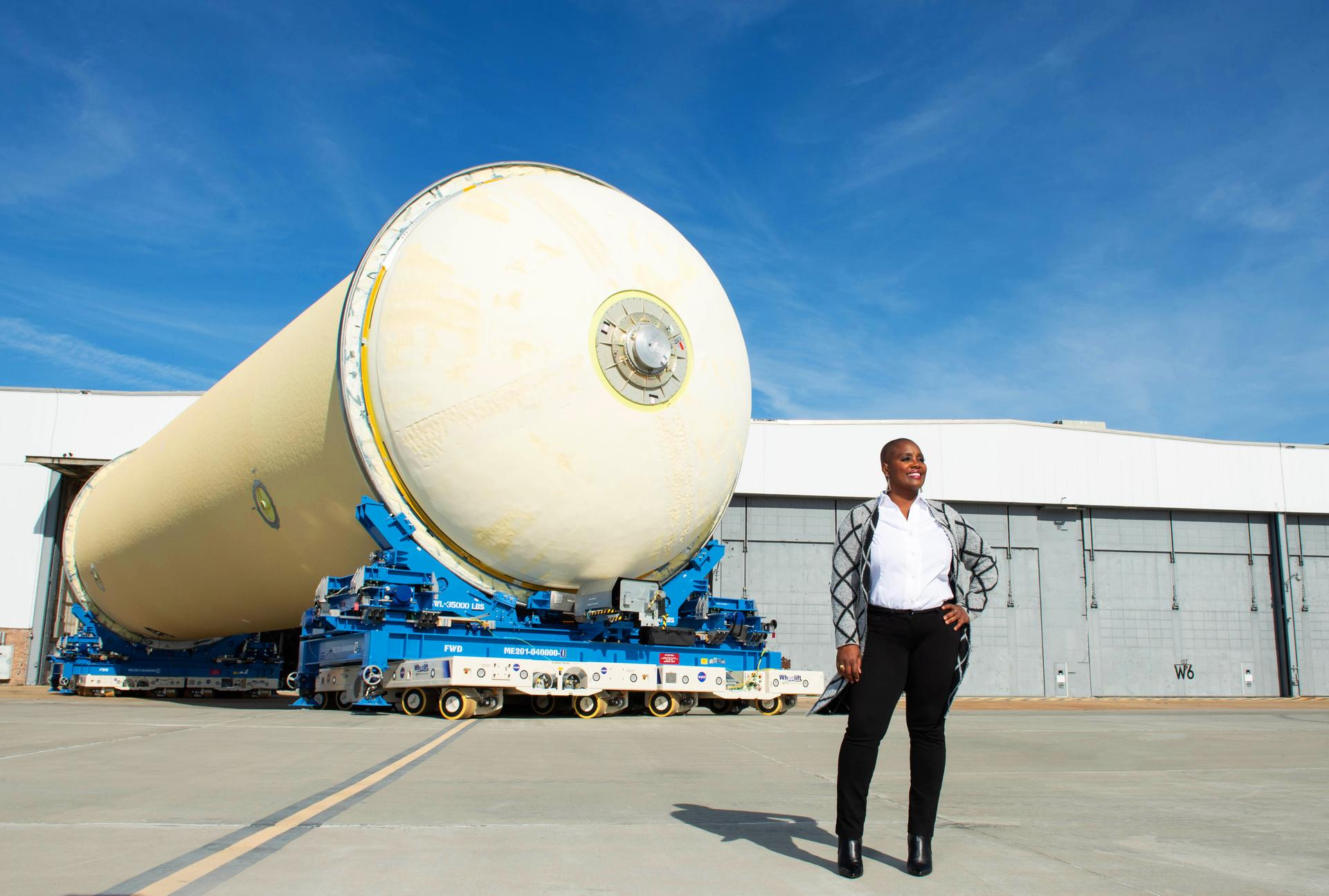
- Born: Baton Rouge, Louisiana
- Education: Louisiana State University; University of Alabama
- Scientific career
- Workplaces: Armstrong Flight Research Center Michoud Assembly Facility
- Thesis: [ProQuest 903971204 Microhardness, strength and strain field characterization of self-reacting friction stir and plug welds of dissimilar aluminum alloys] (2011)
- Doctoral advisor: Mark E. Barkey

K. Renee Horton is an American physicist and an Airworthiness Deputy at NASA. She was the first black person to receive a PhD in material science and engineering with a concentration in physics at the University of Alabama. She is an advocate for black women in STEM fields and for disability rights.

== Early life and education ==
K. Renee Horton grew up in Baton Rouge, Louisiana. Her father worked at a local chemical plant as a technician before returning to school for a degree in computer science; her mother worked as a clerk before returning to school to earn a degree as a medical assistant. Many members of her family had technical skills and training, "none of them was a scientist."

As a child, she aspired to becoming an astronaut. From this inspiration, she decided to pursue science, despite concerns from her father that black people might not be able become scientists, although "he did know some black engineers." An early talent in mathematics, Horton graduated from high school at 16.

Enrolling locally at Southern University, the "Black School" in Baton Rouge, Horton's plan was to join the Air Force ROTC program. This plan was disrupted when she failed a hearing test, revealing hearing loss that, undiagnosed, had dogged Horton for years. Then 18, Horton dropped out of school, got married, and moved with her husband to Germany on his military assignment.

Returning to academia seven years later after completing a technician's degree in electronics, Horton enrolled at Louisiana State University to complete her B.S. in electrical engineering (2002).

While at LSU, Horton experienced discrimination as a disabled person, the adaptive hearing devices she was then using not being sufficiently advanced to make up for her hearing deficits. Then, following her transfer to hometown Southern University to work on a master's degree in Physics, she experienced discrimination as a woman. At both schools Horton was confronted by professors who told her in direct terms that she didn't "belong."

She attended the University of Alabama for her doctoral degree. In her second year of study at UA, administration realized that Horton was "the first black person to go through the materials science program" with a concentration in physics. Despite her NASA fellowship that was supporting her studies at this time, this created tension in the department, and she was forced to switch advisors several times until finding a congenial working situation with UA's Aerospace Department in the laboratory of Mark Barkey.

In 2011, Horton received her PhD in material science and engineering with a concentration in physics, becoming the first Black person to not only work in, but to receive a degree in this discipline from the University of Alabama. She was awarded the Black Engineer Trailblazer Award that same year. When a local reporter called her former advisor for a quotation for the write up, he was not willing to give the paper a quote.

Her thesis was titled "Microhardness, strength and strain field characterization of self-reacting friction stir and plug welds of dissimilar aluminum alloys," advised by Mark Barkey.

While completing doctoral work, Horton also worked at the Center for Materials for Information Technology at the University of Alabama, where as part of her work she led an outreach program for children in Tuscaloosa, Alabama.

== Career ==
Horton was a NASA Space Launch System (SLS) Quality Engineer at Michoud Assembly Facility (MAF) in New Orleans, Louisiana, where she began working in 2012. There, she worked on the rocket that will send Artemis astronauts and cargo to the Moon. As of 2022, she became an airworthiness deputy for the Electrified Powertrain Flight Demonstrator Project at NASA.

In 2016, Horton was elected president of the National Society of Black Physicists (NSBP). Upon election, she became the second woman to hold the role of president. In 2017, she was elected a fellow of the NSBP. She has also served on the International Union of Pure and Applied Physics (IUPAP) Women in Physics Working Group and the Edward Bouchet Abdus Salam Institute (EBASI) Executive Body. The same year, she delivered the commencement address to the graduating class at her alma mater, Louisiana State University. She is also a board member of Lighthouse Louisiana, which focuses on empowering individuals with disabilities.

Horton is the founder of Unapologetically Being, Inc., a nonprofit that supports advocacy and mentoring in STEM.

== Personal life ==
Horton had three children in the period between her second year of work on her B.S. and her completion of that degree, and has written extensively on the challenges of raising three children as a single parent with impaired hearing.

While at University of Alabama, Horton was a member of the Delta Sigma Theta sorority.

Horton has three children and two grandchildren. She is currently managing the band Xcitement.

== Books ==
Horton is the author of the "Dr. H" children's book series focused on STEM topics.

== Select publications ==
- Women in Physics in the United States, AIP Conference Proceedings 1119, 189 (2009)
- Anisotropy Graded Media: Extending the Superparamagnetic Limit (abstract), AIP Conference Proceedings 1119, 217 (2009);

== Awards ==
- NASA Space Flight Awareness Team award
- NASA Marshall Space Flight Center Certificate of Appreciation Honor Award
- Trailblazer Award, 2010 Black Engineer of the Year Awards
- Inducted to Sigma Pi Sigma (2018)
- Louisianan of the Year (2019)
- LSU Alumni Hall of Distinction honoree (2020)
