= Xolve =

American nanomaterial company

Xolve, Inc. is a Madison, Wisconsin-based nanomaterial company that uses its proprietary technology to improve the attributes and performance of polymer composites and energy storage materials. The company is known for developing a process that uses organic compounds or polymers to either dissolve or place true solutions of nanoparticles previously thought to be insoluble, including carbon nanotubes and graphene.

Xolve won the Wisconsin Governor's Business Plan Contest in 2008, and was named one of the top startups of 2008 by Businessweek. The company was also a national finalist in the 2010 CleanTech Open San Jose, CA. The company originated from the fundamental research of then 17-year-old student Philip Streich and University of Wisconsin-Platteville Chemistry and Engineering Physics Professor James P. Hamilton and was founded by serial entrepreneurs Professor Hamilton and Eric Apfelbach as well as Philip Streich.

== History ==
Founded in 2007 as Graphene Solutions, the firm was incubated in the UW-Platteville Nanotechnology Center for Collaborative Research and Development, the NCCRD. Xolve licenses some of the earliest patents on graphene from Professor Hamilton's Group that date back to work done in 2006 and 2007.

In 2010, the company changed its name to Xolve and went on to raise $2 million in its first round of funding. Primary investors included DSM, a Dutch material sciences company, and the Nordic Group of Companies in Baraboo, Wisconsin. In 2011, the company moved to its own labs in Middleton, Wisconsin.

== Nanomaterials advancements ==
The potential of nanoparticles rests on their surface area. However, practical applications of these materials have been limited by their tendency to form clumps and bundles, destroying that surface area. Beginning with its ability to place nanomaterials into true solutions, Xolve has developed additional technology to bring dispersed nanomaterials into industrial polymers and energy storage materials and keep them dispersed. With this technology, Xolve aims to lower the cost of producing nanomaterials, such as graphene, and to use these nanomaterials to dramatically improve the performance of industrial materials while maintaining their standard cost structure.
