= Bascom S. Deaver =

American physicist

- Born: Bascom Sine Deaver Jr. August 16, 1930 (age 96); Macon, Georgia, United States
- Education: Georgia Institute of Technology (B.S.); Washington University in St. Louis (M.A.); Stanford University (Ph.D.)
- Known for: Superconductor applications, optics, computational physics
- Scientific career
- Fields: Physics
- Workplaces: USAF Special Weapons Center; Stanford University; University of Virginia
- Thesis: Experimental evidence for quantized magnetic flux in superconducting cylinders (1962)
- Doctoral advisor: William M. Fairbank
- Website: www.phys.virginia.edu/People/personal.asp?UID=bsd

Bascom Sine Deaver Jr. (born August 16, 1930, in Macon, Georgia) is a retired American physicist known for his research into superconductor applications, and a professor and assistant chairman for undergraduate studies of the physics department at the University of Virginia.

A leading researcher in the field of superconductors, he is noted for his discovery that the magnetic flux threading a superconducting ring is quantized, a foundational discovery that led to the development of superconducting quantum interference devices, superconducting magnetometers, and superconducting tunnel junction diodes for use in microwave receivers. As a professor, Deaver has overseen 26 Ph.D. students, developed two undergraduate concentrations in optics and computational physics, and created a B.A. degree for students — a program designed to "expose students to the intellectual beauty of physics without sophisticated mathematics."

== Education and career ==
Deaver received his undergraduate B.S. degree from the Georgia Institute of Technology in 1952, and his masters at Washington University in St. Louis in 1954.

Between 1954 and 1957, he was a physicist and commissioned a lieutenant in the United States Air Force at the Air Force Special Weapons Center at Kirtland Air Force Base in New Mexico. Deaver began his career as a professor at the University of Virginia in 1965, having completed in 1962 his PhD at Stanford University, under the supervision of William M. Fairbank, with thesis Experimental evidence for quantized magnetic flux in superconducting cylinders. He attended the Massachusetts Institute of Technology as an Alfred P. Sloan Fellow between 1966 and 1968.

Deaver has received a number of awards at the university, including the Alumni Association's Distinguished Professor Award for teaching in 2004. He is a member of the American Physical Society, the Virginia Academy of Science, the Raven Society, Sigma Xi, Tau Beta Pi, Sigma Pi Sigma, and Omicron Delta Kappa. In 2000 he received the George B. Pegram Award, for "Excellence in the Teaching of Physics in the Southeast", from the Southeastern Section of the American Physical Society.

In 2008 the physics department announced the establishment of the Bascom S. Deaver Scholarship Fund, the first undergraduate scholarship program in physics at UVA, "in recognition of Prof. Deaver's great impact on [the UVA physics] program."

Deaver retired from academia in summer 2010, after 45 years at UVA.

== Publications ==
- Deaver, Bascom (1962). "Experimental Evidence for Quantized Magnetic Flux in Superconducting Cylinders". Department of Physics, Stanford University: 178 pages.
- Deaver, Bascom Sine (1978). Future Trends in Superconductive Electronics. Charlottesville, VA: American Institute of Physics. ISBN 0-88318-143-6.
- Deaver, Bascom; J. Ruvalds; North Atlantic Treaty Organization, Scientific Affairs Division (1983). Advances in Superconductivity. Plenum Press. ISBN 0-306-41388-4.

== Patents ==
Inventor(s)	Year	Patent No.	Invention Title
M. Bol, B.S. Deaver, Jr., and W.M. Fairbank	1969	U.S. patent 3,454,875	Superconductive Circuit and Method for Measuring Magnetic Fields and Magnetic Properties of Materials Employing Serially Connected Superconducting Loops
Julia W. P. Hsu, Mark Lee, and Bascom S. Deaver, Jr.	1999	U.S. patent 5,886,532	Nanometer Distance Regulation using Electromechanical Power Dissipation
