= Mary Evelyn Edwards Hunter =

American educator (1885–1967)

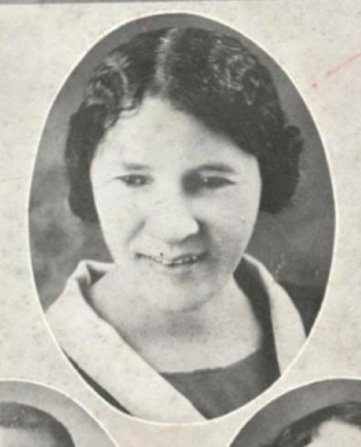
- Iowa State University yearbook picture of Hunter, 1926
- Born: Mary Evelyn V. Edwards; August 11, 1885; Finchburg, Alabama, US
- Died: March 4, 1967 (aged 81); Petersburg, Virginia, US
- Burial place: Blandford Cemetery
- Occupation: Educator
- Children: 3, including John
- Relatives: Louise Stokes Hunter (daughter-in-law)

Academic background
- Education: Prairie View A&M University; Iowa State University

Academic work
- Discipline: Home economics
- Institutions: St. Philip's College; Virginia State University

Mary Evelyn V. Edwards Hunter (August 11, 1885 – March 4, 1967) was an American educator and advocate.

== Early life ==
Hunter was born the fifteenth of seventeen children, on August 11, 1885, in Finchburg, Alabama, to Elijah E. and Frances Edwards (née Moore). As a child, she worked as a bookkeeper for her father's businesses, and taught literacy to adults. She married high school principal J. A. Hunter as a teenager. They both moved to La Porte, Texas, and had 3 children together, including John. He died before the children became adults.

== Career ==
Hunter attended Prairie View A&M University to gain teaching credentials, receiving her Bachelor of Science in 1926. She was also one of the first two black members of the Texas Agricultural Extension Service. With the group, she helped grow the membership to nearly 30,000 women of all races. She advocated for the desegregation of the group.

Hunter often advocated for black home ownership, and coordinated land purchases for whole African American communities. She was also an advocate for adult education, and founded the Rural and Town Pastors' Short Courses, an annual education conference.

She was the first black member of the board of directors for St. Philip's College. She received her Master of Science from Iowa State University in 1931, becoming the first black woman to do so. She pledged the Beta Gamma (later Iota Zeta Omega) chapter of Alpha Kappa Alpha sorority. She served as the secretary of the Texas branch of the Commission on Interracial Cooperation. A member of the Texas Association of Women's Clubs, she also helped found Crockett State School.

In 1931, Hunter moved to Virginia State University and worked there as a professor of home economics. She also attended Ohio State University from 1937–39 for graduate training. She retired in 1954, dying in Petersburg, Virginia, on March 4, 1967, aged 81. She was buried in Blandford Cemetery. Her son John was a physicist and chemist, and her daughter-in-law was educator Louise Stokes Hunter. She received an honorary degree from Texas College.
