= Finchburg, Alabama =

Finchburg
- Unincorporated community
- Location within Alabama Location within the United States
- Coordinates: 31°38′34″N 87°30′39″W
- Country: United States
- State: Alabama
- County: Monroe
- Elevation: 223 ft (68 m)
- Time zone: UTC-6 (Central (CST))
  - Summer (DST): UTC-5 (CDT)
- Area code: 251
- GNIS feature ID: 156345

Finchburg (also Finchberg, Finchburgh) is an unincorporated community in Monroe County, Alabama, United States.

== Notable people ==
- Mary Evelyn Edwards Hunter (1885–1967), educator and activist
- Amasa Coleman Lee (1880–1962), lawyer, newspaper editor and politician
