= James P. Hamilton =

American chemist and academic

James P. Hamilton is a Wisconsin Distinguished Professor in Chemistry at the University of Wisconsin-Platteville.

Following a B.A. and graduate work at University of Maine-Orono, he completed a PhD at the University of Wisconsin-Madison in Physical & Analytical Chemistry specializing in Laser Instrumentation, Coherent Nonlinear Optics, Spectroscopy & Atomic, Molecular and Optical Physics.

He is the director of the UW System NCCRD Nano Research Center. From 2017-2021 he and his team worked on a $875k NASA SBIR research contract for polymeric contamination control that has led to new programs in planetary protection involving space telescopes and missions. His research on astronomical mirror contamination control has brought him to the summit of most of the large telescope sites in the world including Mauna Kea, Haleakala, La Palma and China. His current research specializes in contamination control on precision optical and aerospace surfaces, instrumentation development, nanoparticle thermodynamics and novel electrodes of nanocomposite materials.

He has raised $4.3 million in investment funds and founded two companies Xolve, Inc. and Photonic Cleaning Technologies the manufacturer of First Contact Polymers, which has sales in 77 countries.

He is a senior member of the American Physical Society, a Senior Member of SPIE-The International Society for Optical Engineering and a Senior Member the AIAA (American Institute of Aeronautics and Astronautics). He is also a member of the American Chemical Society, the Coblentz Society, Sigma Xi (Honorary Research Society), and Sigma Pi Sigma (Honorary Physics Society).

== Publications ==
- Bergin SD, Nicolosi V, Streich PV, Giordani S, Sun Z, Windle AH, Ryan P, Niraj NP, Wang ZT, Carpenter L, Blau WJ. Towards solutions of single‐walled carbon nanotubes in common solvents. Advanced Materials. 2008 May 19;20(10):1876-81. DOI: 10.1002/adma.200702451
- Bergin SD, Sun Z, Rickard D, Streich PV, Hamilton JP, Coleman JN. Multicomponent solubility parameters for single-walled carbon nanotube− solvent mixtures. ACS nano. 2009 Aug 25;3(8):2340-50. (Cited 377 times, according to Google Scholar.
