= Charles McGruder III =

African-American astrophysicist

Charles H. McGruder III is an African-American astrophysicist, researcher and professor at Western Kentucky University, where he holds the William McCormack Endowed Chair in Physics and Astronomy. He is a former president of the National Society of Black Physicists.

== Early life and education ==
Charles H. McGruder III was born in Bristol Township, Pennsylvania. In 1961, McGruder enrolled as a California Institute of Technology freshman, and was the second African American undergraduate at Caltech. McGruder received his Bachelor of Science in Astronomy from the California Institute of Technology. Soon after completing his Bachelor's program, he received his Ph.D. in Astrophysics from the University of Heidelberg, Germany in 1972. For his Ph.D., he wrote his dissertation in German, "Photometry in Centaurus", which "spotlighted how and where stars are born." After completing his doctoral studies in Germany, McGruder embarked on a journey across Africa. This adventure led him to a lectureship position at the University of Nigeria. He might have settled there for the long term, but a condition set by his future father-in-law altered his plans. McGruder had to return to the United States with his daughter if he wished to marry her.

== Career ==
McGruder has made it his priority to make the entry of young African Americans into astronomical research easier. He was the President of the National Society of Black Physicists (NSBP) from 2000 to 2002. During his time, he was very involved in improving the physical condition of the African continent as president of the NSBP International Committee. He was a very important figure in the development of the African Astronomical Society.

McGruder was particularly active in the growth of astronomical research in South Africa. In South Africa, the National Astrophysics and Space Science Program (NASSP) was established to train South African students to develop advanced physics skills. The program specifically accepts bachelor's degrees in mathematics or physical science and prepares them for doctorates in astrophysics and related disciplines. However, there were no South African astronomers to mentor potential students. This resulted in McGruder working with other African American NSBP astrophysicists to serve as mentors and supervisors in this program. The following year after entering the NSBP program, the number of black students at NASSP jumped dramatically.

McGruder holds the William McCormack Endowed Chair in Physics and Astronomy at Western Kentucky University. He also leads a group of nine astronomers at Western Kentucky University, specializing in active galactic nuclei, gamma-ray bursts, and extrasolar planets. His department procured financing for undergraduates to participate in faculty-mentored research. He is also the Director of Team Experience in Astronomy for Minorities.

== Notable publications ==
In 1982, while working in the Department of Physics, University of Nigeria, Nsukka, Nigeria, West Africa, McGruder published a journal article called "Gravitational repulsion in the Schwarzschild Field." In this article, he explains that when using measuring instruments that are not affected by gravity, you can see gravitational compulsions can occur anywhere in the Schwarzschild Field.

McGruder III and Wieb VanDerMeer, B. wrote "The 1916 PhD Thesis of Johannes Droste and the Discovery of Gravitational Repulsion" which provides the translation of the concept of gravitational repulsion that was first introduced by Johannes Droste in his Ph.D. thesis submitted to H.A. Lorentz in 1916.

== Personal and social impact ==
In a reflective interview at the California Institute of Technology, Charles McGruder III discussed the impact of various factors, including integration, on his life and career. McGruder, raised in Bristol Township, shared insights into his upbringing influenced by his parents—a doctor and a sociology student—who met at Howard University. He recounted experiences navigating racial dynamics both in the North and South, citing his father's prominence as a physician. McGruder also highlighted his academic journey, mentioning early exposure to science through books and an astronomy club, which fueled his passion for exploration and discovery despite facing biases from some instructors.

In another part of the interview, McGruder discussed the role of the National Society of Black Physicists (NSBP) in his professional development. He described his initial encounter with a Black physicist while traveling through Africa, which led to his involvement with NSBP in 1990. McGruder emphasized the importance of NSBP in fostering a sense of community and support for Black physicists, comparing it to his involvement with the American Physical Society (APS) Committee of Minorities. He reflected on NSBP's evolution, highlighting its focus on mentorship and the development of the next generation of physicists. McGruder stressed the significance of inclusivity and representation, particularly through role modeling and mentoring, in empowering aspiring physicists of color.
