= C. Harry Knowles =

American physicist and businessman

Carl Harry Knowles
- Born: August 15, 1928; Birmingham, Alabama, United States
- Died: January 7, 2020 (aged 91); Moorestown, New Jersey, United States
- Spouses: Phoebe Barrett (married 1954–1967); Ursula Fuss (married 1967–1968); Janet Kurtas Starzynski (married 1972–????); Lucy B. Rorke-Adams (married 2013–2020)
- Children: 3
- Relatives: Hugh S. Knowles (half-brother)

C. Harry Knowles (August 15, 1928 – January 7, 2020) was an American physicist, entrepreneur, philanthropist, and a prolific inventor who held some 400 patents.

== Education ==
Knowles graduated from Ensley High School, Ensley, Alabama in 1945. In 1945, he enrolled at what was then known as the Alabama Polytechnic Institute (now Auburn University). He then served in the United States Marine Corps for two years from 1946 to 1948. While in the Marine Corps, he went to boot camp at Marine Corps Recruit Depot Parris Island and then was assigned to Henderson Hall in Arlington, Virginia. At Henderson Hall, he was a guard and then worked at the recreational facilities.

He joined the Pi Kappa Alpha fraternity. In 1950, he founded the institute's chapter of the Sigma Pi Sigma physics honors society, and served as the chapter's inaugural president. In 1951 he completed his degree in physics. He then earned a master's degree in physics from Vanderbilt University in 1953.

== Career ==
In 1953, Knowles started his career at Bell Laboratories exploring the possibilities of the then-new technology of the transistor. His research focused specifically on improving the germanium transistor speed. These faster transistors were used in Project Vanguard radio transmitters as well as the Nike Zeus anti-aircraft missile system. He also designed the germanium mesa transistor at Bell and was hired by Motorola in 1958 to become their product manager for mesa transistors. In 1961, he became Motorola's assistant general manager for research and development. Here he invented the 2N2222 "star transistor". Knowles joined Westinghouse in 1962 as the general manager of the molecular electronics division.

Knowles founded Metrologic Instruments in 1968, and led it until his retirement in 2007.

== Precursor to Moore's Law ==
At the annual IEEE international convention in New York City in 1964, leaders of the electronics industry argued that integrated circuits were the future of the industry, including Motorola vice president and general manager C. Lester Hogan, Texas Instruments president and cofounder Patrick E. Haggerty, Fairchild Semiconductor cofounder Robert Noyce, General Electric's general manager of semiconductor products Leonard Maier, and Zenith vice-president for engineering J. E. Brown.

Knowles presented on behalf of Westinghouse. His presentation argued that the solution to the tyranny of numbers was the mass-produced integrated circuit (IC). He presented a graph showing IC cost-per-function as the product of two cost curves: yield, which decreases as the pin count (as an analogue of functionality) of the device increases; and a "yield adjustment factor," which has a decreasing cost per pin – assuming a 100% yield. Knowles' cost curve graph was therefore temporally static, but he explained that the yield adjustment curve would move outward as manufacturing processes inevitably improved, thus implying an ever-improving minimum cost per function at higher complexities.

The IEEE published a special issue of IEEE Spectrum, also in 1964, with edited versions of the remarks from the conference. Knowles is quoted as saying: "as the technology improves, the cost decreases […] yield improves, and cost drops." Similarly, Knowles also presented an argument about integrated circuit performance: "speed has doubled every year over the past seven years on the average."

Knowles' graphic arguments anticipated and mirrored the argument presented in Moore's law: that IC transistor count grows exponentially over time. Both were attempting to explain to the broader electronics industry that integrated circuits were the future, and that the subsumption of discrete electronics by integrated circuits would accelerate as the cost-function tradeoff improved. Moore's law was more successful at spreading this consensus, as it was more clear and accessible, with a direct metric (transistor count) extrapolated from real data, but Knowles' presentation and article predated it by a year.

== Personal life and philanthropy ==
In 1999, Harry and Janet Knowles founded The Knowles Teacher Initiative (originally The Knowles Science Teaching Foundation (KSTF)), which awards fellowships to U.S. teachers of science and mathematics, and researchers who study the teaching of math and science in high schools in the U.S.. The foundation publishes a journal, Kaleidoscope: Educator Voices and Perspectives, edited by Knowles Senior Fellows.

Knowles had been a resident of Moorestown, New Jersey, where he served on the township council in the 1980s. At the time of his death, he was a resident of Medford, New Jersey.
