= Quinton Williams =

African American physicist and academic

Quinton L. Williams is an African American physicist and professor. Initially wanting to be an engineer, Williams eventually decided to pursue a Ph.D. degree in physics. He held many academic positions and most recently became a tenured professor at Howard University. Additionally, he provides mentorship and advocacy for a greater minority representation in STEM fields.

== Early life and education ==
Williams was born in Indianola, Mississippi, and grew up amongst a family of 12: 10 siblings, a mother, and a father. In 1990, he earned his B.S. degree in physics from Jackson State University. Afterwards, in 1996, Williams earned his Ph.D. degree in physics from the Georgia Institute of Technology. In 1997, while working on his Ph.D. degree, Williams completed a dissertation titled "Fast Intracavity Temporal Dynamics of an Erbium Doped Fiber Ring Laser", in which he won the Dissertation of the Year award from the National Society of Black Physicists.

== Career ==
Williams worked in industry for four years before transitioning to academia in 2003. He worked in industry at Lucent Technologies- Bell Laboratories, where he first interned at in 1996.

Williams held a faculty position at Jackson State University and currently holds a position at Howard University. At Jackson State, Williams served as Chair of the Department of Physics, Atmospheric Sciences and Geoscience where he taught and mentored many African American undergraduate students. Later in 2010, he would become provost at Jackson State University. Currently at Howard University since 2014, Williams holds the position of Chair and Professor in the Department of Physics and Astronomy. Williams has authored approximately 40 scientific publications and a book chapter. Presently, his research interests encompass nanomaterials, photonics, and renewable energy with Li-ion batteries.

Williams is a member of numerous professional organizations. He served as President of the National Society of Black Physicists and was an elected member of the Governing Board of the American Institute of Physics (AIP). Alongside these positions, Williams also mentors and advocates for underrepresented minority students in physics. He has directly trained over 30 undergraduate and graduate students, along with postdoctoral fellows at his Jackson State University and Howard University research labs. Williams has served on national taskforces to deliver seminal reports for increasing diversity in physics, as well as participated in conferences such as the National Conference of Black Physics Students. The American Physical Society (APS) awarded Williams with the Excellence in Physics Education award in March 2022.

== Selected publications ==
- Williams, Quinton L. & Roy Rajarshi. "Fast polarization dynamics of an erbium-doped fiber ring laser." Ph.D. Dissertation. 1996. Georgia Institute of Technology, US.
- Q. L. Williams, A. Adepoju, S. Zaab, M. Doumbia, Y. Alqahtani and V. Adebayo, Book Chapter: Application of Carbon Nanomaterials on the Performance of Li-Ion Batteries, Misra (Ed.): Spectroscopy and Characterization of Nanomaterials and Novel Materials. Experiments, Modeling, Simulations, and Applications, Wiley (Mar. 2022). ISBN 978-3-527-34937-1.
- Alqahtani, Y.M. and Williams, Q.L., Reduction of Capacity Fading in High-Voltage NMC Batteries with the Addition of Reduced Graphene Oxide, Materials, 15, No. 6, 2146 (2022).
