= Dan Lubin =

American physicist and academic

- Education: University of Chicago
- Spouse: Lorri
- Children: One stepson, Jacob
- Awards: Antarctic Service Medal
- Scientific career
- Fields: Remote sensing
- Workplaces: Scripps Institute of Oceanography
- Thesis: The ultraviolet radiation environment of the Antarctic Peninsula (1989)

Dan Lubin is a research physicist and senior lecturer at the Scripps Institute of Oceanography since 1990. He is a member of the American Geophysical Union, as well as Sigma Pi Sigma. He was a member of the National Ozone Expedition, and also participated in SHEBA. The general area of his research focuses on polar remote sensing and using global climate models to simulate climate change in the Arctic. In addition to a large number of scientific papers, he has written a textbook about the interactions between polar ice packs and the atmosphere. On October 17, 2012, Lubin gave a talk about solar activity and climate change at the SETI Institute.

== Selected publications ==
- Frederick, J. E.; Lubin, D. (1988). "The budget of biologically active ultraviolet radiation in the Earth-atmosphere system". Journal of Geophysical Research. 93 (D4): 3825. Bibcode:1988JGR....93.3825F. doi:10.1029/JD093iD04p03825.
- Lubin, D.; Jensen, E. H. (1995). "Effects of clouds and stratospheric ozone depletion on ultraviolet radiation trends". Nature. 377 (6551): 710. Bibcode:1995Natur.377..710L. doi:10.1038/377710a0. S2CID 4255478.
- Lubin, D.; Vogelmann, A. M. (2006). "A climatologically significant aerosol longwave indirect effect in the Arctic". Nature. 439 (7075): 453–456. Bibcode:2006Natur.439..453L. doi:10.1038/nature04449. PMID 16437112. S2CID 4325086.
