= William M. Fairbank =

American physicist (1917–1989)

- Born: William Martin Fairbank; 24 February 1917; Minneapolis, Minnesota, U.S.
- Died: 30 September 1989 (aged 72); Palo Alto, California, U.S.
- Education: Whitman College (AB); Yale University (PhD)
- Scientific career
- Fields: Physics
- Workplaces: Amherst College; Duke University; Stanford University
- Notable students: Carl Woese

William Martin Fairbank (24 February 1917 – 30 September 1989) was an American physicist known in particular for his work on liquid helium.

== Career ==
Fairbank was born in Minneapolis, Minnesota and earned an AB from Whitman College in 1939. During the Second World War he was a staff member at the Massachusetts Institute of Technology (MIT) Radiation Laboratory from 1942 to 1945. He was then an assistant professor of physics at Amherst College from 1947 to 1952. In 1948, Fairbank earned his PhD in physics from Yale University where "under the direction of C.T. Lane, [Fairbank conducted] research on liquid helium and superconductivity at low temperatures."

In 1952, the chemical bonding physicist Fritz London (co-author of the London equations) was interested in the properties of liquid helium and recruited Fairbank to become an associate professor of physics at Duke University. In 1959, Fairbank moved to Stanford University to become professor to Max H. Stein Professor of Physics. In 1985, Fairbank became emeritus professor of physics at Stanford and he stayed in that position until his death in 1989, aged 72.

== Research ==
Fairbank specialized in low-temperature physics, including liquid helium and super conductivity at low temperatures.

At Stanford, one of his most famous discoveries has been the flux quantization in superconducting tin. This was followed by a spectacular experiment on the free fall of the electron and the measurement of the London moment of a superconductor. At Stanford also he initiated experiments under gravity-free conditions, such as the specific heat of liquid helium near the lambda point, directed by John Lipa, and "gravity Probe B", an experiment, led by Francis Everitt, to test an Einstein prediction which produced results, reported first in 2007.

== Legacy ==
Fairbank had, at Duke, 7 doctoral students and, at Stanford, 47 doctoral students, including Blas Cabrera Navarro, Bascom S. Deaver, Alexander J. Dessler, Allen Goldman and Arthur F. Hebard. His three sons are: William M. Fairbank Jr. (a physicist at Colorado State University and like his father a Fellow of the APS), Robert Harold Fairbank (an antitrust, business, consumer and IP lawyer in Los Angeles), and Richard Dana Fairbank (founder and CEO of Capital One). He was involved in work on Gravity Probe B.

In 1990, International Center for Relativistic Astrophysics hosted the first of three meetings held in honor of William Fairbank.

William Fairbank has been a dear friend and an enthusiastic colleague who has given us with his vitality and originality a marvelous example of how to broaden the frontier of science and knowledge. Every encounter with him gave us an injection of enthusiasm and some new physical insight, every visit to his laboratory a sensation of exploring the fundamentals of gravitation through the most original use of basic physics, and every encounter with his research group an opportunity to discuss some of our most recent results in theoretical research with an outstanding group of experimentalists....These meetings have been conceived with the aim of keeping alive the "Bill Fairbank spirit and to extend it to a larger and larger number of scientists.

== Awards ==
- Fellow of the American Physical Society, 1957
- Oliver E. Buckley Condensed Matter Prize from the APS, 1963
- Fritz London Memorial Lecture, 1965
- Member of the National Academy of Sciences, 1963
- Member of the American Academy of Arts and Sciences, 1967
- Fritz London Memorial Award, 1968
- Member of the American Philosophical Society, 1978
- Marcel Grossmann Award, 1985

== Sources ==
- Obituary from the New York Times
- National Academy of Sciences Biographical Memoir
- William M. Fairbank Papers
