= Keith Jackson (politician) =

American politician

Member of the Mississippi House of Representatives from the 45th district
- Incumbent
- Assumed office January 2, 2024
- Preceded by: Michael Evans

Personal details
- Born: October 1, 1978 (age 47) Meridian, Mississippi
- Party: Democratic
- Occupation: Politician
- Profession: Law Enforcement

Keith Jackson serves as a member of the Mississippi House of Representatives for the 45th District, affiliating with the Democratic Party, a position he has held since 2024. In March 2023, Jackson was indicted for using stolen property after using a stolen log trailer as part of his business.
