= Society of Physics Students =

- The Society of Physics Students Logo
- Abbreviation: SPS
- Formation: 1968
- Website: http://www.spsnational.org/

The Society of Physics Students (SPS) is a professional association with international participation, granting membership through college chapters with the only requirement that the student member be interested in physics and astronomy. All college students with an interest in physics or astronomy are invited to join SPS, with the majority of students coming from majors in the natural sciences, engineering, and medicine. The organization was formed in 1968 through a union of the student sections of AIP and the chapters of honor Society Sigma Pi Sigma and the American Institute of Physics.

== National organization ==
SPS is governed by an elected council and an executive committee. Together, these groups lead and govern the policies of both SPS, and the associated honors society for Physics and Astronomy, Sigma Pi Sigma. The SPS council is made up of 18 geographic zones, with each zone electing a student and faculty member to serve. Each zone represents a section of world, primarily focused on North America, and is represented by a faculty zone councilor and a student associate councilor. Both councilors and associate councilors lead zone activities, support chapters within their zone, and in the annual policy-making meeting of the council. The executive committee consists of the presidents of the Society of Physics Students and Sigma Pi Sigma, the SPS office director, the SPS/Sigma Pi Sigma historian, an appointed at-large member, an elected student representative, and the CEO of the American Institute of Physics. The director is supported by additional staff of the American Institute of Physics (AIP). The directors of the organization, a salaried professional designated by as the Executive Administrative Officer of the Society have included:

Past Directors of SPS and Sigma Pi Sigma include:
Name	Tenure
Erin Lavik	2026
Earl Blodget	2026
Alejandro de la Puenta	2024-2026
Earl Blodgett	2024
Rachel Ivie	2023-2024
Brad R. Conrad	2016-2023
Sean Bently	2015-2016
Toni Sauncy	2012-2015
Gary White	2001-2012
Dwight Neuwenswander	1995-2000
John Rigden	1994-1995
Donald Kirwin	1988-1994
Dion W. J. Shea	1970-1987
Cecil Shugart	1968-1970

Past Presidents of SPS include:
Name	University	Years of service
Vincent E. Parker	Poly Pomona	1968–1971
Stanley Ballard	University of Florida	1971–1973
Leroy Humphries	McMurry College	1973–1977
Hla Shwe	East Stroudsburg State College	1977–1981
William Eidson	Drexel University	1981–1985
Ray Askew	Auburn University	1985–1989
Gary Agin	Michigan Technological University	1989–1991
Jean Krisch	University of Michigan - Ann Arbor	1991–1993
Fred Domann	University of Wisconsin - Platteville	1993–1995
Robert Fenstermacher	Drew University	1995–1999
Gary White	Northwestern State University of Louisiana	1999–2001
Karen Williams	East Central University	2001–2005
Earl Blodgett	University of Wisconsin - River Falls	2005–2009
Toni Sauncy	Angelo State University	2009–2012
Dave Donnelly	Texas State University - San Marcos	2012–2013
DJ Wagner	Grove City College	2013-2017
Alina Gearba-Sell	US Air Force Academy	2017-2021
Kiril Streletzky	Cleveland State University	2021-2025
Ron Kumon	Kettering University	2025-2027

=== SPS Congress (SPScon) ===
The Society of Physics Students started a national meeting of undergraduate physics students early in its history, the meeting was scheduled to take place every four years, starting in 1928 and in 2025 the 18th congress took place. By that time, the frequency of the event had been changed to every three years. The next SPScon will occur in Saint Paul, Minnesota in 2028.

== Programs and activities ==
SPS strives to shape students into contributing members of the professional scientific community with the philosophy that since college courses only develop a particular range of skills in a student, it is important to develop other skills.

To promote these goals, SPS allows students to take part in professional membership societies, receive peer-reviewed journals, present and publish research, obtain scholarships, and receive awards as incentives for excellent performance. Further, SPS supports several publications, including the quarterly magazine The SPS Observer. and SPS members stay involved with public science issues, education, and outreach.

=== Internships ===
SPS administers an Internship Program, which offers select SPS members broad based learning opportunities with various organizations in science policy, communication, physics outreach, and scientific research for 9.5 weeks in Washington D.C.

The Society of Physics Students (SPS) and Sigma Pi Sigma is a partner in the AIP Career Network, a collection of online job sites for scientists, engineers, and computing professionals.

=== Publications ===
SPS and Sigma Pi Sigma, the physics honor society, publish several resources for students and alumni, including the quarterly SPS Observer and the online Journal of Undergraduate Research in Physics.

Radiations Magazine is published by Sigma Pi Sigma twice a year in print.
