= Robert Hurt (astronomer) =

American physicist

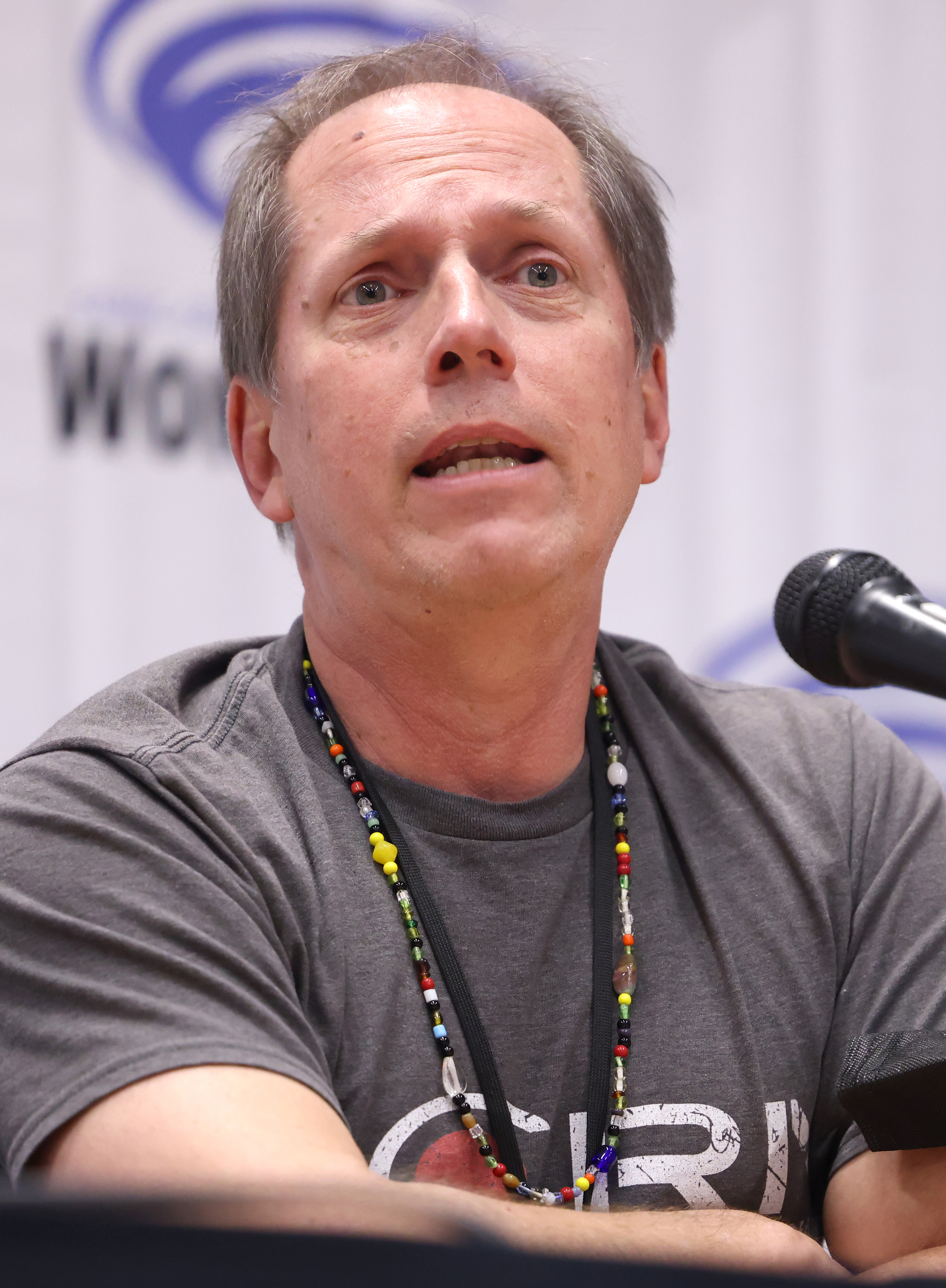
Hurt at the 2025 WonderCon

Robert L. Hurt is a member of the Infrared Processing and Analysis Center (IPAC) at the California Institute of Technology. He holds a Ph.D. in physics from University of California, Los Angeles.

Hurt produced the first published artist concepts of the Trans-Neptunian object 90377 Sedna, from data obtained by the Spitzer Space Telescope. His work has been used by NASA and the Jet Propulsion Laboratory.

Since 2006, Hurt has hosted a video podcast called The Hidden Universe and often speaks on the subject of using new media to communicate science and astronomy. He is a frequent guest on mainstream science programs as well.

Hurt is also a member of the American Astronomical Society and the Sigma Pi Sigma society.
