= Metrologic Instruments =

Automated identification and data capture

Metrologic Instruments is an automated identification and data capture (AIDC) company headquartered in Blackwood, New Jersey. It designs, manufactures, and markets bar code decoding hardware, adaptive optical solutions, and high-speed image processing software. Metrologic Instruments is a division of Honeywell with more than 20 sales and manufacturing sites in North and South America, Europe, Asia, Australia, and Russia.

Founded in 1968 by C. Harry Knowles, it initially concentrated on the manufacture of helium–neon laser kits for academic instruction. These kits were sold to physics teachers throughout the United States. In 1975, after breakthroughs in bar coding technology, it developed the world's first hand-held helium–neon laser bar code scanner. These bar code scanners use a broad array of technologies including laser, holographic, vision-based, and radio-frequency identification (RFID). The scanners help merchants process bar-coded merchandise.

Today, Metrologic Instruments manufactures over 40 different types of bar code scanners used by retailers, healthcare professionals, postal services, and distribution companies around the world.

As of 2006, Metrologic Instruments had over 350 registered patents with approximately another 130 patents pending.

Honeywell acquired Metrologic in July 2008.

== Metrologic world-firsts ==
1969 Metrologic introduces helium–neon laser hobby kits

1975 Metrologic introduces hand-held retail laser scanner

1976 Metrologic introduces programmable bar code verifier

1982 Metrologic introduces hand-held laser scanner with built-in decoder

1990 Metrologic introduces triggerless hand-held laser scanner

1993 Metrologic introduces triggerless wearable laser scanner

1996 Metrologic uses holographic technology in industrial applications

2000 Metrologic introduces CodeGate data transmission technology

2002 Metrologic introduces laser-illuminated imaging
