= Sylvester James Gates =

American physicist

S. James Gates
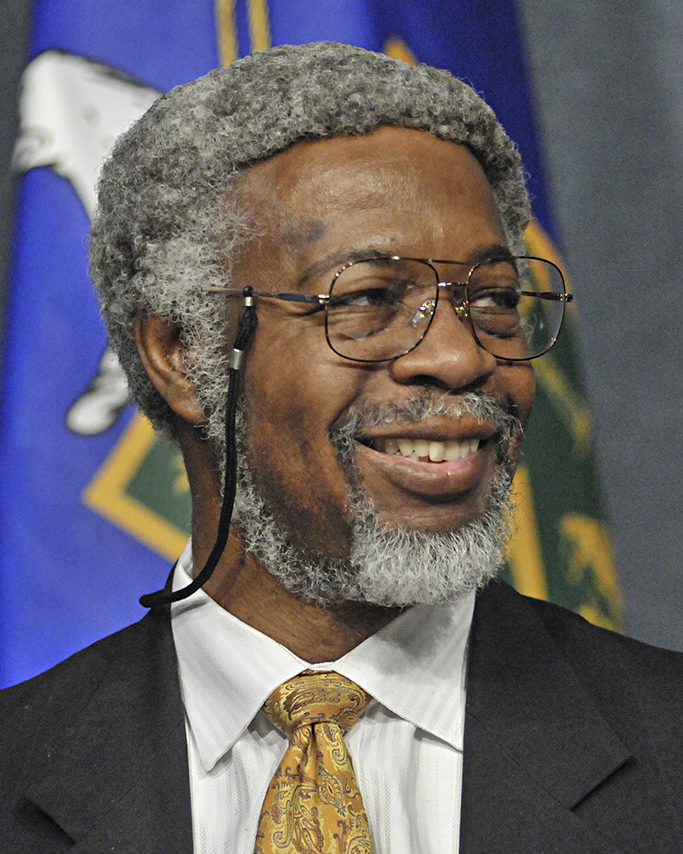
- Born: Sylvester James Gates Jr. December 15, 1950 (age 75); Tampa, Florida, U.S.
- Education: Massachusetts Institute of Technology (BS, BS, PhD)
- Known for: Superspace; Supersymmetry nonrenormalization theorems; Superconformal algebra; Bihermitian manifolds; Adinkra symbols
- Awards: Klopsteg Memorial Award (2003); National Medal of Science (2013); Andrew Gemant Award (2021)
- Scientific career
- Fields: Theoretical physics; Supersymmetry; String theory
- Workplaces: Massachusetts Institute of Technology; University of Maryland, College Park; Brown University; Caltech; Howard University; Gustavus Adolphus College
- Doctoral advisor: James E. Young

Sylvester James Gates Jr. (born December 15, 1950), known as S. James Gates Jr. or Jim Gates, is an American theoretical physicist who works on supersymmetry, supergravity, and superstring theory. He is currently the Toll Professor of Physics at the University of Maryland. He also holds the Clark Leadership Chair in Science with the physics department at the University of Maryland College of Computer, Mathematical, and Natural Sciences. He is also affiliated with the University of Maryland's School of Public Policy. He previously was the Brown University Theoretical Physics Center Director and the Ford Foundation Professor of Physics. He served on former president Barack Obama's Council of Advisors on Science and Technology.

== Early life and education ==
Gates, the oldest of four siblings, was born in Tampa, Florida, the son of Sylvester James Gates Sr., a career U.S. Army man, and Charlie Engels Gates. His mother died at age 44 of breast cancer when he was 11. Gates, Sr. raised his children while serving full-time in the U.S. Army and retired as a sergeant major after 27 years of service — one of the first African Americans to earn this position. Gates, Sr., later worked in public education and as a union organizer.

Both of Gates' parents were extraordinarily committed to their children's educations, though neither had the opportunity to go to college. Gates, Sr. never finished high school, as he enlisted in the U.S Army at the age of seventeen. He later earned a G.E.D. The family moved many times while Gates was growing up, but, in January 1963, settled in Orlando, Florida, where Gates Jr. attended Jones High School—his first experience in a segregated African-American school. Comparing his own school's quality to neighboring white schools, "I understood pretty quickly that the cards were really stacked against us." Nevertheless, an 11th grade course in physics established Gates' career interest in physics, especially its mathematical side. At his father's urging, he applied for admission to MIT.

Gates received two B.S. degrees from MIT in mathematics and physics (1973), as well as his Ph.D. (1977). For his undergraduate thesis he wrote On the Feasibility of Generating Electricity with a Rijke Tube. His doctoral thesis, under the mentorship of James E. Young, was the first at MIT on supersymmetry. With M. T. Grisaru, M. Rocek and W. Siegel, Gates coauthored Superspace, or One thousand and one lessons in supersymmetry (1984), the first comprehensive book on supersymmetry.

== Career ==
Gates has taught every year since 1972. After his graduation from MIT in 1977, Gates accepted a Junior Fellowship at Harvard, the first Black scientist to be appointed a Junior Fellow. He remained at Harvard until 1980, when he accepted a postdoctoral research appointment at CalTech, which lasted until 1982. He was the first Black postdoctoral researcher to be appointed in CalTech's Division of Physics, Mathematics, and Astronomy at Caltech. In 1982, he returned to MIT as an assistant professor of physics. In 1984, he gained an associate professor position at the University of Maryland (UMD) physics department. Four years later, he became a full professor of physics at UMD, a position he held until 2017, becoming the first African American to have an endowed position in physics at a major American research university.

In 1990, Gates was invited to serve as the chair of an external committee to evaluate the physics department at Howard University. After he submitted the committee's report to the dean, he was asked to join Howard as the chair of the physics department. He accepted and took a leave of absence from UMD from 1991-1993 to serve as chair of the department at Howard. While there, he led the creation of a new NASA-funded research center, called the Center for the Study of Terrestrial and Extraterrestrial Atmospheres (CSTEA), of which he served as the first director.

Gates returned to UMD in 1993 and remained there until his retirement in 2017. Just prior to that, he spent a year at Dartmouth as the Roth Distinguished Scholar from 2015-2016. In 2017, he retired from UMD as an emeritus professor and joined Brown University as the Director of the Brown Theoretical Physics Center, the Ford Foundation Professor of Physics, an Affiliate Mathematics Professor, and a Faculty Fellow in the Watson Institute for International Studies & Public Affairs. In 2022 Gates rejoined the University of Maryland as the John S. Toll Professor of Physics, Clark Leadership Chair in Science in the department of physics and the school of public policy at the University of Maryland. Gates is on the board of trustees of Society for Science & the Public and is active in scientific outreach.

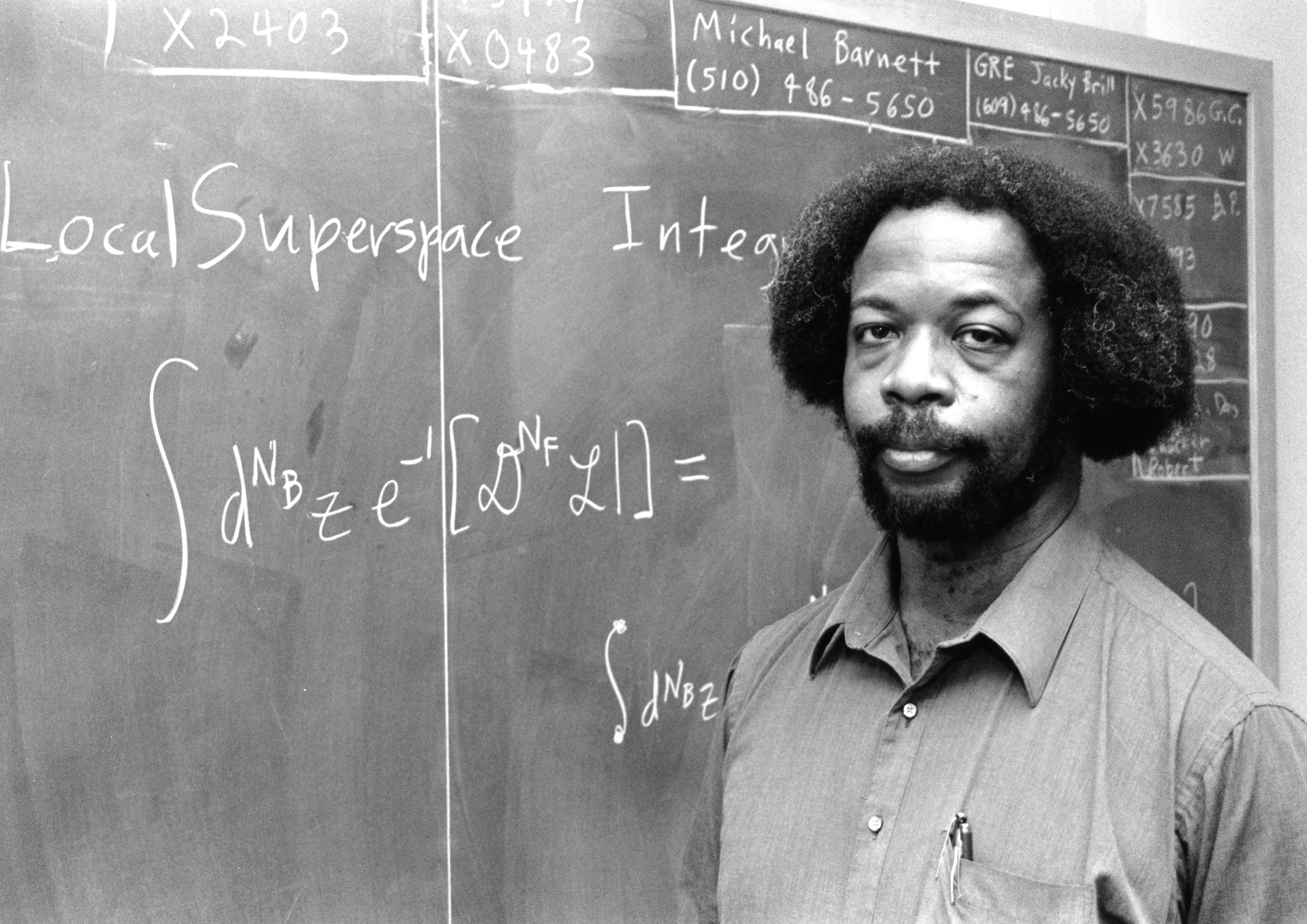
S. James Gates lectures from a chalkboard

Gates was a Martin Luther King Jr. Visiting Scholar at MIT (2010–11) and was a residential scholar at MIT's Simmons Hall. He is pursuing ongoing research into string theory, supersymmetry, and supergravity. His current research focus is on Adinkra symbols, a graph-theoretic technique for studying supersymmetric representation theories.

In 2018, Gates was elected to the presidential line of the American Physical Society: he began serving as its vice president in 2019, served as president in 2021, and past president in 2022. He is also a past president of the National Society of Black Physicists (NSBP).

== Research ==
Gates' research has played a foundational role in understanding twisted multiplets and their implications for nonlinear sigma models, generalized complex geometry, and duality in supersymmetric theories. He has also authored more than 200 research papers

=== Supersymmetric sigma models and twisted multiplets ===
In the 1980s, Gates co-authored a series of papers that introduced the twisted chiral multiplet, an extension of conventional chiral superfields in two-dimensional supersymmetric field theories. Unlike standard chiral multiplets, which are constrained by Kähler geometry, twisted multiplets allow for the formulation of sigma models on more general hermitian manifolds with torsion. This work provided insights into the geometric structure of supersymmetric theories and extended the classification of sigma models beyond the constraints established by Alvarez-Gaume and Freedman.

=== Generalized geometry and extended supersymmetry ===
Gates' research demonstrated that supersymmetric sigma models incorporating twisted multiplets naturally exhibit two commuting complex structures, forming an almost product structure on the target space. This structure closely aligns with Generalized Kähler Geometry, a framework later formalized in Generalized Complex Geometry by Nigel Hitchin and Marco Gualtieri. His work also explored how dimensional reduction of four-dimensional vector multiplets leads to the emergence of twisted chiral multiplets in two dimensions, highlighting deep connections between higher-dimensional supersymmetric theories and lower-dimensional field theories with torsion-preserving symmetries.

=== Duality, torsion, and applications in string theory ===
A major theme in Gates' work is the role of duality transformations in supersymmetric theories. He showed that chiral and twisted chiral multiplets are dual to each other under certain conditions, a result that mirrors T-duality in string theory, where B-field transformations relate sigma models with and without torsion. His contributions have influenced research in superstring compactifications, particularly in scenarios where non-Kähler geometries arise due to background fluxes.

== Bucket list ==
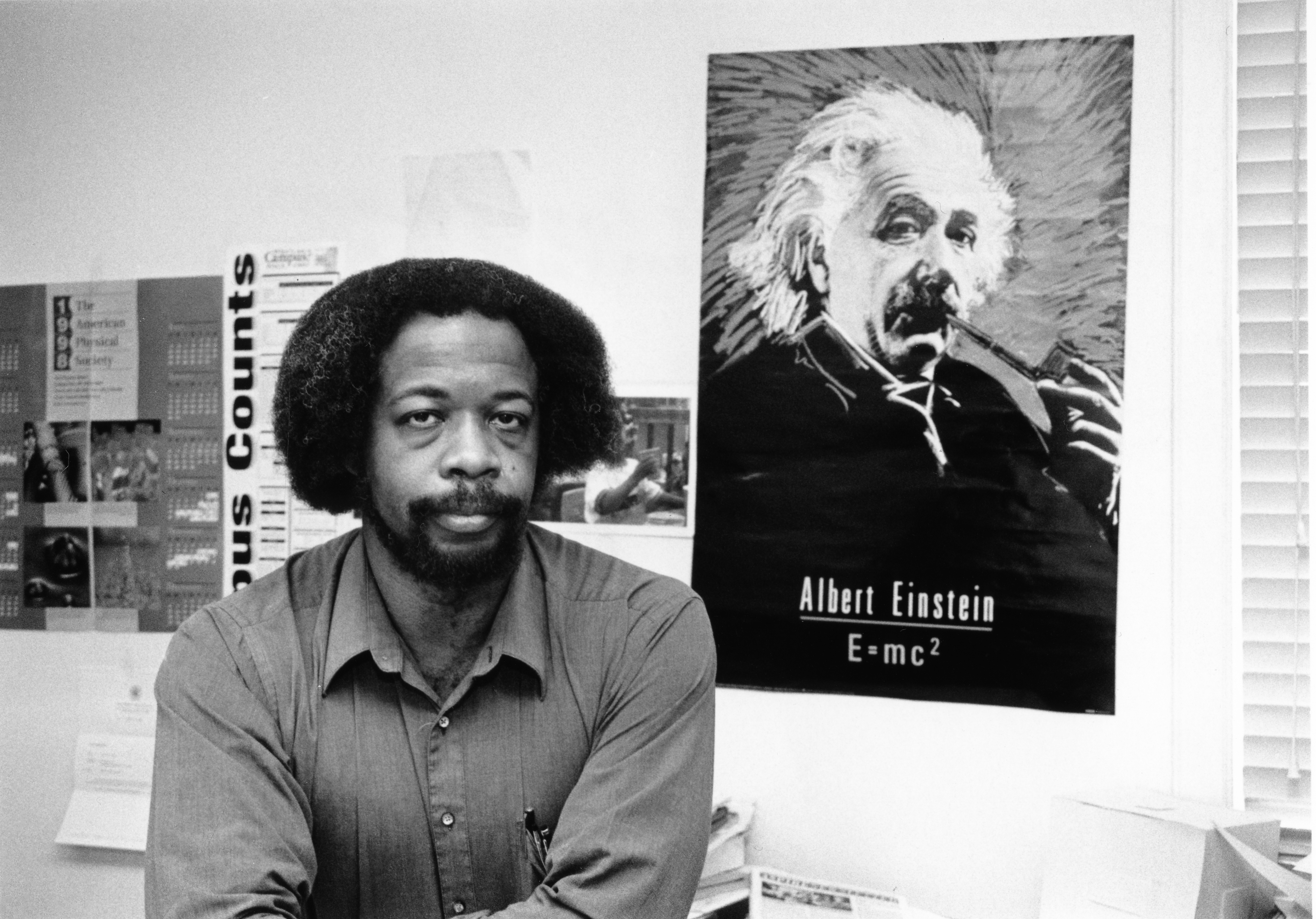
Gates seated with Einstein poster on wall behind him

Gates keeps a bucket list with the experimental discoveries that he would like to see happening before he dies. As of 2025, his list includes five items:

1. Search for the Higgs boson (confirmed in 2013)
2. First observation of gravitational waves (confirmed in 2015)
3. Evidence of superpartners (not yet demonstrated)
4. Evidence of string theory (not yet demonstrated)
5. Classical models that demonstrate quantum behaviour (not yet demonstrated)

== Awards and recognition ==
Gates' work has earned him recognition by Mathematically Gifted & Black as a Black History Month 2017 Honoree.

On February 1, 2013, Gates was a recipient of the National Medal of Science. Gates was elected to the American Philosophical Society in 2012, and the National Academy of Sciences in 2013.

Gates was nominated by the Department of Energy as one of the USA Science and Engineering Festival's "Nifty Fifty" Speakers to present his work and career to middle- and high-school students in October 2010.

On December 5, 2016, Gates spoke at the 2016 Quadrennial Physics Congress, the largest ever gathering of physics undergraduates.

In 1994, Gates received the Edward A. Bouchet Award from the American Physical Society "for his contributions to theoretical high-energy physics." In 2023 Gates was awarded an honorary doctorate by the University of the Witwatersrand in recognition of his contributions to science and his inspiring leadership in the scientific communities in Africa.

He was elected to the 2026 class of Fellows of the American Mathematical Society.

== Media appearances ==
Gates has been featured in TurboTax and Verizon commercials and has been featured extensively on NOVA PBS programs on physics, notably The Elegant Universe (2003). He completed a DVD series titled Superstring Theory: The DNA of Reality (2006) for The Teaching Company consisting of 24 half-hour lectures to make the complexities of unification theory comprehensible to laypeople.

During the 2008 World Science Festival, Gates narrated a ballet "The Elegant Universe", where he gave a public presentation of the artistic forms connected to his scientific research. Gates Appeared on the 2011 Isaac Asimov Memorial Debate: The Theory of Everything, hosted by Neil DeGrasse Tyson. Gates also appeared in the BBC Horizon documentary The Hunt for Higgs in 2012, and the NOVA documentary Big Bang Machine in 2015.

== Publications ==
- Superspace or 1001 Lessons in Supersymmetry, (with M. T. Grisaru, M. Roček, and W. Siegel), Benjamin-Cummings Publishing Company (1983), Reading, MA. arXiv:hep-th/0108200.
- L'arte della fisica superspace, Stringhe, superstringhe, teoria unificata dei campi, 2006, Di Renzo Editore, ISBN 88-8323-155-4.
- Reality in the Shadows (or) What the Heck's the Higgs?, (with Steven Jacob Sekula and Frank Blitzer), YBK Publishers, Inc. (2018), New York, New York, (ISBN 978-1-936411-39-9).
- Proving Einstein Right: The Daring Expeditions that Changed How We Look at the Universe, (with Cathie Pelletier), Publisher: PublicAffairs (September 24, 2019) ISBN 978-1541762251.
