= Rutherford H. Adkins =

United States Army Air Forces officer (1924–1998)

- Rutherford H. Adkins in 1944
- Born: November 21, 1924; Alexandria, Virginia
- Died: February 6, 1998 (aged 73); Nashville, Tennessee
- Military career
- Branch: United States Army Air Force
- Service years: 1943–1945
- Nickname: Lubby
- Unit: 332nd Fighter Group
- Other work: President of Knoxville College President of Fisk University

Rutherford Hamlet "Lubby" Adkins (November 21, 1924 – February 6, 1998) was an American military aviator and university administrator who served with the Tuskegee Airmen during World War II. He flew fourteen combat missions with the Tuskegee Airmen. He came home to complete his education and earn multiple degrees: he was the first African American to earn a PhD from The Catholic University in Washington D.C. Adkins went on to serve in many positions in higher education including as President of Knoxville College and Fisk University.

== Early life and education ==
Adkins was born on 21 November 1924 in Alexandria, Virginia, to Reverend Andrew Warren Adkins (a former pastor of the Historic Alfred Street Baptist Church in Alexandria Virginia) and Mattie Hamlet Adkins.

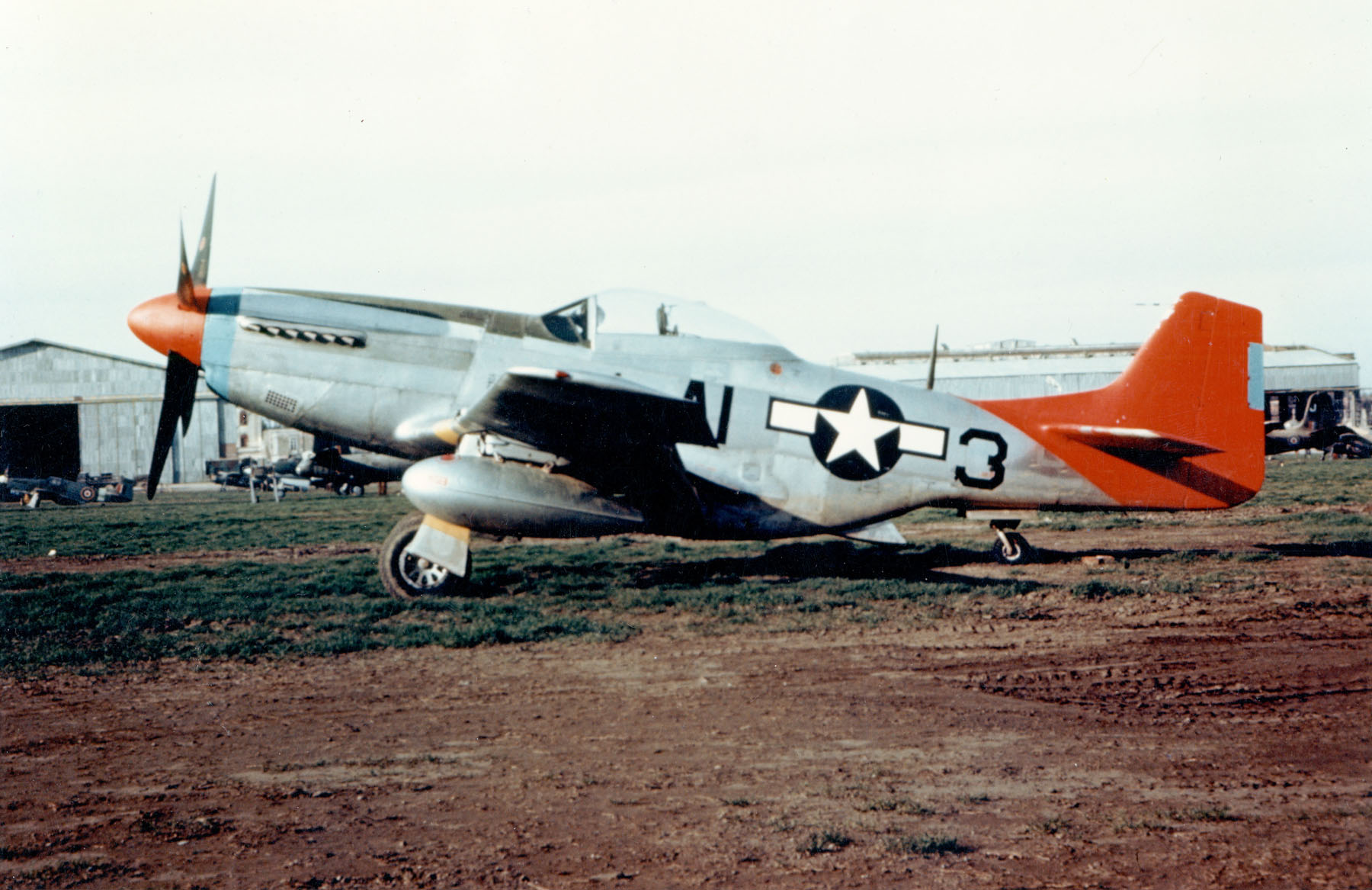
The Tuskegee Airmen's aircraft had distinctive markings that led to the name, "Red Tails." (Note: The red markings that distinguished the Tuskegee Airmen included red bands on the noses of P-51s as well as a red rudder; their P-51B and D Mustangs flew with similar color schemes, with red propeller spinners, yellow wing bands and all-red tail surfaces.)

Adkins first attended college at Virginia Union University, Richmond, VA and later transferred to Temple University, Philadelphia, PA. He was drafted before completing his degree. After his military service, Adkins returned to earn a Bachelor of Science in Physics from Virginia State University in 1947. He went on to earn a master's degree in physics from Howard University in 1949 and was the first African American to receive a PhD from The Catholic University In Washington D.C. in 1955. Adkins thesis is entitled "A Theoretical Investigation of Odd-Odd Nuclei."

== Military service ==
Adkins was drafted into the army while he was attending college at Temple University in 1943. He received flight training at Tuskegee Institute, now Tuskegee University, in Alabama. He was assigned to the 100th Fighter Squadron of the 332nd, and sent to Europe. In Europe he flew 14 combat mission mostly in support of bombing runs.

== Career ==
Adkins had a long distinguished career in education. He had appointments at Virginia State College (1949-1958), Tennessee State University (1958-1962), Fisk University (1962-1976 and 1993-1998), the U.S. Naval Academy (1981-1991), Georgia Institute of Technology (1990-1991), and Morehouse College (1990-1993). At Fisk University he served as interim president from 1995 to 1996. He then served as the president of Knoxville College from 1976 through 1981. In 1993 Adkins returned to Fisk University as a physics professor and later the Division of Natural Sciences and Mathematics. He was appointed Interim President of Fisk University on July 1, 1996 and on February 14, 1997, was named President.

Adkins had an early understanding of the importance of computers for education and research. He was instrumental in acquiring an IBM 370 computer at Fisk University and later became a founding director of the university's computer center.

In 1998, shortly after his death, the Rutherford Adkins scholarship fund was established at Fisk University.

== Research ==
Adkins research centered on theoretical work in the physics of atomic collisions. His work focused on positronium formation, the onset of avalanches in moist rarefied atmospheres at high energy-to-pressure ratios and energy dissipation in the residual gases of a Z-pinch plasma. He did most of this work during summer appointments at Federal laboratories—namely, NASA's Langley Research Center, the Army's Harry Diamond Laboratory, and the Naval Research Laboratory.

== Personal life ==
Adkins was known as "Lubby" to his friends and family.

Adkins married his first wife, Bernice Lee Adkins (deceased, 1967), while in college. He then married his second wife, Jacqueline Parker Adkins, in 1970 (divorced, 1989). Adkins married his third wife, Nanci Cherry Pugh, in 1992. He had two children from his first marriage, Sheila Adkins Scales and Mark Adkins (deceased, 2009). Adkins had one child from his second marriage, Theresa Adkins Lewis. In November, 1997, he was diagnosed with lung cancer, and he died in February, 1998, in Nashville, Tennessee.

== See also ==
- Dogfights (TV series)
- Executive Order 9981
- Freeman Field Mutiny
- List of Tuskegee Airmen
- Military history of African Americans
- The Tuskegee Airmen (movie)
