= Keith Jackson (physicist) =

American physicist

- Born: September 24, 1953; Columbus, Ohio
- Died: 2013 (aged 59–60)
- Education: BS, Morehouse College BS, Georgia Institute of Technology Ph.D., Stanford University
- Occupation(s): physicist, physics professor

Keith H. Jackson was an American physicist, a professor of physics, and former president of the National Society of Black Physicists.

== Life and education ==
Jackson was born in Columbus, Ohio on September 24, 1953. He earned a bachelor's degree in physics from Morehouse College and a bachelor's degree in electrical engineering at the Georgia Institute of Technology. In 1979, he earned a master's degree from Stanford University in physics, followed by a Ph.D. in physics in 1982. His thesis research was in the area of photo-dissociation, and his advisor was Dr. Richard N. Zare. He died of cancer in 2013.

== Career ==
After earning his Ph.D., Jackson worked as part of the Gate Dielectric Group at Hewlett Packard Laboratories, and then joined Rockwell International's Rocketdyne division, where he worked on polychrystalline diamond thin films. In 1992, Jackson became the Associate Director at the Lawrence Berkeley National Laboratory's (LBNL) Center for X-ray Optics. At LBNL, Jackson and his colleagues developed Python-based programming tools that helped physicists efficiently distribute data. One such tool, Py/Globus, was used to efficiently replicate data from the Laser Interferometer Gravitational-Wave Observatory to confirm Albert Einstein’s General Theory of Relativity.

His research areas included ultraviolet lithography, synchrotron radiation, fabrication of high aspect ratio microstructures, and imaging studies of extreme ultraviolet masks.

Jackson joined Florida A&M University as Vice President of Research and Professor of Physics in 2005, and in 2010, he began working at Morgan State University, as the chairperson of the physics department.

Jackson was a former president of the National Society of Black Physicists (NSBP), as well as an NSBP fellow.

== Selected publications ==
- K. H. Jackson, "Utilization of African-American Physicists in the Science and Engineering Workforce," Pan-Organizational Summit on the US Science and Engineering Workforce: Meeting Summary, Washington (DC): National Academies Press (US); 2003.; https://www.ncbi.nlm.nih.gov/books/NBK36368/
- K. H. Jackson, "The Status of the African-American Physicist in the Department of Energy National Laboratories," American Physical Society News, May 2002, vol. 11, no. 5; https://www.aps.org/publications/apsnews/200205/backpage.cfm
- K. H. Jackson et al., "Extreme ultraviolet lithography capabilities at the advanced light source using a 0.3-NA optic," IEEE Journal of Quantum Electronics, vol. 42, no. 1, pp. 44-50, Jan. 2006, doi:10.1109/JQE.2005.858450
- K. H. Jackson, "Harry Lee Morrison," Physics Today, 1 August 2002; vol. 55, no. 8, pp. 69–70. https://doi.org/10.1063/1.1510296
- K.H. Jackson et al., "Ultra-high accuracy optical testing: creating diffraction-limited short-wavelength optical systems", Proc. SPIE 5900, Optics for EUV, X-Ray, and Gamma-Ray Astronomy II, 59000G (8 September 2005); https://doi.org/10.1117/12.618066
- K.H. Jackson et al., "EUV interferometry of the 0.3-NA MET optic", Proc. SPIE 5037, Emerging Lithographic Technologies VII, (16 June 2003); https://doi.org/10.1117/12.484735
- K.H. Jackson et al., "At-wavelength testing of optics for EUV", Proc. SPIE 2437, Electron-Beam, X-Ray, EUV, and Ion-Beam Submicrometer Lithographies for Manufacturing V, (19 May 1995); https://doi.org/10.1117/12.209172
