= James C. Davenport =

American physicist

James Clinton Davenport
- Born: 1938 (age 87–88); Union Springs, Alabama
- Education: Tuskegee University (B.S.); Howard University (M.S., PhD)
- Scientific career
- Workplaces: Virginia State University

James Clinton Davenport (born 1938) is an American physicist and physics professor. He specializes in condensed matter physics and is known for his contributions to physics education. He is one of the founders of the National Society of Black Physicists (NSBP).

== Early life and education ==
James Davenport was born in Union Springs, Alabama in 1938. He earned a bachelor's degree in secondary education from Tuskegee University in 1958, and a master's and doctorate degree in physics from Howard University in 1960 and 1965, respectively. During the summers of 1960–1964, he visited Petersburg, Virginia with the National Science Foundation to teach educators at Virginia State College (now Virginia State University).

== Career ==
Davenport began working at Virginia State University in 1968 as the head of the physics department. He worked there until 2003. He prioritized mentorship and teaching first-year physics courses during his time at Virginia State, encouraging students to pursue science degrees. He served as the program coordinator of Fermilab's summer student program from 1971 to 2014. The White House awarded Davenport the Initiative Faculty Award for Excellence in Science and Technology in 1988 for his work with students at an HBCU. Other awards Davenport received include the Army Commendation Medal for Outstanding Work in Solid State Physics, and the Commonwealth of Virginia Outstanding Faculty Award of 1994 for Excellence in Teaching, Research, and Public Service.

Davenport also conducted research in his career as a physicist. At VSU, he worked for NASA on research related to medium-energy physics and muon spin spectroscopy. He was a co-principal investigator on another NASA-supported research effort studying the radiation damage in solar-cell materials.

=== Involvement in the National Society of Black Physicists ===
Davenport was one of the earliest officers of the NSBP. In April 1977, when the NSBP was first inaugurated, Davenport served as one of the first two officers of Society; Walter E. Massey was the interim president and Davenport was the interim treasurer. Almost a year later in March 1978, Davenport was elected as a full-time executive committee member

=== Involvement in the American Physical Society ===
Davenport was an active member of the American Physical Society (APS), and participated on numerous APS committees, including the Education Committee, the Committee on Minorities, the selection committee for the APS Industrial Summer Intern Program, and the Committee on the Status of Women in Physics. In 1985, the then-Director of APS, Robert R. Wilson, wrote a letter of formal recognition to Davenport which thanked him for his many contributions to the society and to the physics community, in general.
