= National Society of Black Physicists =

Non-profit professional organization

The National Society of Black Physicists (NSBP), established in the United States in 1977, is a non-profit professional organization with the goal to promote the professional well-being of African Diaspora physicists and physics students within the international scientific community and the world community at large.

== History ==
A group of involved physicists met at Fisk University in 1972 to honor three well known African-American physicists: Dr. Donald Edwards, Dr. John McNeile Hunter, and Dr. Halson V. Eagleson. On April 28, 1977, the Society was established at Morgan State University, with its founding co-chairs being Walter E. Massey and James Davenport. As of 2023, the NSBP relocated its headquarters from Arlington, Virginia to the Optica headquarters in Washington, DC.

== Activities ==
The organization holds its annual conference in February. More recently, it has jointly held these conferences with the National Society of Hispanic Physicists. Attendance at these conferences is upwards of 500 persons, drawing people from all over the world, from Kenya to California. This conference has a cutting-edge scientific program as well as a student professional development program that includes mentor-protégé match-making and a recruiting fair.

Throughout its history NSBP has had an active interest in physics related activities outside of the United States. Twenty years ago under the leadership of the late Nobel Laureate, Abdus Salam, and the late Charles Brown, several NSBP members organized the Edward Bouchet Abdus Salam Institute (EBASI). EBASI (1) provides mechanisms for synergistic scientific and technical collaborations between African and American physical scientists, engineers, and technologists, (2) enhances the impact of science and technology on the sustainable development of the countries on the African continent, and (3) increases the technical manpower pool working in Africa today by facilitating the training of Ph.D. students from African universities. More recently, through a program funded by the Kellogg Foundation NSBP will assist South Africa in its efforts to increase the number of Black astronomers and astrophysicists and to build capacity in the field.

The organization offers scholarships, some in conjunction with Black Enterprise magazine, and conducts outreach programs aimed at students from kindergarten through high school.

== Notable members ==
Neil DeGrasse Tyson and Ronald L. Mallett are affiliated with the organization. Shirley Ann Jackson served as its president. As of 2022, the President is Hakeem Oluseyi.

== Past presidents ==
- Joseph Johnson III
- Shirley Ann Jackson (1980–1982)
- Ernest Coleman (1984–1986)
- Kennedy Reed (1990–1992)
- Sekazi Mtingwa (1992–1994)
- Sylvester James Gates (1997)
- James H. Stith
- Charles McGruder III
- Keith Jackson
- Quinton Williams
- K. Renee Horton (2016–2018)
- Stephon Alexander (2021)
