= Sigma Pi Sigma =

Honor society for physics and astronomy

- ΣΠΣ
- Founded: December 11, 1921; 104 years ago Davidson College
- Type: Honor
- Affiliation: ACHS
- Status: Active
- Emphasis: Physics
- Scope: International
- Colors: Forest Green and Ivory
- Publication: Radiations
- Chapters: 575+
- Members: 90,000+ lifetime
- Headquarters: One Physics Ellipse; College Park, Maryland 20740; United States
- Website: www.sigmapisigma.org

Sigma Pi Sigma (ΣΠΣ) is an American honor society for physics and astronomy. It was founded at Davidson College in Davidson, North Carolina on December 11, 1921. It is the oldest and only American honor society for physics and astronomy. It is an organization within the Society of Physics Students and the American Institute of Physics. It is a member of the Association of College Honor Societies.

== History ==
=== Academic fraternity ===
Sigma Pi Sigma was founded by a group of ten students and faculty members at Davidson College on December 11, 1921, as an academic fraternity. It was the first in the United States specifically dedicated to the study of physics. Historically, it was associated with Gamma Sigma Epsilon, another academic fraternity founded in 1919 by Davidson students interested in chemistry. Its first president was J.K. Price.

The first major expansion of Sigma Pi Sigma occurred in 1925 when a second chapter was founded at Duke University. Three years later, in 1928, the society held its first Physics Congress, a national gathering attended by members of the then six extant chapters.

=== Honor society ===
In 1934, the Third National Convention of Sigma Pi Sigma elected to transition the organization from an academic fraternity to a society, and in 1945. It became a member of the Association of College Honor Societies, an accrediting organization for honor societies in the U.S.

The society's stated goals are "to honor outstanding scholarship in physics and astronomy; to encourage interest in physics and astronomy among students at all levels; to promote an attitude of service of its members towards their fellow students, colleagues, and the public; to provide a fellowship of persons who have excelled in physics and astronomy."

Later, in 1968, the American Institute of Physics' student sections and Sigma Pi Sigma merged to create the Society of Physics Students. At present, Sigma Pi Sigma comprises almost 600 constituent chapters. It has initiated more than 90,000 members. Its national headquarters is in College Park, Maryland.

== Symbols ==
Sigma Pi Sigma's colors are forest green and ivory. Its publication is Radiations.

== Membership ==
Sigma Pi Sigma chapters are restricted to colleges and universities of recognized standing that offer a strong physics program. Eligible members include undergraduate and graduate students, faculty members, and a few others in closely related fields. Students elected to membership must attain high standards of general scholarship and outstanding achievement in physics.

Undergraduate candidates must rank in the top third of their class in general scholarship. Additionally, undergraduate candidates must complete three semesters of study and three-semester physics and/or astronomy courses that can be used to fulfill requirements for a physics and/or astronomy major before they are eligible for membership.

The society's national organization does not put restrictions on the induction of graduate students and faculty members. Additionally, the national organization does not limit membership to physics majors. Any student may join "provided that they meet the standards and have demonstrated an interest in physics and astronomy." Election to Sigma Pi Sigma results in membership for life.

=== Honorary members ===
Honorary member is the highest level of membership in Sigma Pi Sigma. Only distinguished physicists and related scientists who have made valuable contributions to physics at the national level are eligible for this honor. Local chapters may nominate candidates, but election is only by the National Council.

== Governance ==
Sigma Pi Sigma is governed by the, which consists of members of the Society of Physics Students (SPS). The SPS National Council and its executive committee decide the policies of SPS and Sigma Pi Sigma. The National Council is made up of 36 members, elected by chapters from eighteen geographic zones. The SPS Executive Committee consists of the presidents of the Society of Physics Students and Sigma Pi Sigma, the SPS National Office Director, the SPS/Sigma Pi Sigma historian (ex officio), an at-large member selected by the CEO of the American Institute of Physics, an elected student representative of the council, and the CEO of the American Institute of Physics.

Past Presidents include:

Past Directors of SPS and Sigma Pi Sigma include:
Name	Affiliation	Tenure
Brad Conrad	National Institute of Standards and Technology	2026-2028
Blane Baker	William Jewel College	2024-2026
James Borgardt	Juniata College	2018-2022
Willie Rockward	Morehouse College	2014-2018
William DeGraffenreid	California Sacramento State	2012-2014
Diane Jacobs	Eastern Michigan University	2010-2012
Ann Viano	Rhodes College	2006-2010
Steve Feller	Coe College	2002-2006
Thomas Olsen	Lewis & Clark College	1998-2002
Jean Krisch	University of Michigan - Ann Arbor	1994-1998
Reuben James	SUNY Onesta	1990-1994

== Chapters ==
Sigma Pi Sigma has installed over 575 chapters since its founding.

== See also ==
- Honor cords
- Professional fraternities and sororities
