= Elaine Melotti Schmidt =

American educator, philanthropist

- Education: Temple University
- Occupation: Educator
- Known for: Art collector

Elaine Melotti Schmidt is an American educator, philanthropist, art curator and collector.

== Career ==
A Michigan native, Melotti Schmidt is best known as an educator. She received her doctorate in Educational Leadership and Policy Studies from Temple University in Philadelphia and worked in schools on three continents. Her areas of specialization include early childhood, special education, second language learners, and at-risk student instruction. She served from 2002 to 2013 as founding principal of the Barron/Sara Isaacs Early Childhood School in the Plano Independent School District near Dallas.

Melotti Schmidt is married to Steven Alan Bennett and they have an extensive art collection of works by women figurative realist painters. Their collection contains several hundred works and is composed exclusively of works depicting women by women painters.

To further support the type of work they collect, Melotti Schmidt and Bennett established The Bennett Prize for Women Figurative Realists ("The Bennett Prize") in 2016. The competition awards $50,000 biennially to a woman figurative realist painter following a juried competition. The Prize also sponsors a traveling exhibition of the works of the ten finalists. The Bennett Prize has been awarded three times since inception and has recognized 30 women painters as finalists.

She has curated art exhibitions including “Visions of Venus” at the Zhou B Art Center in Chicago in 2018; “Inside Out: Outside In” at the RJD Gallery in Sag Harbor, New York, in 2019 and “Story Tellers” at Flinders Lane Gallery in Australia in 2020. In 2019, she co-curated with her husband “Secondary Meanings” at the Zhou B Center and then in 2021, she and Bennett curated “Iconic” and “Painting the Figure Now IV” at the Wausau Museum of Contemporary Art in Wausau, Wisconsin.

In 2022, Melotti Schmidt and Bennett made a $12 Million gift to the Muskegon Museum of Art, the host museum for the Bennett Prize competition, which included a monetary donation along with art from their collection. In February 2025, the Bennett-Schmidt Pavilion, a 26,000-square-foot expansion, opened at the museum doubling its size. The opening featured a new gift of 70 paintings on view for the event for a total of over 150 paintings from their collection donated to the museum.

== The Collection ==
Melotti Schmidt and Bennett's personal collection has been compiled over many years. The Bennett Collection is composed of historic works including pieces by Mary Cassatt, Artemisia Gentileschi, Elaine de Kooning, Sarah Miriam Peale, Agnes Martin, and Suzanne Valadon. Among the living artists represented in the collection are major works by Julie Bell, Margaret Bowland, Zoey Frank, Xenia Hausner, Andrea Kowch, Katie O’Hagan, Harmonia Rosales, Alyssa Monks, Annie Brito Hodgin, SuSu, and Kathrin Longhurst, among others.

== Philanthropy ==
Melotti Schmidt and her husband are supporters of the charity Friends of Kenyan Orphans, which provides food and shelter along with K-12 education to orphans in Kenya. In addition, the couple sponsors The Bennett-Schmidt Lectures on the Higher Aim of Art at Studio Incamminati. a school encouraging contemporary figurative realism in Philadelphia as well as the Olmos Ensemble of San Antonio, a classical music group.
