= Bennett Prize for Women Figurative Realists =

Art award for women painters

The Bennett Prize
- Description: A biennial prize supporting women figurative realist painters
- Country: United States
- Presented by: Muskegon Museum of Art
- Website: https://thebennettprize.org/

The Bennett Prize for Women Figurative Realists ("The Bennett Prize") is a $50,000 biennial art prize established in 2016 by American art collectors Steven Alan Bennett and Dr. Elaine Melotti Schmidt.

Bennett and Schmidt are married and have an extensive collection of works by women figurative realist painters. Their collection contains several hundred works and is composed exclusively of works depicting women by women painters. In establishing The Bennett Prize, Bennett and Schmidt expressed a desire to support the type of work they collect. Since establishing the prize, Bennett and Schmidt have announced a $12 Million gift to the Muskegon Museum of Art, the host museum for the Bennett Prize competition, which gift includes art from their Collection as well as cash.

== Endowment and description ==
The Bennett Prize for Women Figurative Realists is an art prize endowed by San Antonio-based art collectors and philanthropists Steven Alan Bennett and his wife Dr. Elaine Melotti Schmidt in 2016. Established with a $3 million fund established at The Pittsburgh Foundation, it is the largest art award ever offered solely to women painters. With the stated goal of seeking to propel the careers of women figurative realist painters, the winner of The Bennett Prize receives $25,000 annually for each of two years to allow her to devote the time necessary to mount a solo exhibition of figurative realist paintings, which are exhibited at the Muskegon Museum of Art in Muskegon, Michigan and then travel the country. In addition to the sum paid to the winner, The Bennett Prize also offers cash awards of $1000 to each of up to eight (8) finalists selected from among the entrants. Commencing with the third iteration of the prize, a cash award of $10,000 is presented to a first runner-up selected by the jury. This award is called The Elaine Melotti Schmidt Prize for Promise in Figurative Realism.

The prize is awarded once every two years to a woman painter whose principal focus is figurative painting done in a realistic style. Among the rules are requirements that contestants reside in the United States at least part of the year and that submitted work be present in the United States and not have to cross an international border in order to be displayed. Despite the Bennetts’ limitation of their personal collection to paintings of women by women artists, the Bennett Prize is not similarly restricted. Depictions of all genders are permissible, although the submitting artist must identify as a woman, regardless of their assigned gender at birth. This includes trans and cis women and nonbinary people.

== The Collection ==
The Bennetts’ personal collection has come together over many years. The Bennett Collection comprises several historic works including pieces by Mary Cassatt, Artemisia Gentileschi, Elaine de Kooning, Sarah Miriam Peale, Agnes Martin, and Suzanne Valadon. Among the living artists represented in the collection are major works by Julie Bell, Margaret Bowland, Andrea Kowch, Alyssa Monks, Zoey Frank, Xenia Hausner, SuSu, Katie O’Hagan, Harmonia Rosales, and Kathrin Longhurst, among numerous others.

== Mission ==
The aim of the prize is to fund an artist for two years to enable them to focus solely on creating art. In a comment to American Art Collector Schmidt said: "In our discussions with women artists, we could sense the genuine struggle presented by making a living, raising a family and trying to paint, all at the same time. Our worry was that all this juggling when combined with working in obscurity, might invite some women to quit too soon."

In addition to fighting gender discrimination, Bennett and Schmidt also aim to promote figurative realism, a genre they believe has been disadvantaged by the attitudes of arts professionals and institutional art organizations. Thus, the stated mission of The Bennett Prize is to counteract gender discrimination against women fine art painters and encourage and also enable their pursuit of figurative realism.

== History ==
Bennett and Schmidt co-created The Bennett Prize for Women Figurative Realists with the Center for Philanthropy at The Pittsburgh Foundation, which was selected for its experience in working with donors to establish specifically tailored philanthropic initiatives. In addition, Bennett and Schmidt selected The Pittsburgh Foundation because of its experience with programs that support local artists and artists of color through its "Investing in Professional Arts and Advancing Black Arts in Pittsburgh" grant-making programs which The Pittsburgh Foundation oversees in collaboration with The Heinz Endowments. The Pittsburgh Foundation, working in consultation with Bennett and Schmidt, sponsors The Bennett Prize, but the selection of finalists and the winner is delegated to a jury of four individuals, at least two of whom must be women and, preferably working artists who, but for their experience and success, would meet the eligibility requirements for the prize.

The initial call for entries for The Bennett Prize opened in April and closed in September 2018. The jury deliberated and on November 15, 2018, announced the first group of finalists. On May 2, 2019, the inaugural winner was announced at The Muskegon Museum of Art in Muskegon. The second call for entries opened in April 2020 and closed in September 2020. The finalists for the second Bennett Prize were announced on November 30, 2020. The second winner was announced on May 27, 2021. The third call for entries opened on April 18, 2022, and closed on October 7, 2022. The round three prize winner and runner-up was announced at the opening exhibition in Muskegon on May 18, 2023. In April 2024, it was announced that submissions for the fourth iteration of the prize were being accepted through October 4, 2024, and the 2025 winners were announced on May 15, 2025.

In 2022, Bennett and Schmidt made a $12 Million gift to the Muskegon Museum of Art, which included a monetary donation along with art from their collection. In February 2025, the Bennett-Schmidt Pavilion, a 26,000-square-foot expansion, opened at the museum doubling its size. The opening featured a new gift of 70 paintings on view for the event for a total of over 150 paintings from their collection donated to the museum.

== 2019 Prize Winners ==
Aneka Ingold from Tampa, Florida was the first winner of the prize. Her works explore women's experiences across time, culture and history. Ingold received $25,000 annually for two years, a total of $50,000, which allowed her to devote the time necessary to create new work for her solo exhibition, which opened at the Muskegon Museum of Art in 2021 and then traveled the country.

=== 2019 Finalists ===
The women painters named as finalists for the 2019 Bennett Prize were:

- Dorielle Caimi, Santa Fe, New Mexico
- Jennifer Campbell, Washington D.C.
- Kira Nam Greene, Brooklyn, New York
- Mary Henderson, Philadelphia, Pennsylvania
- Aneka Ingold, Tampa, Florida
- Stefanie Jackson, Athens, Georgia
- Daniela Kovacic, Evanston, Illinois
- Rebecca Leveille, Amherst, Massachusetts
- Jenny Morgan, Brooklyn, New York
- Carrie Pearce, Peoria, Illinois

=== 2019 Honorable Mentions ===
In addition to the finalists, the jury, impressed with the quality of the work submitted for the first Prize, elected to call out several contestants with honorable mentions. The artists receiving honorable mentions were:

- Bryony Bensly, Lunenburg, Massachusetts
- Shiqing Deng, Brooklyn, New York
- Michelle Doll, Hoboken, New Jersey
- Jessica Gordon, Davidson, North Carolina
- Sasha Gordon, Somers, New York
- Sylvia Maier, Brooklyn, New York
- Nora Martin-Hall, Los Angeles, California
- Felicita Norris, San Jose, California
- Rebecca Orcutt, Brooklyn, New York
- Natasha Young, Kealia, Hawaii

== 2021 Prize Winners ==
Ayana Ross from McDonough, Georgia was the second winner of the prize on May 27, 2021. Her works feature family themes and, in her words, “explore intersecting issues of race, gender, identity and economics” as seen in daily life. Ross’ solo exhibition opened at the Muskegon Museum of Art on May 18, 2023, at which time the exhibition of the third prize finalists and winner was announced.

=== 2021 Finalists ===
The women painters named as finalists for the 2021 Bennett Prize were:

- Sophia Yemisi Adeyano-Ross, Providence, Rhode Island
- Tanmaya Bingham, Portland, Oregon
- Chloe Chiasson, Brooklyn, New York
- June Glasson, Millbrook, New York
- Holly Keogh, Charlotte, North Carolina
- Lavely Miller, Baltimore, Maryland
- Rebecca Orcutt, North Bend, Washington
- Ayana Ross, McDonough, Georgia
- Su Su, Pittsburgh, Pennsylvania
- Amy Werntz, Dallas, Texas

== 2023 Prize Winners ==
Shiqing Deng from Brooklyn, New York was named as the third winner of the prize on May 18, 2023. The inaugural Dr. Elaine Melotti Schmidt Prize for Achievement in Figurative Realism, which included a $10,000 prize, was awarded to Ruth Dealy from Providence, Rhode Island.

=== 2023 Finalists ===
The women painters named as finalists for the 2023 Bennett Prize were:

- Ruth Dealy, Providence, Rhode Island
- Shiqing Deng, Brooklyn, New York
- Ronna S. Harris, New Orleans, Louisiana, and Boone, North Carolina
- Haley Hasler, Fort Collins, Colorado
- Sara Lee Hughes, Lockhart, Texas
- Monica Ikegwu, Baltimore, Maryland
- Laura Karetzky, Brooklyn, New York
- Linda Infante Lyons, Anchorage, Alaska
- Mayumi Nakao, Brooklyn, New York
- Kyla Zoe Rafert, Amanda, Ohio.

== 2025 Prize Winners ==
Amy Werntz of Dallas, Texas was named as the fourth winner of the prize on May 15, 2025. The second winner of the Dr. Elaine Melotti Schmidt Prize for Achievement in Figurative Realism, which included a $10,000 prize, was Nicole M. Santiago of Williamsburg, Virginia. The awards were determined by an all-women jury for the first time in the history of the competition.

=== 2025 Finalists ===
The women painters named as finalists for the 2025 Bennett Prize were:

- Olivia Chigas, New York, New York
- Nimah Gobir, Oakland, California
- Ambrin Ling, Salem, Oregon
- Jane Philips, Brooklyn, New York
- Audrey Rodriguez, Brooklyn, New York
- Abbey Rosko, New Tripoli, Pennsylvania
- Nicole M. Santiago of Williamsburg, Virginia
- Amy Werntz of Dallas, Texas
- Helena Wurzel, Cambridge, Massachusetts
- Rei Xiao, Brooklyn, New York

== 2027 Prize Winners ==
In April 2026, it was announced that submissions for the fifth iteration of the prize were being accepted through September 19, with the 2027 winners to be announced on May 20, 2027.

== Exhibitions ==
The first Finalists’ Exhibition, called "Rising Voices", ran through September 8, 2019, at the Muskegon Museum. It then traveled to different venues in 2020 and 2021 and closed at the Pittsburgh Cultural Trust's 937 Gallery on August 8, 2021. The exhibition for the second iteration of the prize, “Rising Voices 2”, was exhibited at the Customs House Museum in Clarksville, Tennessee, the Arnot Museum in Elmira, New York, the Bo Bartlett Center in Columbus, Georgia, the Pittsburgh Cultural Trust in Pittsburgh, Pennsylvania, and the Studio Incamminati in Philadelphia, Pennsylvania. "The Bennett Prize: Rising Voices 3" was on exhibit at the Muskegon Museum along with museums in New York, Georgia, Pennsylvania, and Tennessee in 2023. "The Bennett Prize: Rising Voices 4" exhibition premiered at the announcement of the winners on May 15, 2025 along with the exhibition "The Cost of Life" by 2023 winner Deng Shiqing, which will travel around the country including works of the 2025 finalists.

== See also ==
- List of awards honoring women
