= Doane Academy =

Private school in Burlington, New Jersey, US

Location
- 350 Riverbank; Burlington, Burlington County, New Jersey 08016; United States; 40.079025°N 74.867174°W

Information
- Type: Independent day school
- Motto: Right Onward
- Religious affiliation: Episcopal
- Established: 1837; 189 years ago
- Founder: George Washington Doane
- NCES School ID: 00868553
- Head of school: Erin Pike Mayo
- Faculty: 38 FTEs
- Grades: PreK-twelfth grade
- Gender: Coeducational
- Enrollment: 217 (plus 16 in PreK, as of 2023–24)
- Student to teacher ratio: 5.7:1
- Campus size: 15.11 acres (6.11 ha)
- Campus type: Suburban, riverside
- Colors: Navy blue Carolina blue White
- Athletics: Baseball, Softball, Soccer, Cross Country, Rowing, Basketball, Bowling
- Athletics conference: Burlington County Scholastic League
- Mascot: Sparty
- Team name: Spartans
- Accreditation: Middle States Association of Colleges and Schools Commission on Elementary and Secondary Schools
- Endowment: $29,000,000
- School fees: $350 (grades 9–12 for 2025–26)
- Annual tuition: $24,950 (grades 9–12 for 2025–26)
- Alumni name: The Society of Graduates
- Website: www.doaneacademy.org
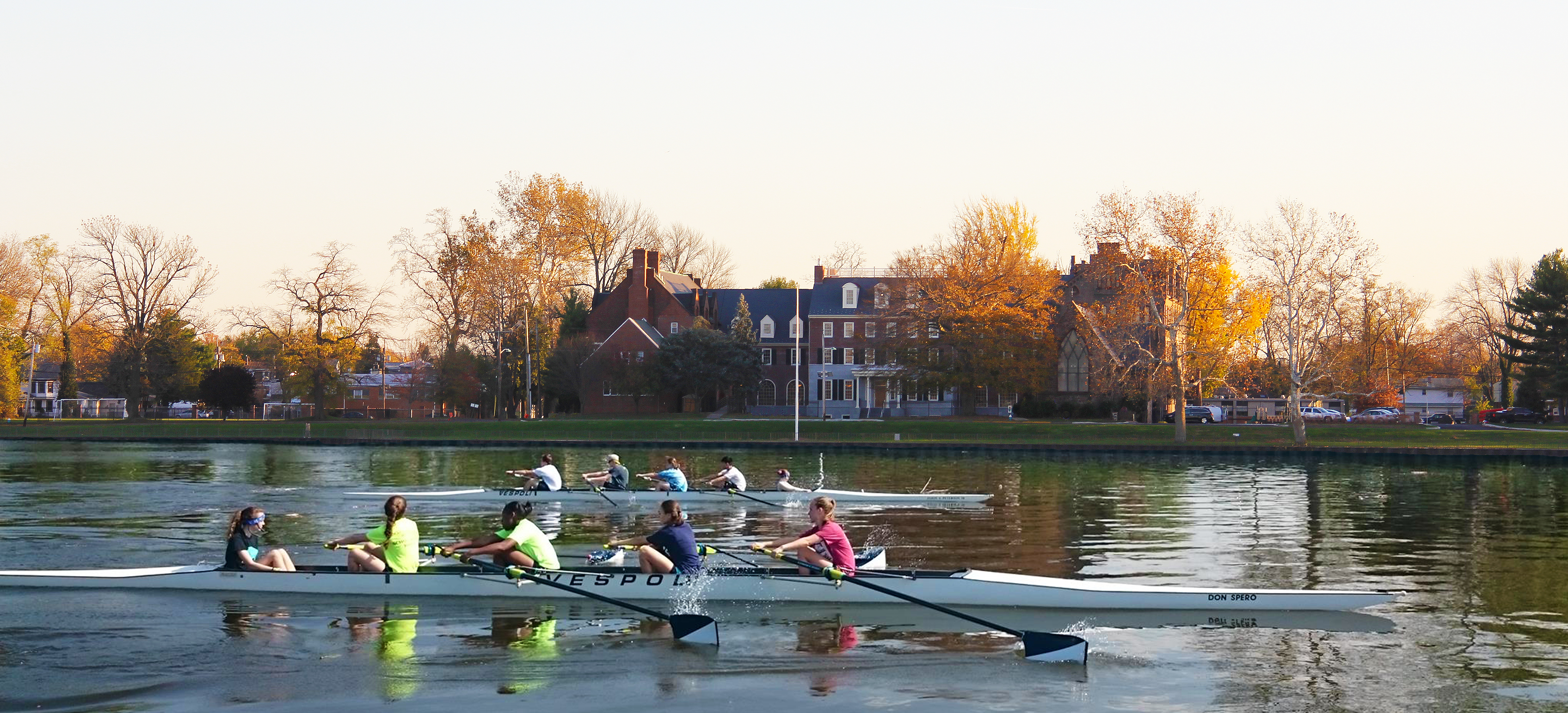
- Doane Academy from the Delaware River

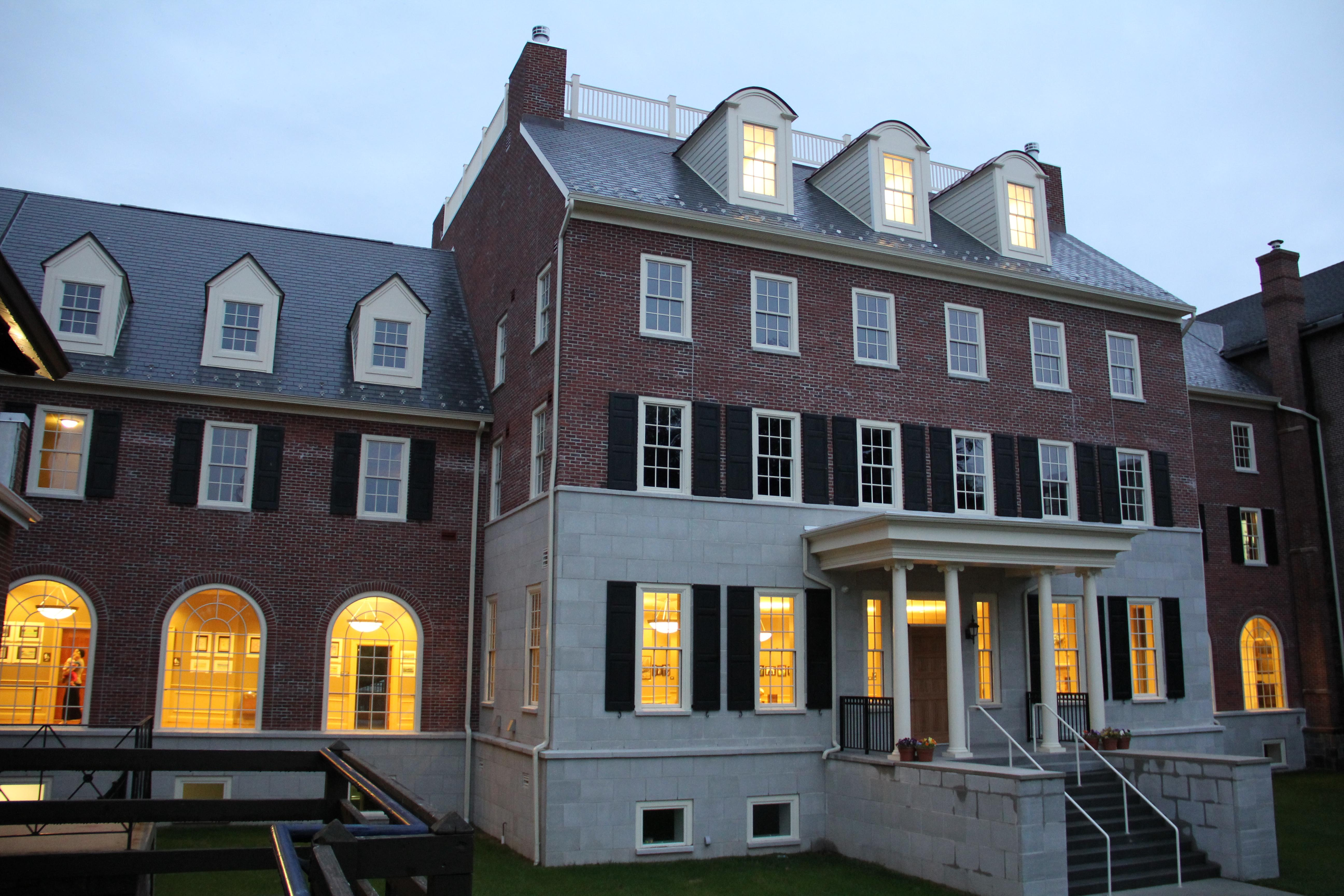
Rowan Hall (2015) houses modern classrooms, while replicating the external appearance of the school building as it looked in 1837.

Doane Academy is a coeducational, independent day school serving students in pre-kindergarten through twelfth grade, located in Burlington in Burlington County, in the U.S. state of New Jersey. Originally called St. Mary's Hall, it was founded in May 1837 by Episcopal Bishop George Washington Doane, initially as an Episcopal girls' boarding school, the first in the United States to offer a classical academic education to women. Doane Academy is the eighth-oldest private school in the state.

In 1955 affiliation with the diocese was severed. In 1966 a boys' school, known as Doane Academy, was built on campus. The schools were merged in 1974 as St. Mary's Hall-Doane Academy. Later the name was shortened to the Doane Academy.

The head of school is Erin Pike Mayo The school is accredited by the Middle States Association of Colleges and Schools Commission on Elementary and Secondary Schools until July 2029 and has been accredited since 1989, and is a member of the New Jersey Association of Independent Schools, the National Association of Independent Schools and the National Association of Episcopal Schools.

== History ==
The academy was founded as St. Mary's Hall by the Right Reverend George Washington Doane, second Episcopal bishop of New Jersey. Through the diocese he purchased an existing girls' school. St. Mary's opened on May 1, 1837, with 52 pupils. Founded to offer a classical education equal to that of boys, it accepted girls and young women as undergraduates and postgraduates. The young women were prepared to be teachers. It was the first all-girls academic boarding school in the United States. During its early years, the students mostly came from the East Coast, but were drawn from a wide area, ranging from New England to Virginia, and into upstate New York, who traveled to the school by boat and stagecoach.

Bishop Doane raised capital for the new school by issuing shares of stock, but a severe financial depression hit the United States just as the school was opening. Saint Mary's Hall survived, financed mainly from the personal funds of Eliza Green Perkins Doane, the Bishop's wife. She received a $9,500 annual dowry from the estate of her late first husband, which she donated to the school.

The success of St. Mary's Hall encouraged Bishop Doane to open a boys' school on an adjacent site in 1846. The new Burlington College, though, did not enjoy the success of the girls' school, and its doors closed in 1877. The girls' school continued to flourish, its campus developing throughout the late 19th century. Teachers generally lived in houses nearby, especially along Wood Street.

This prosperity continued into the first half of the 20th century, when central heating was introduced, as were electric lighting and showers. A large nearby house was purchased, initially to be used as a lower school and later as a senior dorm.

Many private schools were forced to close during the Depression, but St. Mary's Hall was able to increase the number of day pupils by establishing additional bus routes over the newly completed Burlington-Bristol Bridge to Pennsylvania on the other side of the Delaware River. By the 1950s, though, boarding numbers were in decline. In 1953, the trustees decided to abandon boarding and become a day school. The affiliation with the diocese was ended in 1955.

In 1966, the trustees again opened a boys' school, Doane Academy, in association with St. Mary's Hall. Although managed by the same Board of Trustees, the two schools were separate institutions. Signage around St. Mary's Hall instructed the girls, "Do not fraternize with the Doane boys."

On February 27, 1974, the main building on the St. Mary's campus was destroyed by fire. There had been plans afoot to merge the two schools, and the damage from the fire encouraged the trustees to bring the plan forward. From September 1974, a single school—the co-educational St. Mary's Hall-Doane Academy—opened under a new headmaster, Rev. William Scheel. In April 2008 the name was shortened to Doane Academy.

=== Endowment ===
In January 2015, Henry Rowan (1923–2015) and his wife Eleanor, long-time benefactors, gifted $17 million toward the endowment fund of Doane Academy, with the proceeds available to the school in perpetuity. The school's current endowment is $28 million.

With previous Rowan gifts and other donations, the school was able to erect and furnish Rowan Hall (2015). It connects Scarborough Hall (1912) and Odenheimer Hall (1868), unifying the campus.

== Campus ==
Doane Academy is located on a campus of 15.11 acres (6.11 ha) at the western end of the City of Burlington and is situated along the banks of the Delaware River in an area also known as The Green Bank. It includes among its structures three buildings listed on the National Register of Historic Places, including the Chapel of the Holy Innocents. This has been classified as the first Gothic cruciform church in the United States. The building has been recorded in the Historic American Buildings Survey (HABS), with measured drawings held by the Library of Congress. The chapel houses a fine example of an early, 2 manual, mechanical action pipe organ. Originally built by Hall and Labaugh in 1854 and rebuilt by George Jardine and Son in 1900, it was restored in 2012 by Patrick J Murphy and Associates. In 2019, Doane Academy acquired the two properties associated with the former Elias Boudinot Elementary School, which are contiguous to the Doane Academy campus. This acquisition, which includes land that had been sold by the academy to the city in 1955, grows the campus by about fifteen percent.

== Student body ==
The school has students enrolled from 41 municipalities across the states of New Jersey and Pennsylvania.

As of the 2023–24 school year, the school had an enrollment of 217 students (plus 16 in PreK) and 38 classroom teachers (on an FTE basis), for a student–teacher ratio of 5.7:1.

== Curriculum ==
The school offers a broad curriculum, with lower school students pursuing courses in mathematics, language arts, science, and social studies. In addition, they study Spanish and music. Students from grades 6 through 12 are required to study a core curriculum of English, mathematics and the sciences, together with studies in subjects including history, fine arts, and performing arts.

== Sport and extracurricular activities ==
Every student in grades 9—12 is required to play on a team for at least one season a year. The pupils in grades 6—8 compete against other middle school teams in soccer, boys' and girls' basketball, baseball and softball. Students in grades 9—12 compete at varsity level in the Burlington County Scholastic League in cross country running, boys' and girls' soccer, boys' and girls' basketball, baseball, softball and bowling. The co-ed crew team competes in regional regattas in both the fall and spring.

The Doane Academy Spartans compete in interscholastic sports as part of the Burlington County Scholastic League which is comprised of public and private high schools in the Burlington County area and operates under the supervision of the New Jersey State Interscholastic Athletic Association (NJSIAA), for all sports with the exception of the crew team. With 99 students in grades 10-12, the school was classified by the NJSIAA for the 2019–20 school year as Non-Public B for most athletic competition purposes, which included schools with an enrollment of 37 to 366 students in that grade range (equivalent to Group I for public schools).

Sports facilities at the school include two soccer fields, a softball field, the Winzinger Baseball Field, a full-sized gymnasium and a fitness center. The Delaware River is used for crew practices. The cross-country team practices on and around the campus.

Honors

- Penn-Jersey Baseball champions: 2014, 2015
- Penn-Jersey Softball champions: 1992, 1993, 2003, 2007, 2008, 2009, 2010, 2014, 2015, 2016, 2017
- Penn-Jersey Cross Country champions: 2012, 2013, 2014, 2015, 2016, 2017, 2018
- BCSL - Burlington County Division Cross Country Championship Open: 2019
- BCSL - Burlington County Independence Division Baseball Champions: 2023
- Penn-Jersey Girls Soccer champions: 1979, 1980, 1992, 2010, 2011
- Penn-Jersey Boys Basketball champions: 2014
- NJSIAA Prep B Boys Basketball state champions 2019 (winning 57-51 vs. The Pennington School in the finals) and 2022 (winning 69-59 vs. Princeton Day School)
- Middle School Basketball undefeated seasons: 2005–2006, 2008–2009

=== Visual arts ===
Doane Academy's art department contains two art studios and one ceramics studio. The school has a partnership with Studio Incamminati. Teaching artists show students the techniques and principles of modern humanist realism. Nelson Shanks, artist and co-founder of Studio Incamminati, said that one of the goals of his Realism school and program was to train students to “see” beyond the shape and color of the subject. The partnership provides Doane students with daily instruction from Studio Incamminati.

=== Performing arts ===
In the spring of each year, the Upper School's Spartan Studio Actors put on a play or musical. Recent performances have included Firebirds, The Diary of Anne Frank, You're A Good Man, Charlie Brown (Revised), Little Shop of Horrors, All in the Timing, and The World Goes 'Round. In May or June, the Lower School stages a production, such as Hamlet for Kids and The Day the Crayons Quit. Students interested in the performing arts, both on and off the stage, have numerous opportunities to participate in other dramatic and musical performances throughout the year.

The academy has a band, a choir, and a string ensemble for both the Upper and Lower schools. It also has a jazz ensemble, percussion ensemble and pit orchestra.

== Notable alumni ==
=== Arts and media ===
- Minna Antrim (1861–1950), writer
- Bill Barretta (born 1964, class of 1982), puppeteer and producer
- Gene Barretta (born 1960, class of 1978), children's book author and illustrator, animator, and character designer
- Romaine Brooks (1874–1970), painter
- Laura Dayton Fessenden (1852-1924), author
- Miriam Coles Harris (1834–1925), author
- Sara Hershey-Eddy (1837–1911), musician, pianist, contralto vocalist, vocal instructor and musical educator who founded the Hershey School of Musical Art in Chicago
- Judith Light (born 1949, class of 1966), actress and producer
- Mary L. F. Ormsby (1845–1931), writer, editor, and educator involved in the peace movement
- Emily Stevens (1883–1928), stage and screen actress in Broadway plays in the first three decades of the 20th century and later in silent movies
- Kate Swift (1923–2011, class of 1941), feminist writer and editor who wrote books and articles about sexism in the English language. She wrote the lyrics to the original alma mater for St. Mary's Hall.

=== Other ===
- Edward Burd Grubb Jr. (1841–1913), Union Army colonel and regimental commander in the American Civil War
- Alice S. Huang (born 1939, class of 1957), biologist specializing in microbiology and virology who is Senior Faculty Associate in Biology at the California Institute of Technology, and served as President of AAAS during the 2010–2011 term
- Alice Lakey (1857-1935), activist who supported the Pure Foods Movement

== Notable faculty and staff ==
- Lois Kelso Hunt (1926-2018), actress, theater director and arts advocate
- Bernetta Adams Miller (1884-1972), pioneering woman aviator who was the fifth licensed woman pilot in the United States
- Elizabeth Searcy (1877-1965), artist
