= The Bennett Collection =

Art collection

- Established: 2009; 17 years ago
- Collection size: 200+
- Founders: Steven Alan Bennett and Dr. Elaine Melotti Schmidt
- Website: www.thebennettartcollection.com

The Bennett Collection is an art collection established and maintained by art collectors and philanthropists, Steven Alan Bennett and Dr. Elaine Melotti Schmidt of San Antonio, Texas. They are also the founders of the Bennett Prize for Women Figurative Realists, which awards $50,000 biennially to a woman figurative realist painter following a juried competition followed by a traveling exhibition of the works of the 10 finalists for the Prize.

== History ==
Bennett and Schmidt established the collection in 2009. At that time, the couple began collecting art with a special emphasis on paintings of women by women artists. In the intervening years, the couple has acquired a collection of paintings of women by women. These works span the period from the early 1600s to the present and include works by deceased artists as well as those by important women painters working today. Both Bennett and Schmidt have stated that among their primary goals in starting the collection was to address what they viewed as systemic discrimination against women artists by ‘big art’ and to promote figurative realism, a genre they believe has fallen out of favor because of the bias of curators and museum directors in favor of abstraction and avant-garde art.

In 2022, Bennett and Schmidt made a $12 Million gift to the Muskegon Museum of Art, the host museum for the Bennett Prize competition, which included a monetary donation along with art from their collection. In February 2025, the Bennett-Schmidt Pavilion, a 26,000-square-foot expansion, opened at the museum doubling its size. The opening featured a new gift of 70 paintings on view for the event for a total of over 150 paintings from their collection donated to the museum.

== The Collection ==
The collection contains both contemporary and historic paintings exclusively by women artists of women subjects and sitters. The collection is also limited in that it includes only ‘figurative realist’ artworks, which the couple defines as work “in which the realistically depicted human figure is central to and a principal focus of the work.”

Initially started as a collection of works by living women painters, The Bennett Collection comprises over 200 works by women artists. As stated by Bennett, “[the collection] is a place that shows what is possible for contemporary figurative realists and provides an example of what women painters are capable of. Eventually, we would hope that both communities, figurative realists and women painters get a boost from what we are doing.” Shortly after beginning their collecting activities, Bennett and Schmidt, who are married, decided to add work by historic women painters to those of the contemporary artists already in the collection. In making this decision, the couple felt that the addition of historical women artists would boost the collectability of the work of living women artists.

The Bennett Collection includes several historic works including pieces by Mary Cassatt, Artemisia Gentileschi, Elaine de Kooning, Sarah Miriam Peale, Agnes Martin, and Suzanne Valadon. Among the living artists represented in the collection are major works by Julie Bell, Margaret Bowland, Andrea Kowch, Alyssa Monks, Zoey Frank, Xenia Hausner, SuSu, Katie O’Hagan, Harmonia Rosales, Kathrin Longhurst, and Annie Brito Hodgin, among numerous others.
