= Steven Alan Bennett =

American art collector

- Education: University of Notre Dame; University of Kansas School of Law
- Occupation: Attorney
- Known for: Art collector

Steven Alan Bennett is an American attorney, art collector, and philanthropist.

== Career ==
After stints at several Fortune 100 companies, Bennett retired in September 2015 as executive vice president, chief legal officer and corporate secretary of USAA. In 1996, President Bill Clinton appointed Bennett as a member and, later, as Vice Chairman of the Woodrow Wilson International Center for Scholars within the Smithsonian Institution.

== Art collecting ==
Bennett works on collecting art, writing an art blog, producing a podcast, and participating in various philanthropic projects. He is married to Elaine Melotti Schmidt and they have an extensive art collection of works by women figurative realist painters. To further support the type of work they collect, they established The Bennett Prize for Women Figurative Realists ("The Bennett Prize"), in 2016. The contest awards $50,000 biennially to a woman figurative realist painter following a juried competition, followed by a traveling exhibition of the works of the ten finalists. The Bennett Prize has been awarded three times since inception and has recognized 30 women painters as finalists.

The Bennetts’ personal collection has been compiled over many years. The Bennett Collection is composed of historic works including pieces by Mary Cassatt, Artemisia Gentileschi, Elaine de Kooning, Sarah Miriam Peale, Agnes Martin, and Suzanne Valadon. Among the living artists represented in the collection are major works by Julie Bell, Margaret Bowland, Zoey Frank, Xenia Hausner, Andrea Kowch, Katie O’Hagan, Harmonia Rosales, Alyssa Monks, SuSu, Annie Brito Hodgin, and Kathrin Longhurst, among others.

In 2022, Bennett and Schmidt made a $12 Million gift to the Muskegon Museum of Art, the host museum for the Bennett Prize competition, which included a monetary donation along with art from their collection. In February 2025, the Bennett-Schmidt Pavilion, a 26,000-square-foot expansion, opened at the museum doubling its size. The opening featured a new gift of 70 paintings on view for the event for a total of over 150 paintings from their collection donated to the museum.

== Philanthropy ==
Bennett and his wife are supporters of the charity Friends of Kenyan Orphans, which provides food and shelter along with K-12 education. He is also a founding trustee of the Center for Thomas More Studies at the University of Dallas. Bennett serves as a director on the board of a realist art school in Philadelphia, Studio Incamminati, where the couple sponsors The Bennett-Schmidt Lectures on the Higher Aim of Art.

== Background ==
Bennett is a graduate of the University of Notre Dame with a degree in art history. He also holds a Juris Doctor degree from the University of Kansas School of Law.
