= Laura Dayton Fessenden =

American author

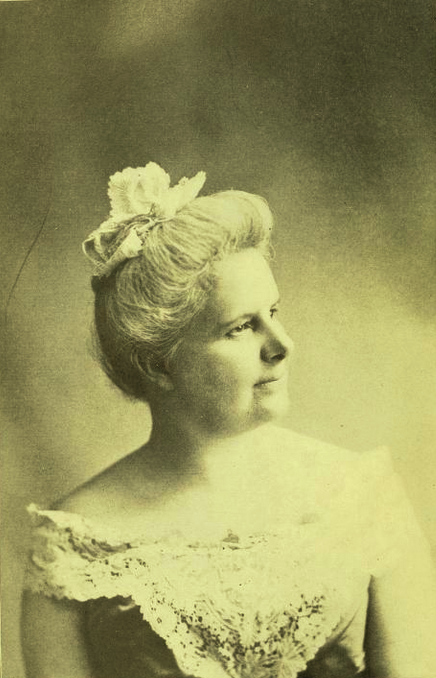
- Born: Laura Canfield Spencer Dayton; December 29, 1852; New York City, New York, U.S.
- Died: May 11, 1924 (aged 71); Chicago, Illinois, U.S.
- Resting place: Lake Forest Cemetery
- Education: St. Mary's Hall (now, Doane Academy)
- Occupation: Author
- Spouse: Benjamin Arthur Fessenden (m. 1880; died 1917)
- Children: 4
- Writing career
- Language: English

Signature
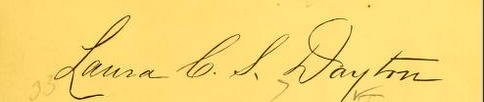

Laura Dayton Fessenden (née, Dayton; December 29, 1852 – May 11, 1924) was an American author of romances and other books between 1878 and 1923. She was a contributor to magazines and a writer of songs. She was the founder of the Highland Park Woman's Club. Before marriage, she wrote as Laura C. S. Dayton.

== Early life and education ==
Laura Canfield Spencer Dayton was born in Manhattan, New York City, December 29, 1852. Her parents were Abram Child Dayton (author of Last Days of Knickerbocker Life in New York) and Maria Annis (Tomlinson) Dayton. Her brother, Charles Willoughby Dayton, was Justice of the New York Supreme Court. She also grew up with two other brothers, William Adams Dayton and Harold Child Dayton. There were four siblings who died at birth (or in babyhood), Maria Annis Dayton, John Canfield Dayton, Theodore Edwin Dayton, and Cornelia Blow Dayton. Her ancestors came to the United States in the Mayflower.

Fessenden received her education at St. Mary's Hall (now, Doane Academy), Burlington, New Jersey.

== Career ==
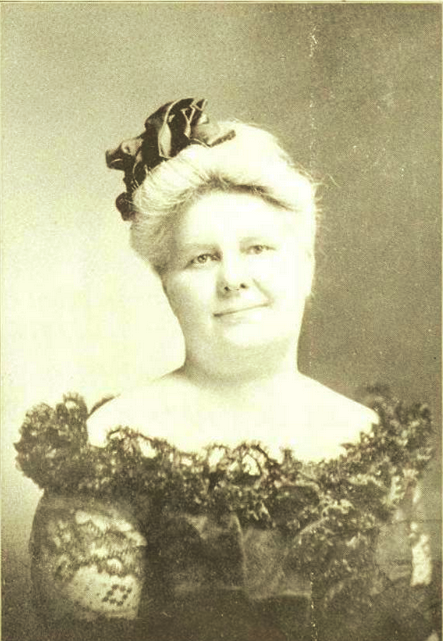
1902

Fessenden was a correspondent of various papers. She represented Harper's Bazaar at the World's Columbian Exposition, Chicago, 1893. She was the author of Beth, 1878; Essie A Romance in Rhyme, 1878; A Puritan Lover, 1887; A Colonial Dame, 1897; Chronicle of a Branch of the Dayton Family, 1902; Moon Children of the Dayton Family, 1902; and 2002, Child Life 100 Years from Now. Besides books, poems, and magazine articles, she wrote many songs for children, composing much of the music herself. Two of her works were science fiction for children: Moon Children describes an inhabited Moon and 2002 is set in a utopian future world, including technological advancements, a female US president, world peace, and contact with a Martian civilization.

During the Harding campaign, Fessenden originated the drawing room meetings held all over the country and spoke at many of them. She was a member of the Daughters of the American Revolution (D.A.R.) and served as regent, Chicago chapter, 1903). She was also a member of the Illinois Society of the Colonial Dames of America, Fortnightly of Chicago, Highland Park Woman's Club, Chicago Woman's Club, Order of the Founders and Patriots of America, Ossoli Club (Chicago), and the Antiquarian Society.

== Personal life ==
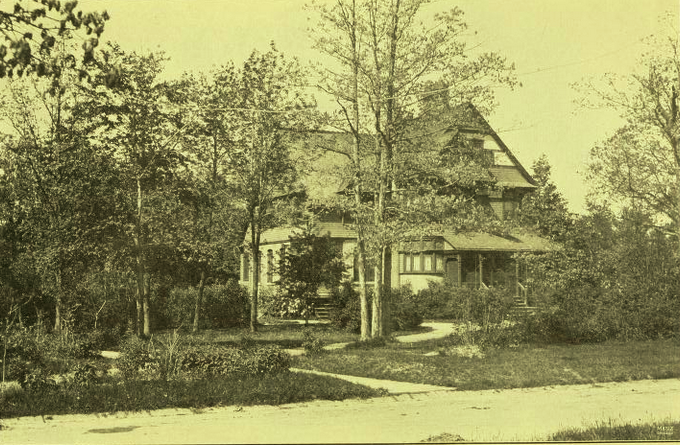
"Happiegoluckie", Fessenden home in Highland Park, Illinois

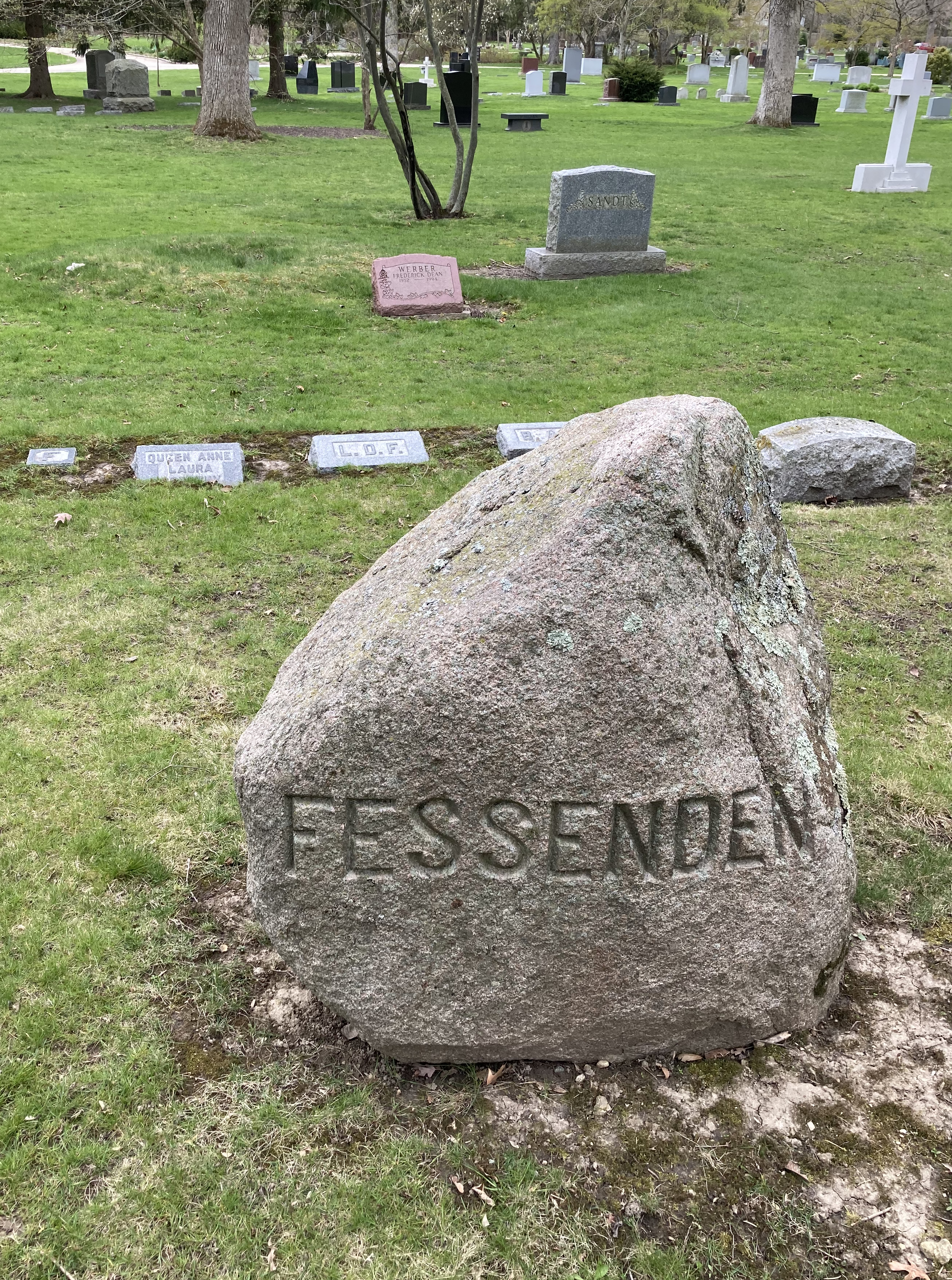
Fessenden's grave at Lake Forest Cemetery

In 1880, she married Benjamin Arthur Fessenden (1848–1917). They removed to Chicago three years later. He was involved with planning Highland Park, Illinois. Their children were: Aymar Child, Alice Hyde (married Lieut. Robert Gray Peck), Ben Hurd, and Dorothy Dayton.

In religion, she was Episcopalian.

Fessenden resided in Highland Park at the family home, "Happiegoluckie". She died May 11, 1924, at the Belden Hotel, Chicago, where she had been spending the winter with family. She was buried at Lake Forest Cemetery.

== Selected works ==
=== As Laura C. S. Dayton ===
- Beth, 1878
- Essie A Romance in Rhyme, 1878

=== As Laura Dayton Fessenden ===
- A Puritan Lover, 1887
- A colonial dame : a pen-picture of colonial days and ways, 1897
- Bonnie MacKirby : An International Episode, 1898
- Songs that the Children sing. A Collection of six Solos and two Operettas, 1901 (with Victoria Adams Barber)
- Chronicle of a Branch of the Dayton Family, 1902
- Moon Children, 1902 (with R. J. Campbell)
- "2002" : childlife one hundred years from now, 1902 (with R. J. Campbell)
- Hatsu, a story of Egypt, 1904
- Kaskaskia: a tale of border warfare in Illinois., 1905
- The white witch of Salem town, 1923
