= Bill Clinton (portrait) =

2005 painting by Nelson Shanks

Bill Clinton is the official portrait for the National Portrait Gallery of the then former 42nd President of the United States, William Jefferson Clinton by the painter Nelson Shanks. The painting was unveiled in 2006. The painting gathered media attention in 2015 when Shanks revealed that he had put in the shadow of a dress symbolizing the blue garment presidential intern Monica Lewinsky had kept with Clinton's semen residue on it, which in turn led through a series of subsequent events to his impeachment.

== See also ==
- Parsing Bill, also known as Bill Clinton in a Blue Dress
