= Minna Antrim =

American writer

Minna Thomas Antrim (October 13, 1861, Philadelphia – 1950) was an American writer. She is famous for the remark "Experience is a good teacher, but she sends in terrific bills."

Born in Philadelphia and the daughter of William Preston Thomas and Lauretta Robbins, Minna Thomas was educated at St. Mary's Hall in Burlington, New Jersey. In 1878, she married editor W. H. Antrim. She was well known for her collection of toasts (1902) as well as for her books for children like Don'ts for Girls and Don'ts for Boys.

== Works ==
- Naked Truth and Veiled Allusions, 1901
- Dont's for Girls: A Manual of Mistakes, 1902
- A Book of Toasts, 1902
- The Wisdom of the Foolish & the Folly of the Wise, 1903
- Phases, Mazes, and Crazes of Love, 1904
- Mimic's Calendar, 1904
- At the sign of the golden calf, 1905
- Knocks Witty Wise "and"___________, 1905
- Sweethearts and Beaux, 1905
- Don'ts for Bachelors and Old Maids, 1908
- Jester Life and his Marionettes, 1908
