= Diana, Princess of Wales (Nelson Shanks portrait) =

1996 painting by Nelson Shanks

- Artist: Nelson Shanks
- Year: 1996
- Type: Portrait
- Dimensions: 160 cm × 100 cm (64 in × 40 in)
- Location: Althorp

Diana, Princess of Wales is a 1996 painting of Diana, Princess of Wales by the American artist Nelson Shanks. The painting was first shown at Hirschl & Adler Gallery in New York City, 24 April to 28 June 1996, and now hangs in the Princess's ancestral home at Althorp.

== Description ==
The portrait was commissioned in 1994 and completed in 1996 around the time when Diana's divorce from Prince Charles was finalised. It was originally on display at her home at Kensington Palace before being moved to her ancestral home Althorp following her death. Diana sat for the portrait around 30 to 50 times over 35 hours at the Tite Street studio in London.

During the sitting the process, Shanks also produced a head study of the princess that shows her looking downwards while wearing her green velvet halter dress by Catherine Walker. In the final full-length portrait, however, Diana is depicted wearing a white blouse and blue skirt. The head study was auctioned at Sotheby's in 2022 and sold for $201,600. It was then displayed at Masterpiece London Art Fair from 30 June to 6 July 2022. The gallerist described the oil sketch as "extraordinarily rare" as it captured "both the public and private character simultaneously. Shank's sketch uniquely fuses Diana's glamour with the affecting pathos of her final years."
