= Alice Lakey =

American activist

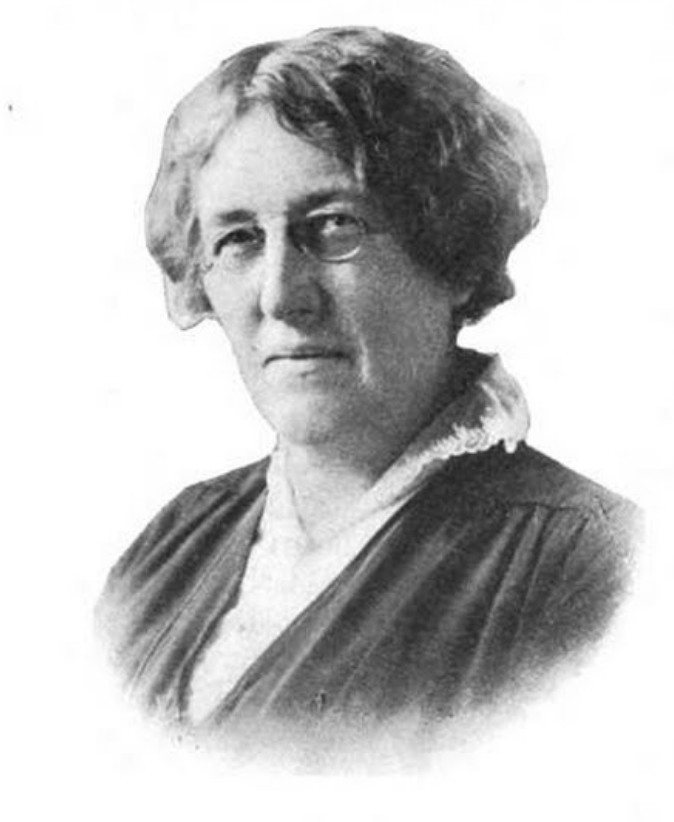
- Born: October 14, 1857; Shanesville, Ohio, US
- Died: June 18, 1935 (aged 77); Cranford, New Jersey, US
- Occupations: Food safety activist, Pure Food and Drug Act

Alice Lakey (October 14, 1857 – June 18, 1935) was an American activist supporting the Pure Foods Movement and the use of insurance. Lakey lectured, wrote, and lobbied extensively. She was instrumental in obtaining passage of the federal Pure Food and Drug Act of 1906, and in creating state laws to protect the quality of milk in 1909. At a time when women were not allowed to vote, she was credited with mobilizing over one million women to write letters in support of the food and drug act through her work with women's groups.

== Early life and family ==
Alice Lakey was born on October 14, 1857, to Charles D. Lakey and Ruth (Jacques) Lakey of Shanesville, Ohio. Her father was an American, her mother from England. Originally a Methodist minister, Charles later worked in insurance. Alice's mother died when she was six, and her father remarried, to painter Emily Jane Jackson. The family moved to Cleveland, Ohio, to Chicago, Illinois, and finally to New York City.

Lakey was educated in public schools in Chicago, and from 1872 to 1874 at St. Mary's Hall, Burlington, New Jersey. At that time, St. Mary's was an Episcopal boarding school for girls, the first school in the United States to offer a classical education comparable to that for boys.

In her twenties, Alice Lakey studied voice in Florence, Paris, and London, chaperoned by her stepmother Emily. A mezzo-soprano, Lakey was favorably reviewed for her performances in London. She returned to the United States in 1888, intending to pursue a career in opera, but became ill. She was an invalid for most of her thirties, from 1888 to 1896.

== Cranford Village Improvement Association ==
In 1896, Charles, Emily and Alice Lakey moved to Cranford, New Jersey. Alice's health improved and she began teaching voice to pupils in Cranford and in New York. When Emily died in October 1896, Alice took responsibility for management of the household. Her father was picky about food, and Alice became interested in food science and health.

Alice joined the Cranford Village Improvement Association's Domestic Science Unit and soon became president of the whole association. Among the many initiatives she supported were public trash containers, garbage collection, town snow plows, the town's first fire department, and its first grade school.

On behalf of the association Lakey contacted the Department of Agriculture to request that someone speak to the association about tainted food. In 1903, Harvey Wiley, chief of the Bureau of Chemistry, came to Cranford to speak. Wiley was building a coalition to support a national food and drug law. Over a hundred such laws had been proposed but none had passed.

== Activism on a national level ==
=== The Pure Foods Movement ===
Lakey became an enthusiastic supporter of Harvey Wiley's campaign for a national food and drug law, and began traveling and lecturing to women's groups. Lakey convinced the Cranford association and the New Jersey State Federation of Women's Clubs to petition Congress to enact federal legislation for the Pure Food and Drug Act.

Lakey asked the National Consumers League to support the cause. They created an investigation committee to find out about the food and the conditions of the workers producing it, which was eventually known as the Pure Food Committee. Lakey was appointed the head of the Pure Food Committee in 1905, serving 1905–1912.

As representatives of an "inner circle of strategists", Alice Lakey, Harvey Wiley, and four other men met with President Theodore Roosevelt in 1905. Roosevelt asked them to present signed letters in support of the act to Congress, saying he would then help them to pass the bill. Due to the efforts of Lakey and others, over one million women wrote letters supporting the act. On June 30, 1906, President Roosevelt signed the bill, and the Pure Food and Drug Act was enacted.

Lakey continued to actively advocate through meetings, letters, and public speaking. She lobbied on behalf of Wiley and his policies, encouraging the implementation and strengthening of the Pure Food and Drug Act. She also worked in support of the standardization of weights and measures, an area where legislation was extremely complicated. She spoke out strongly against legislation that would have allowed the marketing of adulterated goods across state borders without labeling.

The greatest menace to the public health lies in the fact that milk entering into interstate commerce may be adulterated by the addition of water or any other unlike substance. Glucose may be added to molasses, to maple and cane syrups and to honey; nut shells of all kinds to spices and peppers; flour to mustard; starch to cocoa and chocolate; alum, starch aud calcium sulphate to cream of tartar; vanilla extract may be made of tonka bean or any other cheaper substitute; ... Such goods will need no labels stating that they are compound, or imitation, if the Bowers decision is signed. – Alice Lakey, 1909

She also lobbied for the protection of milk. In 1906, she was the only woman to be appointed as a charter member of the New York Milk Committee, where she served with Franklin D. Roosevelt. Lakey influenced the writing of legislation at the state level by Senator Joseph S. Frelinghuysen. A bill to legally establish a Medical Milk Commission that could certify the safety and quality of milk was introduced in the New Jersey Senate by Frelinghuysen and approved on April 21, 1909. It became a model for other states, and helped to counter weaknesses at the federal level of legislation.

In 1912, Lakey helped to establish the American Pure Food League, of which she became executive secretary. Beginning in 1914, she edited the pure foods section of The Osteopathic Magazine.

In 1933, Lakey re-established the American Pure Food League, which had become dormant, to lobby for the Federal Food, Drug, and Cosmetic Act of 1938.

Lakey was a supporter of women's suffrage. She was one of the vice-presidents of the Equal Franchise Society of New Jersey, which was formed in 1910. Women obtained the vote in the United States in 1920.

=== Insurance ===
Lakey was an advocate for insurance, publishing various papers and reports. She managed and edited the magazine Insurance, a weekly publication established by her father in 1883. She became its owner following his death on August 24, 1919.

In 1921 she served on a special insurance investigation committee for the General Federation of Women's Clubs and was appointed as a "special representative on insurance" to its Department of Applied Education. She advocated for the use of insurance as a way to save for the college education of one's children. In 1932, Lakey served as president of the League of Insurance Women.

== Awards, honors, and archives ==
Lakey was elected to the National Institute of Social Sciences. She contributed to its journal and served as chair of the New Jersey State Liberty Medal Committee of the National Institute of Social Sciences.

Lakey was the first woman to be listed in Who's Who.

Archival materials about Lakey and her work are part of the Harvey W. Wiley Papers and the National Consumer League Papers in the Library of Congress. Materials are also included in the records of the United States Department of Agriculture and the Food and Drug Administration in the National Archives and Records Administration and the Washington National Records Center.

== Death ==
Alice Lakey died on June 18, 1935, having suffered from a heart ailment. Services were held at her home, led by the rector of Trinity Episcopal Church, Cranford, of which she was a member. Alice Lakey was buried in Fairview Cemetery, Westfield, New Jersey.

== Additional sources ==
- Anderson, Oscar Edward (1958). The health of a nation; Harvey W. Wiley and the fight for pure food. Chicago: University of Chicago Press.
- Bird, Caroline (1976). Enterprising women (1st ed.). New York: Norton. ISBN 9780393087246.
- Young, James Harvey (1989). Pure food : securing the Federal Food and Drugs Act of 1906. Princeton, N.J.: Princeton University Press. ISBN 9781400860326.
- Janssen, Wallace F. (1990). "Clubwomen and Their Fight for Food and Drug Laws". GFWC Clubwoman. 68 (June/July): 16–18, 44–45.
