= Parsing Bill =

2012 painting by Petrina Ryan-Kleid

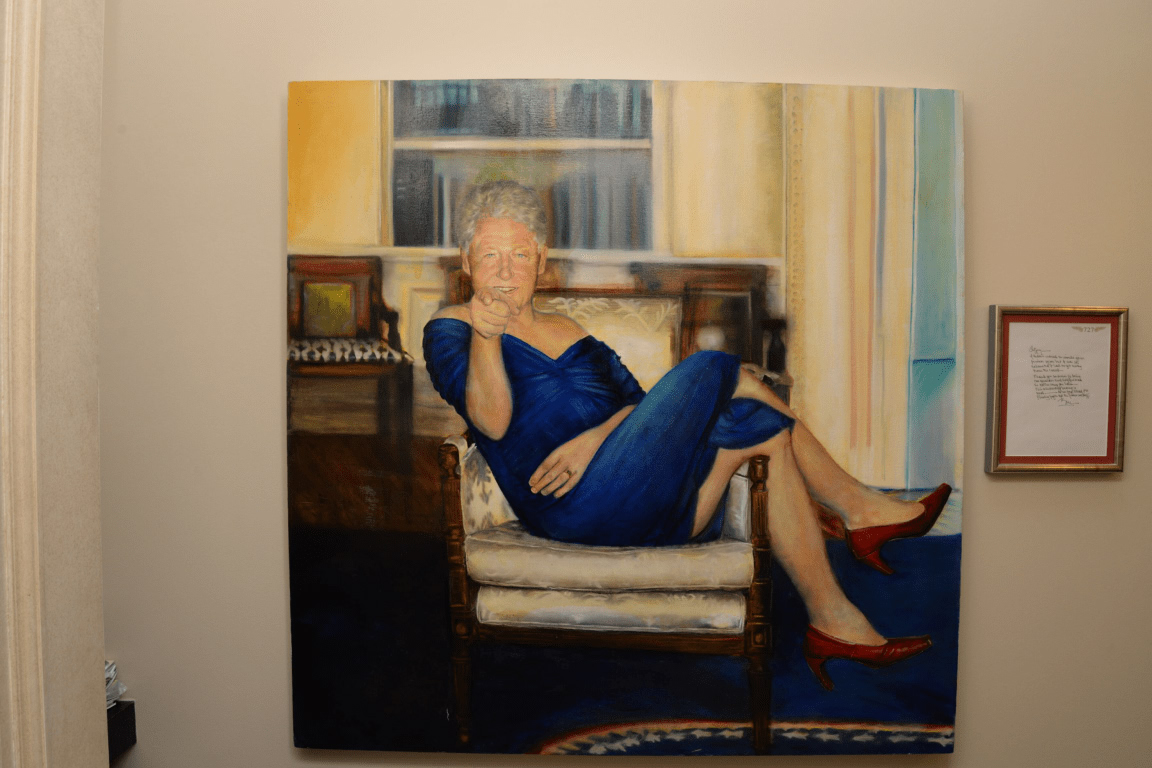
The painting photographed by the FBI at Epstein's house in New York City on 6 July 2019

Parsing Bill is a 2012 oil painting by Australian artist Petrina Ryan-Kleid. A work of satire and parody created while the artist was a student, it depicts the former U.S. president Bill Clinton in a blue dress and red high heels, reclining across an armchair and pointing directly at the viewer. The painting was later owned by Jeffrey Epstein and displayed near the entrance of his townhouse in New York City. It came to public attention during investigations shortly before and after Epstein's death in 2019.

Ryan-Kleid moved from Australia to the United States to study art. She created the painting for her master's thesis while completing a two-year Master of Fine Arts degree at the New York Academy of Art. Photographs from 2012 show Christophe Nayal, a long-time model at the academy, posed in the position depicted in the painting, with his legs crossed over the arm of a chair and pointing outward. Ryan-Kleid later added Clinton's face, along with background elements including walls, a bookcase and a blue carpet referencing the Oval Office during the Clinton presidency.

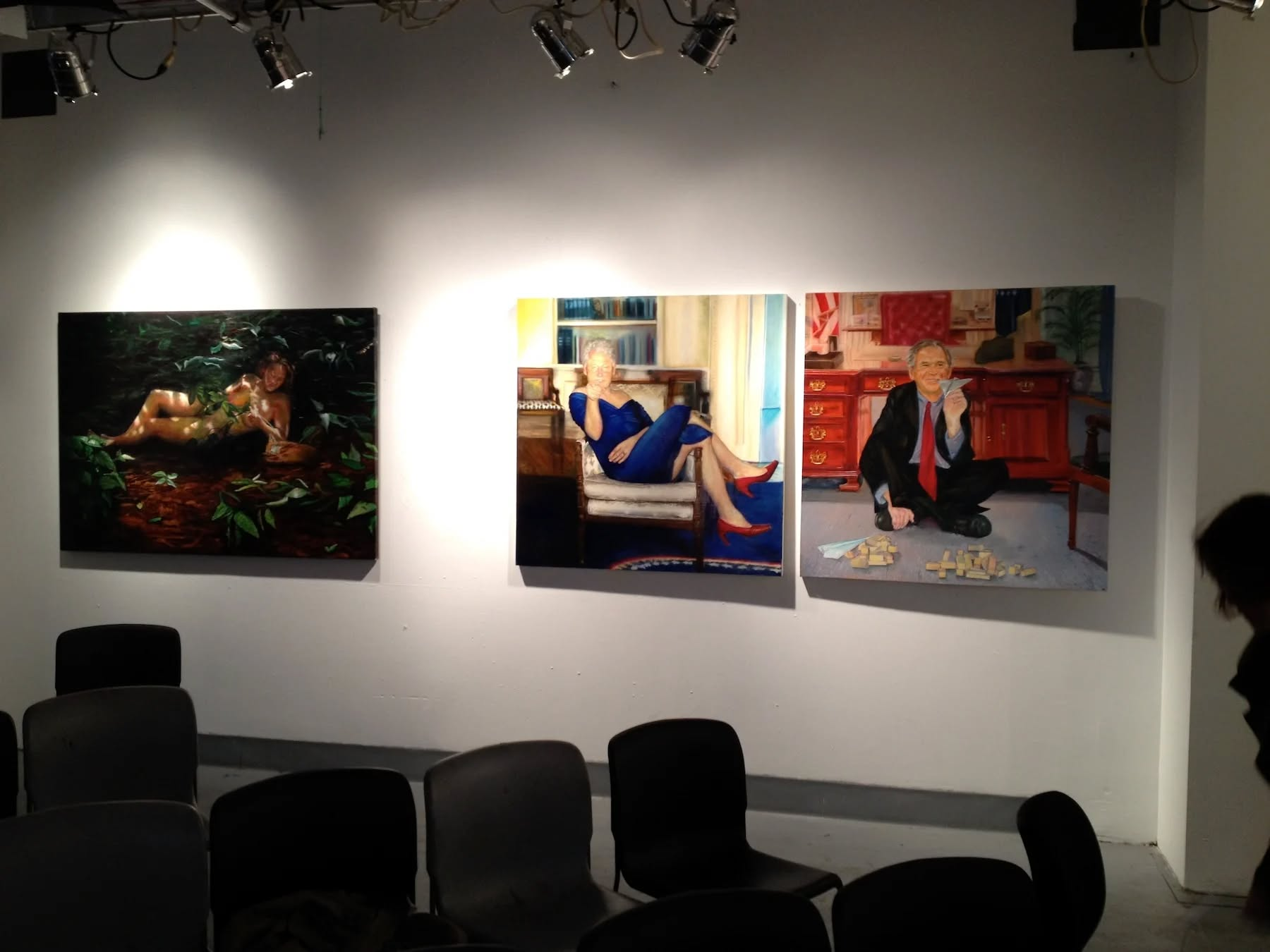
Paintings by Petrina Ryan-Kleid displayed at her 2012 MFA thesis exhibition at the New York Academy of Art. From left: A Fox in Central Park, Parsing Bill, and War Games.

The painting was exhibited at Ryan-Kleid's 2012 MFA thesis exhibition at the New York Academy of Art alongside other works, including a companion painting titled War Games, which depicts another former US president, George W. Bush, seated on the floor of the Oval Office playing with paper planes amid fallen Jenga towers. Both paintings were part of a satirical series examining how opposing political parties portray rival presidents.

Ryan-Kleid later explained that the two works parody the way political parties caricature their opponents. The paintings reference significant controversies associated with the two presidencies: Parsing Bill refers to the blue dress that became key evidence in the Clinton–Lewinsky scandal of 1998–99, while War Games references the political response to the September 11 attacks in 2001 and the subsequent Iraq War beginning in 2003.

Parsing Bill was exhibited and sold at the Tribeca Ball in April 2012 to raise funds for the academy, at a time when War Games had not yet been completed. The location of Parsing Bill was not known for several years, but some reports suggest it was acquired by Epstein in 2012. Photographs taken in 2019 show the painting hanging on a wall near the entrance of Herbert N. Straus House, Epstein's Upper East Side townhouse in New York City. Epstein had previously served as a board member of the New York Academy of Art from 1987 to 1994; he was convicted and imprisoned for child sex offences in 2008 and arrested again in July 2019, one month before his death.

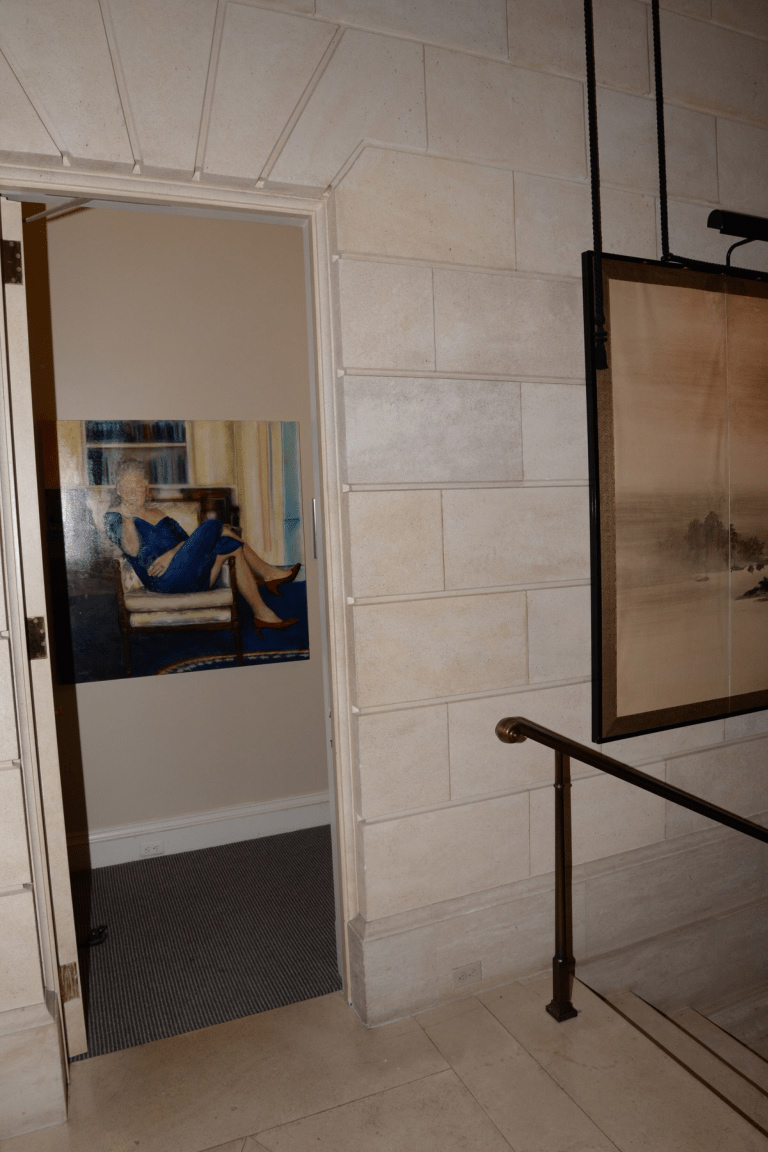

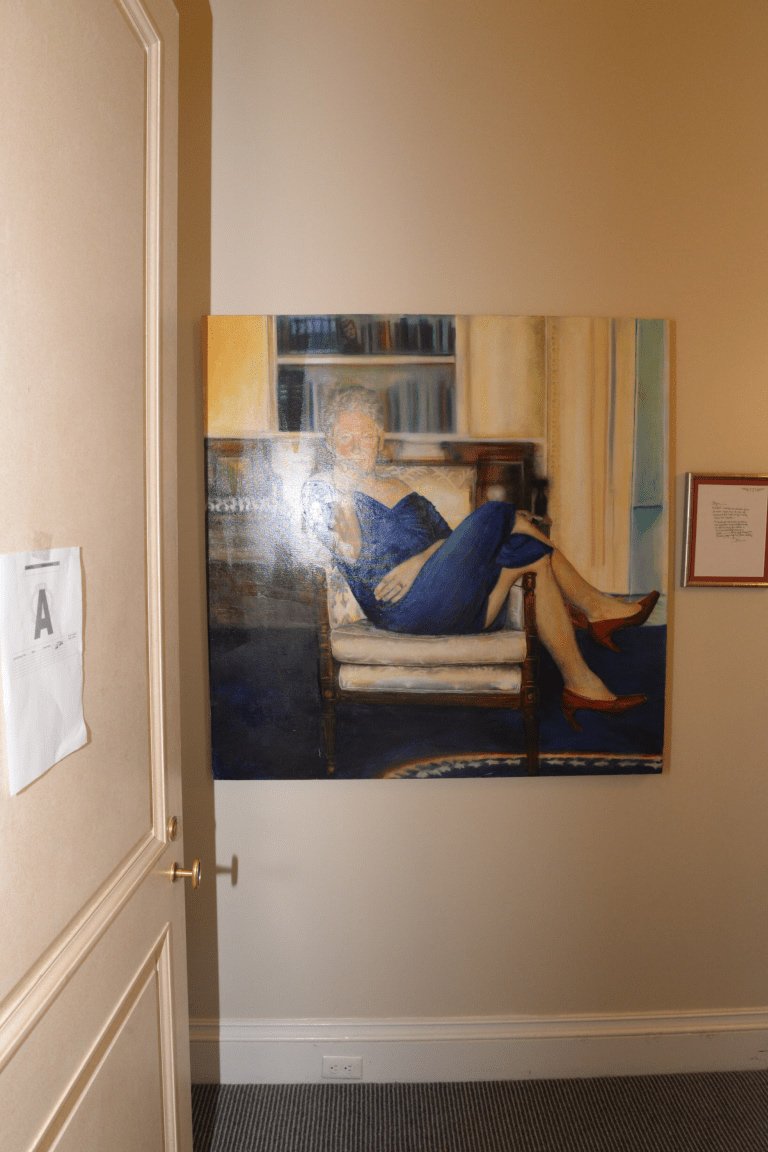

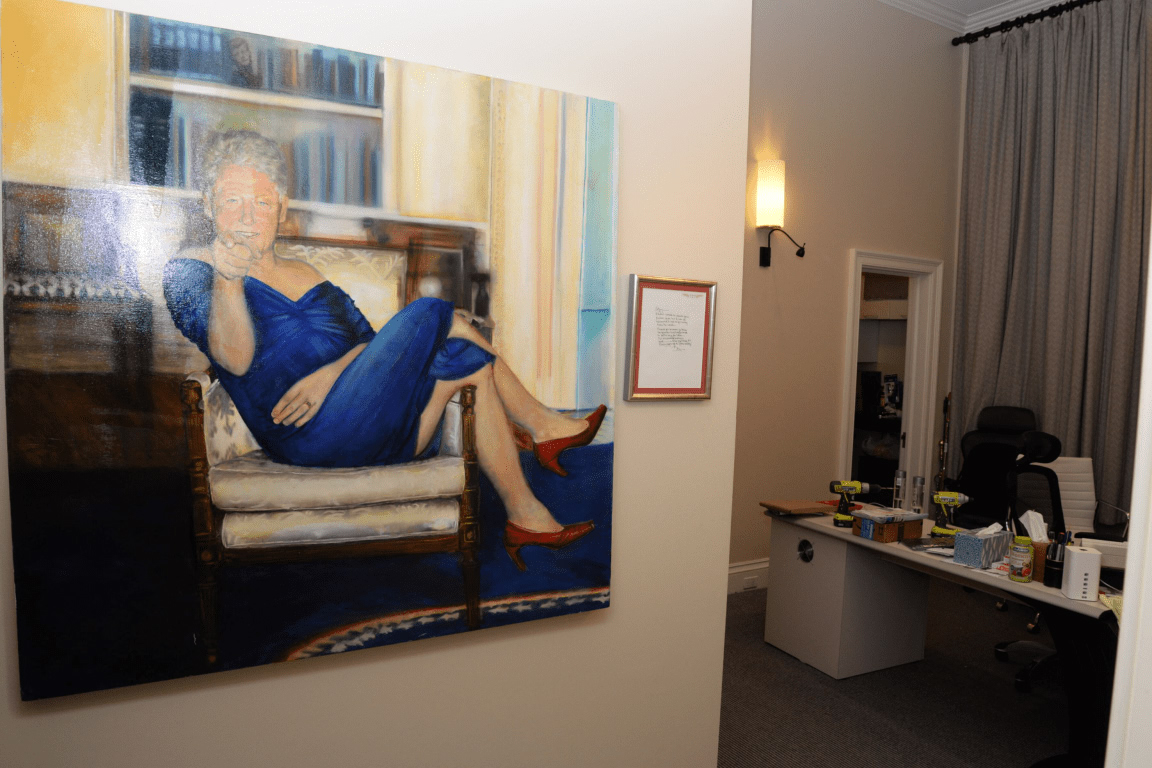

== See also ==
- Bill Clinton (portrait)
