= Belden Stratford =

Apartment building in Chicago, Illinois

- U.S. National Register of Historic Places
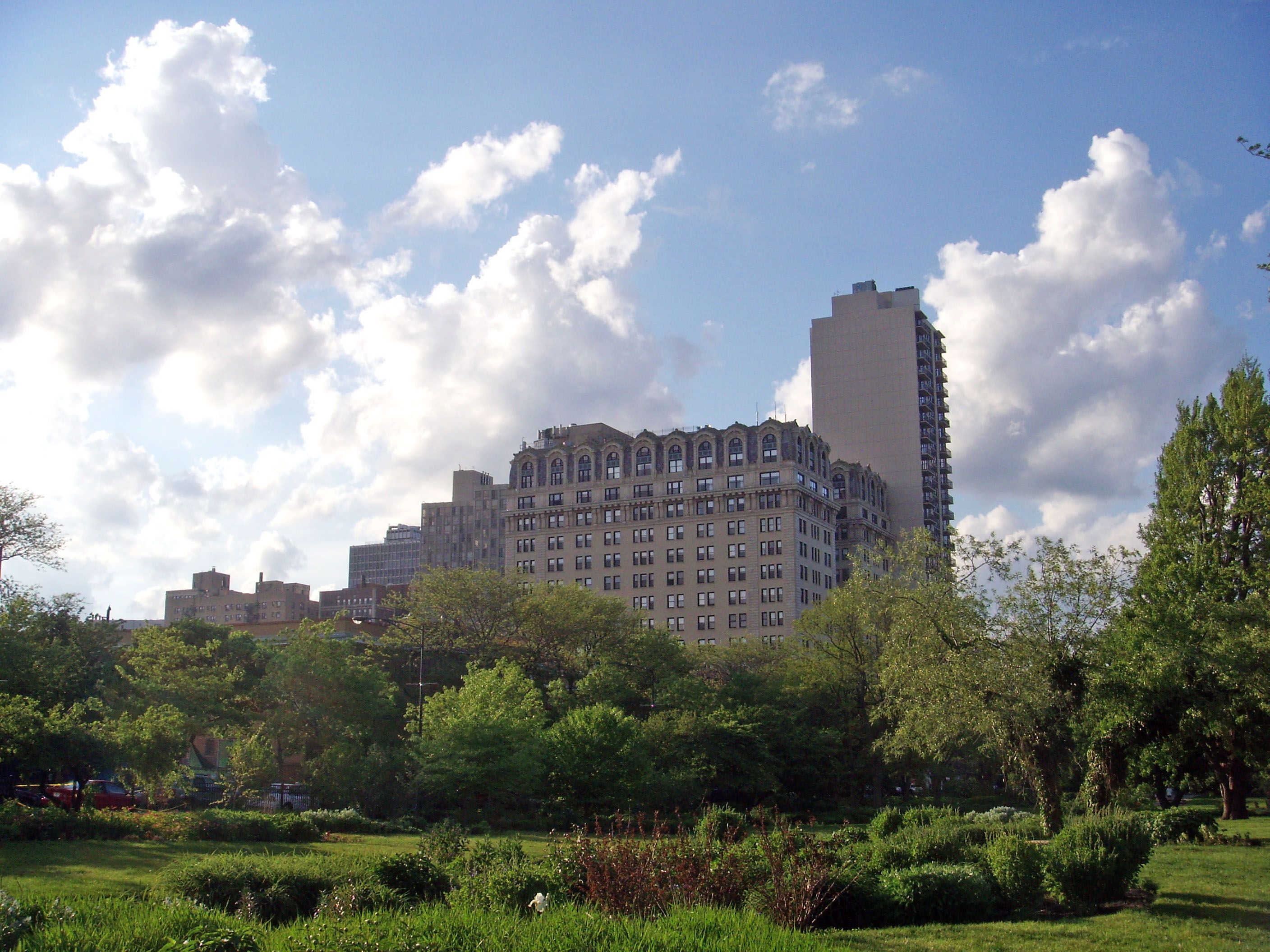

- Location within Chicago metropolitan area Location within Illinois Location within the United States
- Location: 2300 N. Lincoln Park West, Chicago, Illinois
- Coordinates: 41°55′26″N 87°38′12″W
- Area: less than one acre
- Built: 1923
- Architect: Fridstein, Meyer
- Architectural style: Beaux Arts
- NRHP reference No.: 92000485
- Added to NRHP: May 11, 1992

The Belden Stratford is an apartment building and former hotel in the Lincoln Park neighborhood of Chicago. It is located across the street from the Lincoln Park Zoo and Lincoln Park Conservatory.

The structure was built in the 1920s and renovated between 1989 and 1990. Notable guests over the years included Louis Armstrong and Gloria Swanson.

It is now managed by Waterton on behalf of the current owner, the Mansueto Office. Previously, In 2011 IRMCO Properties & Management owned and managed the Belden Stratford. It was eventually sold to the Laramar Group who owned it until late 2018.
