= Nelson Shanks =

American painter

- Self-portrait by Shanks
- Born: John Nelson Shanks; December 23, 1937; Rochester, New York, U.S.
- Died: August 28, 2015 (aged 77); Andalusia, Pennsylvania, U.S.
- Occupations: Artist, painter
- Spouse: Leona McShea Shanks (m. 1989)

John Nelson Shanks (December 23, 1937 – August 28, 2015) was an American artist and painter. His best known works include his portrait of Diana, Princess of Wales, first shown at Hirschl & Adler Gallery in New York City, April 24 to June 28, 1996, and the portrait of president Bill Clinton for the National Portrait Gallery.

Shanks had been on the faculty of the Memphis Academy of Arts, the Art Institute of Chicago, the Art Students League of New York, the National Academy of Design, an his own Studio Incamminati and was a resident of Andalusia, Pennsylvania. He was an honorary member of the American Society of Classical Realism Guild of Artists.

Shanks was a painter, teacher and art historian influential in the revival of Classical Realism in the United States. His portraits of royalty, politicians and celebrities added to his international profile as one of the foremost contemporary figurative painters. Shanks' philosophies and skills were shared through his teaching at various public and private institutions. In 2002, he founded Studio Incamminati in Philadelphia, Pennsylvania, with his wife, Leona Shanks; an academy dedicated to the study, practice and spread of realist art using the philosophy and techniques espoused by Shanks.

== Early life ==
Shanks was born in Rochester, New York. He lived in Wilmington, Delaware, for most of his childhood. He studied at the Kansas City Art Institute with Wilbur Niewald and in New York City at the National Academy of Design and the Art Students League. At New York's Art Students League, he earned his tuition serving as a monitor in classes taught by Robert Brackman, Ivan Olinsky and Edwin Dickinson. He studied privately with John Koch and Henry Hensche. Grants from the Elizabeth Greenshields Foundation and the Stacey Foundation allowed him to study in Florence with Pietro Annigoni at the Accademia de Belle Arti. He then taught in Memphis, Chicago and Pennsylvania, where he maintained a studio for over three decades.

== Career ==
=== Commissioned work ===
His portrait of Diana, Princess of Wales was completed in 1996. The painting was first shown at Hirschl & Adler Gallery in New York City, April 24 to June 28, 1996, and now hangs in the Princess's ancestral home at Althorp. His other commissions include John Paul II, President Ronald Reagan, President Bill Clinton, and Luciano Pavarotti.

=== Exhibitions ===
His work has been exhibited in museums and galleries worldwide, including the National Gallery of Art in Washington, D.C., the Royal Palace in Stockholm, Kensington Palace in London and Fortezza Firmafede in Sarzana, Italy. During the summer and fall of 2011, he had solo exhibitions in Russia at the Russian Museum, St. Petersburg and the Russian Academy of Art, Moscow. He was one of two living American painters to have been invited to exhibit at either of these venues.

Other exhibition of Shanks' work at museums and galleries have included the National Academy of Design; Hirschl & Adler Galleries; Coe Kerr and FAR Galleries in New York; Dayton Art Institute; the Butler Institute of American Art; the Art Institute of Chicago; the Philadelphia Art Alliance; the New Jersey State Museum; the National Gallery of Art; the Philadelphia Museum of Art; Oklahoma University; the University of Pennsylvania; Temple University, Jefferson University, Johns Hopkins University; the College of William and Mary; the Allentown Art Museum, the Palmer Museum of Art; George Washington University; the University of the Arts; Oglethorpe University Museum; LaSalle University; the Royal Palace, Stockholm; Kensington Palace, London; and the historic Filoli Estate, California. A major one-man exhibition was held at the Pennsylvania Academy of the Fine Arts as well as the Hirschl & Adler exhibition, "Yanks Paint Brits." In August 2004, the city of Sarzana, Italy hosted a one-man exhibition entitled 'Dal Maestro'/'From the Master', in a fifteenth-century fortress called Fortezza Firmafede. The Woodmere Art Museum, Philadelphia, Pennsylvania, also hosted an exhibition 'Dal Maestro' in October 2004, of more than fifty works by Nelson Shanks. In addition, his work is held in distinguished collections worldwide.

=== Portraiture ===
Known for his skill in capturing the complex nature of his subjects, Shanks' portraits have contributed to his reputation as one of the foremost contemporary figurative painters. Among his notable commissions are Diana, Princess of Wales, Pope John Paul II for the Vatican Museum, Margaret Thatcher, U.S. Presidents Ronald Reagan and Bill Clinton for the National Portrait Gallery. Significant commissions also include Luciano Pavarotti for the Metropolitan Opera, Mstislav Rostropovich for the Kennedy Center, Denyce Graves for the National Portrait Gallery and the private collection at Althorp of Charles, Lord Spencer. Other portraits include King Carl XVI Gustaf of Sweden and Queen Silvia of Sweden, Queen Juliana of the Netherlands, J. Carter Brown, Katharine Graham, Judge Guido Calabresi, Surgeon General Dr. C. Everett Koop, Robert Wood Johnson, Jr., James Burke, Marcus Wallenberg, Dr. Peter Wallenberg, Ms. Darla Moore, Mr. Lionel Pincus, Mr. Jerry Speyer, Chairman of the Board, Museum of Modern Art, Arthur O. Sulzberger Sr., Chairman of the Board, Metropolitan Museum of Art, Chairman Emeritus New York Times, Mary McFadden, United States Supreme Court Justice Antonin Scalia, former New York City Mayor Michael Bloomberg and many others. There is a collection of five Nelson Shank portraits in the Huffington Library at Culver Academies. These include The Huffingtons, Michael and Arianna, The Huffington Sisters, Roy M. Huffington, Phyllis Gough Huffington, and Michael Huffington Study. Shank's work has been exhibited in museums and galleries worldwide, including the National Gallery of Art in Washington, D.C., the Royal Palace in Stockholm, Sweden, Kensington Palace in London and Fortezza Firmafede in Sarzana, Italy.

In 2015, Shanks revealed that he had hidden a secret reference to the blue dress worn by Monica Lewinsky in the official portrait of President Bill Clinton hanging in the National Portrait Gallery by way of a shadow.

== Teaching ==
Shanks was a realist, attempting to capture the essence of his subjects through acute observation and technical skill. Whether the subject was still life, landscape or figurative, the work was meant to evoke emotion and challenge the viewer to make close examination. In the words of the artist, "The Realistic painting must be nothing less than a meditation on the nature of existence and the individual. It must create likeness with the power to kindle the observer's imagination and awaken memories.... It must encompass all that the Realist painter sees before his eyes and therefore feels in his heart."

Shanks' teaching philosophy emphasized the importance of gaining knowledge and training the student to "see" with the understanding that it takes years of concentration and practice to become a highly skilled painter. Throughout his career, Shanks painted nearly every day of the year—landscape, still life, the figure and portraits. He set goals to grow and improve with every painting and encouraged students to do the same.

Shanks taught on the faculty of the Art Institute of Chicago, the Art Students League, National Academy of Design, George Washington University and the Pennsylvania Academy of the Fine Arts, where he was the first instructor in their Master Class program, instituted at the Academy after a petition to have him invited, signed by students and faculty, was submitted to the President of the Academy. He established an apprentice program at his Bucks County home and studio, where artists received room, board and instruction at no cost. Bo Bartlett, Eleanor Greaves and Michael Lane were among the approximately 30 different artists to work as his apprentices over the years. In the late 1990s, he launched a successful series of workshops in response to the growing need for serious art instruction. The need for students to immerse themselves deeply in his teaching principles was indicated by the high demand for and over-subscription to these workshops, which led to the decision to open a full-time atelier program in 2002, named Studio Incamminati, which can be translated from the Italian as "those who are progressing". The name also aims to invoke the spirit and practices of its namesake—the studio founded by the Renaissance artist Annibale Carracci.

Nelson, and his wife, Leona Shanks, founded Studio Incamminati to provide a place where artists devoted to realism could study painting and acquire other skills necessary for successful artistic careers. Nelson Shanks was committed to changing the world's view of art and through Studio Incamminati attracted people willing to devote time to this cause.

== Reception ==
=== Recognition and awards ===
In 1996, Shanks was awarded the "Sargent Medal" for Lifetime Achievement by the American Society of Portrait Artists

In 2006, Governor Edward Rendell presented Shanks the Governor’s Distinguished Arts Award, which recognizes a Pennsylvania artist of international fame or renown whose creations and contributions enrich the Commonwealth. Among those contributions noted were his lifelong commitment to teaching and his establishment of Studio Incamminati.

In 2009, Shanks was awarded the Gold Medal for Lifetime Achievement by the Portrait Society of America.

In 2011, for "transcendent work" and contributions to culture, the members of the Russian Academy, the centuries-old institution that governs art education and exhibitions in the Russian Federation, voted to make Shanks an honorary member of their ranks.

== Death and legacy ==
Shanks died of prostate cancer at his home in Andalusia, Pennsylvania, on August 28, 2015, at the age of 77.

His son Alexander Shanks (b. 1996) is also a painter.
