= Elizabeth Searcy =

American artist

- Born: 1877; Memphis, Tennessee
- Died: 1965 (aged 87–88); Memphis, Tennessee
- Education: Miss Higbee's School, Memphis. Art Student League, New York City.
- Known for: Creating commissions for First Lady Eleanor Roosevelt.
- Style: Etchings, Watercolors

Elizabeth Searcy (1877–1965) was an American artist from Memphis, Tennessee. Known for her commissioned portraits of President Roosevelt, she also painted different views of the White House and of Roosevelt's birthplace.

== Biography ==
Searcy was born in Memphis in 1877. She attended Miss Higbee's School and went to Philadelphia to study art. She specialized in etchings and watercolors. Searcy was also an art instructor at St. Mary's Hall in Burlington, New Jersey. Searcy developed a relationship with Eleanor Roosevelt, for whom she did commissioned work that was then given as gifts to President Roosevelt. Eventually, Searcy would move back to Memphis, TN where she died in 1965.

== Museum collections ==
Searcy's artwork is included in the permanent collections of the Memphis Brooks Museum of Art, the Metropolitan Museum of Art and the Johnson Collection in Spartanburg, South Carolina.
