= Studio Incamminati =

Art school in Philadelphia, Pennsylvania

Studio Incamminati is a private school for Contemporary Realist Art in Philadelphia, Pennsylvania. It was founded by Nelson Shanks and his wife, Leona Shanks in 2002 and is accredited by the National Association of Schools of Art and Design. According to artist/scholar Patrick Connors, the school's mission and curriculum are inspired by the "eclectic ideal" of its namesake, the Accademia degli Incamminati, founded in 1582 by the three Carracci cousins: Agostino, Annibale and Ludovico. Studio Incamminati's purpose according to Shanks, is to "produce great competence and the great painters of the next generation by bringing back the skill of seeing and the skill of craftsmanship." Among realist painters, the school is recognized for its extensive palette The school has been praised by realist art champions including the late Gordon Wetmore, founding member of the Portrait Society of America, who called it one of the "exceptional examples among a number of excellent schools which have been instrumental in training a growing population of young artists..."
