= Alyssa Monks =

American painter

Alyssa Monks (born 1977) is an American painter currently based in Brooklyn. She specializes in large oil paintings and is recognized both in the United States and Europe for her work featuring figures obscured by water, steam, and vinyl. Her notable series of work centering around figures in bathrooms, tubs, and showers garnered attention from the worldwide art community and the press.

== Personal life ==
A native of Ridgewood, New Jersey, Monks was born in 1977 as the youngest of eight children (six older brothers and one sister). Her mother, a potter and artist herself, was supportive of Monks's interest in art and found ways to help her cultivate her love for the arts. By eight years old, Monks was taking general art and painting classes. She is based in Williamsburg, Brooklyn.

== Education ==
After graduating from Immaculate Heart Academy in 1995, Monks went on to attend The New School in New York and Montclair State University before earning her B.A. at Boston College in 1999. Monks went on to study painting at Lorenzo de’ Medici in Florence, Italy and then returned to the United States to earn her M.F.A. from the New York Academy of Art, in their Graduate School of Figurative Art in 2001. In 2006, Monks completed an artist in residency at Fullerton College in California.

== Work ==
In Monks’s early works the environment comes forward, with some of her paintings featuring interiors without figures, or interiors in which the figure is only a small element. Her eye for these spaces explores the figure as both a form and a place. As her work evolved, her figures become more complete than their portrait counterparts, as Monks felt that she needed to be “as realistic as possible; It had to be specific and believable” as “this was the place where (she) was isolated and in total control.”

Monks then preferred to alter the audience’s sense of space and immersion in her artworks. While her representation of the figure is often almost perfectly photographic in its depiction, she blurs and fuses layers of space to create immersive abstraction that feels uniquely intimate and provocative; she often includes the use of glass, clear vinyl, water, steam, and shallow spaces to distinguish a nearly invisible line between the foreground and backgrounds of her pieces. Monks’ most famous pieces come from her decade-long water series, where these elements are the most prevalent and recognizable. Monk's compositions also exhibit a quality of tension because of the way she of her use of the impasto technique.

However, this specificity and photorealistic detail would not last. On October 8, 2011, Monks’ mother was diagnosed with lung cancer that had spread throughout the rest of her body, succumbing to it a year and three weeks after her diagnosis on October 26, 2012. When she returned to painting, Smear was one of her first pieces. “It’s like a release of everything that was unravelling in me,” she stated. “That safe, very, very carefully rendered safe place that I created in all of my other paintings was a myth; it didn’t work.” This tragic loss caused Monks to re-evaluate her process entirely, moving from the enclosed space of the bathroom to outside in the woods and integrating a chaotic, abstraction of nature into her work instead of the pristine and controlled layering of space. She even left paintings outside, exposed to the woods over night, just to see what kind of affect it would have — anything to inspire her to paint again and rekindle her love for art.

In March 2018 a New York Times article was written about Monks's artistic contributions to FX's hit TV show The Americans. For its final season, Monks created the paintings and drawings used on set for the character Erica, an artist wife of a nuclear arms dealer who is bedridden with cancer. Monks's work can be seen in the background of a critical scene for the final season of the show, in which the main character Elizabeth Jennings enters Erica's bedroom, disguised as an aid. Elizabeth is known for her inability to show emotion — the use of Monk's paintings was to disrupt this trait and serve as a turning point for the character. The show runners sought paintings for Elizabeth to see which, "unconsciously, like sleeper agents, suggesting the kinds of intense emotions that she will never let herself feel. They had to be realistic, but not too realistic, passionate, but not over the top. They had to look as though they could have been painted in the 1980s".

== Exhibitions ==
Monks has shown her work across the globe, including one show, called Resolution, which ran in spring 2016 at the Forum Gallery in New York City. Other notable shows and collections that include her work are the Kunst Museum in Ahlen, Germany, the National Academy Museum of Fine Arts’ show Reconfiguring the Body in American Art, 1820–2009, as well as the private collections of Eric Fischl, Howard Tullman, Gerrity Lansing, Danielle Steel, Alec Baldwin, and Luciano Benetton.

== Awards ==
- Ranked 16 out of 30 in a list of the most influential women artist alive today by the graphic design degree hub.
- Awarded the Elizabeth Greenshields Foundation Grant for painting in 2003, and 2006.
- Won a travel grant from the Forbes Foundation to the Chateaux Balleroy in Normandy, France in 2001.

== Scholarships ==
- Academic Scholarship Award for the New York Academy of Art awarded in 1999 (M.F.A.)
- Awarded the Artplosion grant and the Stylus grant for Boston College in 1999 (B.A.)

== Digital galleries ==
- Artsy Gallery
- Personal Web Gallery

== Other sources ==
- "The Rustic Renewal of Brooklyn Artist Alyssa Monks". The Atlantic. 2015-10-20.
- "Paintings". Alyssa Monks.
- "Alyssa Monks". HocTok.com.
- "30 Most Influential Women Artists Alive Today". Graphicdesigndegreehub.com.
- "Interview with Alyssa Monks". Artophilia.com.
- "Connection | Dirty Laundry". Dirtylaundrymag.com. 2015-03-05.
- "Alyssa Monks: How loss helped one artist find beauty in imperfection | TED Talk". TED.com.
- "Obscuring Atmospheres And Pushing The Complexities Of Painting Language To Find The Line Between Abstraction And Illusion Meet Alyssa Monks". Art Jobs.
