= Xenia Hausner =

Austrian painter and stage designer

- Born: 1951 (age 74–75); Vienna, Austria
- Occupations: Painter, stage designer

Xenia Hausner (born 1951 in Vienna) is an Austrian painter and stage designer.

== Life ==
Hausner was born into a family of artists. Her father was the Austrian painter Rudolf Hausner.

From 1972 to 1976, she studied stage design at the Academy of Arts in Vienna and at the Royal Academy of Dramatic Art in London. From 1977 to 1992, she designed sets for theatre, opera and film at the Burgtheater in Vienna, Salzburg Festival, Royal Opera House Covent Garden in London, Theâtre Royal de la Monnaie in Brussels etc., as well as a stage design for a new production of Richard Strauss's opera “Der Rosenkavalier” in 2020 staged by André Heller at the Staatsoper Unter den Linden, Berlin. Since 1992, Hausner has been working exclusively as a painter. Her works have been shown at numerous galleries, art fairs and museums. She lives and works in Berlin and Vienna.

== Work ==
=== Stage sets ===
Her first stage sets were collages built from material collected from condemned houses, junk yards and garbage dumps. She used this raw material to assemble a theatrical space that sprung to life in the clash between naturalistic clarity and abstract interpretation. Her favorite configuration was the oxymoron, a correlation of opposites, a concentrated unification of elements caught in centrifugal chaos.

=== Painting ===
As of 1990, she began concentrating on painting. People are at the center of her focus. Her images are enigmatic, the situations she depicts ambiguous. Hausner's large-formatted works are societal descriptions, the situations purposely fragmentary, snapshots from daily life. In contrast to the classical portrait, the characters in her images play the roles of people other than themselves. They are cast like actors in a play. Her style is expressive and her palette brims over with strong colours, a fact that is apparent in the flesh tones of her protagonists. In addition to the dominance of female figures, fiction and invention are her central themes. The lie that evokes the truth is her specialty and is painted, preserved and composed in images. Hausner paints invented stories the viewer can identify with his or her own life. Staging is also the main component of her retrospective exhibition, “True Lies” at the Albertina Museum Vienna. Hausner works on paper and mixed-media as well. She transforms large-formatted photos into paintings, incorporating various materials depending on the specific medium she is working in. In this way, painting and photography merge, are transported to the limits of current artistic awareness. Using a variety of techniques, she concentrates images and constructs a new reality. Producing special edition art works on hand-made paper has become a new field of experimentation for Hausner. These unique limited editions deal with subjects known from her paintings, but the images are reinvented through technique and the medium and evolve into an independent artistic form. While preparing for her exhibition, "Damage", at the Shanghai Art Museum in 2011, she became intensively interested in Asiatic, especially Chinese motifs and began incorporating them into her personal artistic DNA: clear evidence of the global networking in contemporary art.

=== Photography ===
In addition to painting, photography is a major component in her work. Hausner interlaces the history and potential inherent in both these image media in a multi-faceted manner, implicitly bringing into her painting not only the principles of photography but consolidating elements of film as well. Hausner stages photos as a basis for painting. She produces and directs her photographic scenarios in her studio, using one or more characters. The choice of a cut, the sense of the fragmentary, the actual montage and the drastic staging of light according to color ultimately contributes to the intense individual atmospheric character of the image.

=== Projects ===
Hausner is active in the "Women without Borders" movement and documents through her camera women, active in the struggle against terrorism. She is strongly interested in architectural projects, for example the mantling of the Ringturm in Vienna in 2011, or in designing church windows (Kilian Church in Heilbronn, St. Johannis Church in Gehrden, St. Johannes and St. Laurentius Cathedral in Merseburg).

== Awards ==
- 2000 – Ernst Barlach Prize

== Notable exhibitions ==
- 2023: "Xenia Hausner. Female Measure", Galleri Würth, Hagan, Norway
- 2022: "Xenia Hausner. Unintended Beauty", KÖNIG Galerie, Berlin
- 2022: "Xenia Hausner. True Lies", Museum Franz Gertsch, Burgdorf, Switzerland
- 2021: "Xenia Hausner. True Lies", Albertina Museum, Vienna
- 2020: "Xenia Hausner – This will have been another happy day!", Palais Populaire, Berlin
- 2020: "Schiele – Rainer – Kokoschka / Der Welt (m)eine Ordnung geben", Landesgalerie Niederösterreich, Krems
- 2020: "A.E.I.O.U. – Österreichische Aspekte in der Sammlung Würth", Galleri Würth, Hagan, Norway
- 2020: "Freunde. Hunde und Menschen", Bayrisches Nationalmuseum, Munich
- 2020: 8th Moscow International Biennale of Contemporary Art, State Tretyakov Gallery
- 2019: "Xenia Hausner", Forum Gallery New York
- 2019: "Xenia Hausner. Behind The Scenes", Austrian Cultural Forum New York
- 2019: "Body extended", Shepherd W&K Galleries, New York
- 2019: "Juntos Aparte", Bienalsur – South America's Art Biennale, Cucuta Colombia
- 2019: "Xenia Hausner – Displaced – Storie in Movimento" Palazzo Ducale di Mantova, Museo Archeologico Nazionale, Italy
- 2019: "Warhol bis Richter", Albertina Contemporary Art, Wien
- 2019: "The Still Life in Contemporary Art" Galleri Würth, Norway
- 2019: "Blickwechsel: Neue Frauenbilder" Galerie von Braunbehrens, Stuttgart
- 2019: "Frauen über Frauen" Galerie Deschler, Berlin
- 2018: "Die Geste" Ludwiggalerie, Schloss Oberhausen, Deutschland
- 2018: "Guernica – Ikone des Friedens" Hofburg Innsbruck
- 2018: "Objects of Desire" Xenia Hausner & Dorothee Golz, Galerie 422, Gmunden, Österreich
- 2018: "Mit Haut und Haar. Frisieren, Rasieren, Verschönern", Wien Museum
- 2018: "Xenia Hausner – Shaky Times" Danubiana Meulensteen Art Museum Bratislava
- 2018: "Black & White", Galerie Deschler, Berlin
- 2017: "Monet to Picasso. The Batliner Collection", Permanent Collection, Albertina, Wien, Österreich
- 2017: "Seeing with our own eyes", Forum Gallery, New York, USA
- 2017: "Glasstress", Palazzo Franchetti, Venice
- 2017: "Xenia Hausner – Exiles" in Personal Structures: Crossing Borders, Palazzo Bembo, Venice
- 2017: „Entfesselt. Malerinnen der Gegenwart“, Schloss Achberg, Germany
- 2017: „Fleischeslust“, Galerie Deschler, Berlin
- 2017: „Modern & Contemporary Art“, Forum Gallery, New York
- 2017: „10 – Alive and Kicking“, Dominik Mersch Gallery, Sydney
- 2017: „Menagerie. An Animal Show from the Würth Collection“, Forum Würth Rorschach, CH
- 2016: “Frau im Bild – Female Portraits from the Würth Collection”, Gallery Würth, Oslo
- 2016: “Rendezvous, Meisterwerke aus der Sammlung Essl”, Essl Museum, Klosterneuburg
- 2015: "From Hockney to Holbein. The Würth Collection in Berlin", Martin-Gropius-Bau, Berlin
- 2015: "Personal Structures: Crossing Borders", Palazzo Mora, Venice
- 2015: "Soft Power", Leo Gallery, Shanghai
- 2015: "Girl, Girls, Girls", Galerie Deschler, Berlin
- 2015: Xenia Hausner "Some Hope", FO.KU.S, Innsbruck
- 2014: Xenia Hausner "Look Left – Look Right", Today Art Museum, Beijing
- 2014: Xenia Hausner "Look Left – Look Right", The Pao Galleries, Hong Kong Arts Center, Hong Kong
- 2014: "Glanzlichter. Meisterwerke zeitgenössischer Glasmalerei im Naumburger Dom", Naumburg
- 2014: "Die Andere Sicht", Essl Museum, Klosterneuburg
- 2013: "Sie. Selbst. Nackt." Paula Modersohn-Becker Museum, Bremen
- 2013: "Painting Water", Berlin Art Week, Galerie Deschler
- 2013: "A.E.I.O.U. – Österreichische Aspekte in der Sammlung Würth", Museum Würth, Künzelsau
- 2012: "ÜberLeben" Sammlung Essl, Klosterneuburg
- 2012: 5th Beijing International Art Biennial, Beijing (China)
- 2012: "Xenia Hausner – Flagrant délit", Musée Würth France, Erstein
- 2012: "Glasmalerei des 21. Jahrhunderts", Centre intern. du Vitrail, Chartres
- 2011: "Damage", Shanghai Art Museum, Shanghai
- 2011: "Sense of Family", Installation Ringturm, Vienna
- 2011: "Glasmalerei der Moderne", Badisches Landesmuseum, Karlsruhe
- 2010: "Intimacy. Bathing in Art", Kunstmuseum Ahlen, Ahlen
- 2010: "Trailblazer", Gabriele Münter Prize 2010, Martin-Gropius-Bau, Berlin
- 2009: "Sehnsucht nach dem Abbild. Das Portrait im Wandel der Zeit", Kunsthalle Krems
- 2009: "Yearning for an Image: the Portrait through the Ages", Kunsthalle Krems
- 2008: Montijo International Biennal ON EUROPE 2008, Portugal
- 2008: "You and I", Forum Gallery, New York
- 2007: "Back to the Figure", Kunsthaus, Vienna
- 2007: "Two", Galerie von Braunbehrens, Munich
- 2006: "Back to the Figure – Contemporary Painting", Kunsthalle der Hypokulturstiftung, Munich
- 2006: "Austria: 1900 – 2000 Confrontations and Continuities", Sammlung Essl, Klosterneuburg
- 2006: "Works on Paper", Forum Gallery, New York
- 2006: "Glücksfall", KunstHausWien, Wien
- 2005: "Physiognomy of the 2nd Republic", Austrian Galerie Belvedere, Vienna
- 2005: "Round Leather Worlds", Martin-Gropius-Bau, Berlin
- 2005: "Xenia Hausner – Glücksfall", Ludwig Museum, Koblenz
- 2004: "Strange. Reports of a Far Nearness", Kunstfest Weimar "Pélerinages"
- 2004: "Xenia Hausner – 2nd Nature", Charim Galerie, Vienna
- 2004: "Upper Class – Working Girl", Galerie der Stadt Salzburg
- 2003: "New Paintings", Forum Gallery, Los Angeles
- 2003: "Xenia Hauser – Lady's Choice", Galerie Deschler, Berlin
- 2002: "Xenia Hausner – Paintings", Galerie Kämpf, Basel
- 2002: "Xenia Hausner – Paintings", Galerie Hohmann, Hamburg
- 2001: "Xenia Hausner – New Works", Rupertinum, Museum der Moderne, Salzburg
- 2001: "Xenia Hausner – New Works", Galerie Thomas, Munich
- 2000: "Xenia Hausner – Heart Matters", Käthe-Kollwitz-Museum, and Russian State Museum, St. Petersburg
- 2000: "Xenia Hausner – Paintings", Ernst Barlach Museum, Hamburg Wedel
- 2000: "Heart Matters", Forum Gallery, New York
- 1999: "Figuration", Rupertinum Salzburg, Museion Bozen und Ursula Blickle Stiftung, Kraichtal
- 1998: "Reality and Dream", Berlin Galerie, Berlin
- 1998: "Xenia Hausner – Paintings", Kunsthalle, Koblenz
- 1998: "Xenia Hausner – Love Fragments", Jesuitenkirche Galerie in Aschaffenburg
- 1997: "Xenia Hausner – Love Fragments", Kunsthalle Vienna und Museum der bildenden Künste, Leipzig
- 1997: "Contemporary Art in Austria", Europäisches Währungsinstitut, Frankfurt am Main
- 1996: "Die Kraft der Bilder", Martin-Gropius-Bau, Berlin
- 1996: "The Power of Images", Martin-Gropius-Bau, Berlin
- 1996: "Human Pictures", Galerie Thomas, Munich
- 1996: "Masterpieces of Austrian ContemporaryArt", Galerie Heike Curtze, Salzburg

== Film ==
- Arte, Metropolis: Stories of Loneliness and Closeness – Visiting Xenia Hausner in her studio in Vienna, broadcast 26 January 2013 at 4:45 P.M.
- 3sat, Culture Time: Harald Wilde, Grand Dame of portrait painting – Xenia Hausner at the Essl-Museum in Kosterneuburg, 24 October 2012.1
- Arte, Metropolis: The artist Xenia Hausner, first broadcast, 11 October 2003.

== Public collections ==
- Essl Museum Klosterneuburg
- Albertina
- Batliner Foundation
- Wien Museum
- European Central Bank
- Museum Angerlehner
- Museum Würth, Künzselsau und Würth Collection Oslo
- Droege Group, Düsseldorf
- The George Economou Collection
- First Art Foundation
- Hong Kong Arts Centre
- Today Art Museum, Peking
- Seven Bridges Foundation
- Shanghai Art Museum
- Seven Bridges Foundation, US
- Steven Bennett Collection, San Antonio, US
- Serendipity Arts Trust, New Delhi, India
- Sammlung Klewan
- Paul Allen Collection

== Literature ==
- Xenia Hausner: Look Left – Look Right. Brandstätter Verlag, 2014, ISBN 978-3-85033-841-7
- ÜberLeben. Brandstätter Verlag, Wien 2012. ISBN 978-3-85033-715-1
- Flagrant délit. Swiridoff Verlag 2012. ISBN 978-3-89929-242-8
- Damage. Hirmer Verlag 2011. ISBN 978-3-7774-4281-5
- You and I. Prestel Verlag, München 2008. ISBN 978-3-7913-4106-4
- Two. Galerie von Braunbehrens, München 2007. ISBN 3-922268-47-1
- GlücksFall. Prestel Verlag, München 2005. ISBN 3-7913-3621-5
- Damenwahl- Berichte aus dem Labor, mit Beiträgen von André Heller, Elfriede Jelinek und Peter Weiermair, deutsch/englisch, Übersetzung von P. J. Blumenthal und Allison Brown, Wienand Verlag, Köln 2003. ISBN 3-87909-824-7
- Wieland Schmied (Hrsg.): Xenia Hausner. Kampfzone. 2. Auflage, Wienand Verlag, Köln 2003. ISBN 3-87909-803-4
- Heart Matters. New York 2003. ISBN 0-9675826-5-2
- Kampfzone. Wienand Verlag, Köln 2000. ISBN 3-87909-687-2
- Figuration. Bozen 1999. ISBN 3-905597-09-8
- Liebesfragmente. Wienand Verlag, Köln 1997. ISBN 3-87909-394-6
- Xenia Hausner: Rätselraum Fremde Frau. Braus Verlag, Heidelberg 1990, ISBN 3-925835-48-2
- Global Art Affairs Foundation: "Personal Structures – Crossing Borders". European Cultural Centre, Venice 2015, ISBN 978-94-90784-18-8
- Die andere Sicht. Sammlerin und Künstlerin. Edition Sammlung Essl, 2014, ISBN 978-3-902001-81-8
- Elfriede Jelinek: Werk und Rezeption. Diskurse. Kontexte. Impulse. Publikationen des Elfriede Jelinek-Forschungszentrums. Pia Janke (Hg.) 2014, 2 Teilbände
- Sie. Selbst. Nackt. Paula Modersohn-Becker und andere Künstlerinnen im Selbstakt. Hatje Cantz Verlag, 2013, ISBN 978-3-7757-3664-0
- Dieter Wellershoff: Was die Bilder erzählen. Ein Rundgang durch mein imaginäres Museum. Kiepenheuer & Witsch Verlag, 2013, ISBN 978-3-462-04555-0
- A.E.I.O.U. Österreichische Aspekte in der Sammlung Würth. Swirdoff Verlag, 2013, ISBN 978-3-89929-272-5
- Museum Angerlehner. Hirmer Verlag, Munich, ISBN 978-3-7774-2130-8
- Holger Brülls: Zeitgenössische Glasmalerei in Deutschland. Centre International du Vitrail, Chartres 2012, ISBN 978-2-908077-06-3
- Burkhard Leismann und Martina Padberg (Hg.): Intimacy! Baden in der Kunst. Kunstmuseum Ahlen, 2010, ISBN 978-3-86832-020-6
- Hans-Peter Wipplinger: Sehnsucht nach dem Abbild. Das Portrait im Wandel der Zeit. Kunsthalle Krems, 2009, ISBN 978-3-901261-43-5
- Christiane Lange/Florian Matzner (Hg.): Zurück zur Figur. Malerei der Gegenwart, Prestel Verlag Munich, 2006
- Österreich: 1900 – 2000. Konfrontation und Kontinuitäten. Edition Sammlung Essl, 2005 ISBN 3-902001-27-5
