= Harmonia Rosales =

American painter (born 1984)

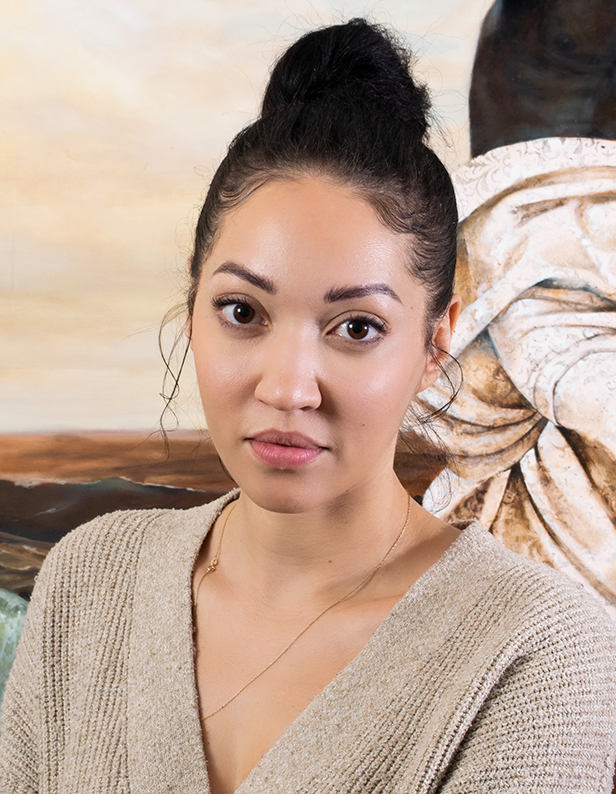
- Rosales in 2021
- Born: February 6, 1984 (age 42); Chicago, Illinois, U.S.
- Education: Glenville State University
- Known for: The Creation of God (2017 painting)
- Style: Painting

Harmonia Rosales (born on February 6, 1984) is an American artist born in Chicago.

== Personal life ==
Rosales was born on February 6, 1984, in Chicago, Illinois, to Cuban-born Giraldo Rosales and Jamaican-Jewish illustrator Melodye Benson Rosales. She was raised in the Santería religious tradition.

As a child she was the model for the original American Girl Addy illustrations, painted by her mother.

Rosales has two children, including a daughter.

In 2018, Rosales and actor Aldis Hodge were reported to be dating and collaborated on a series of paintings.

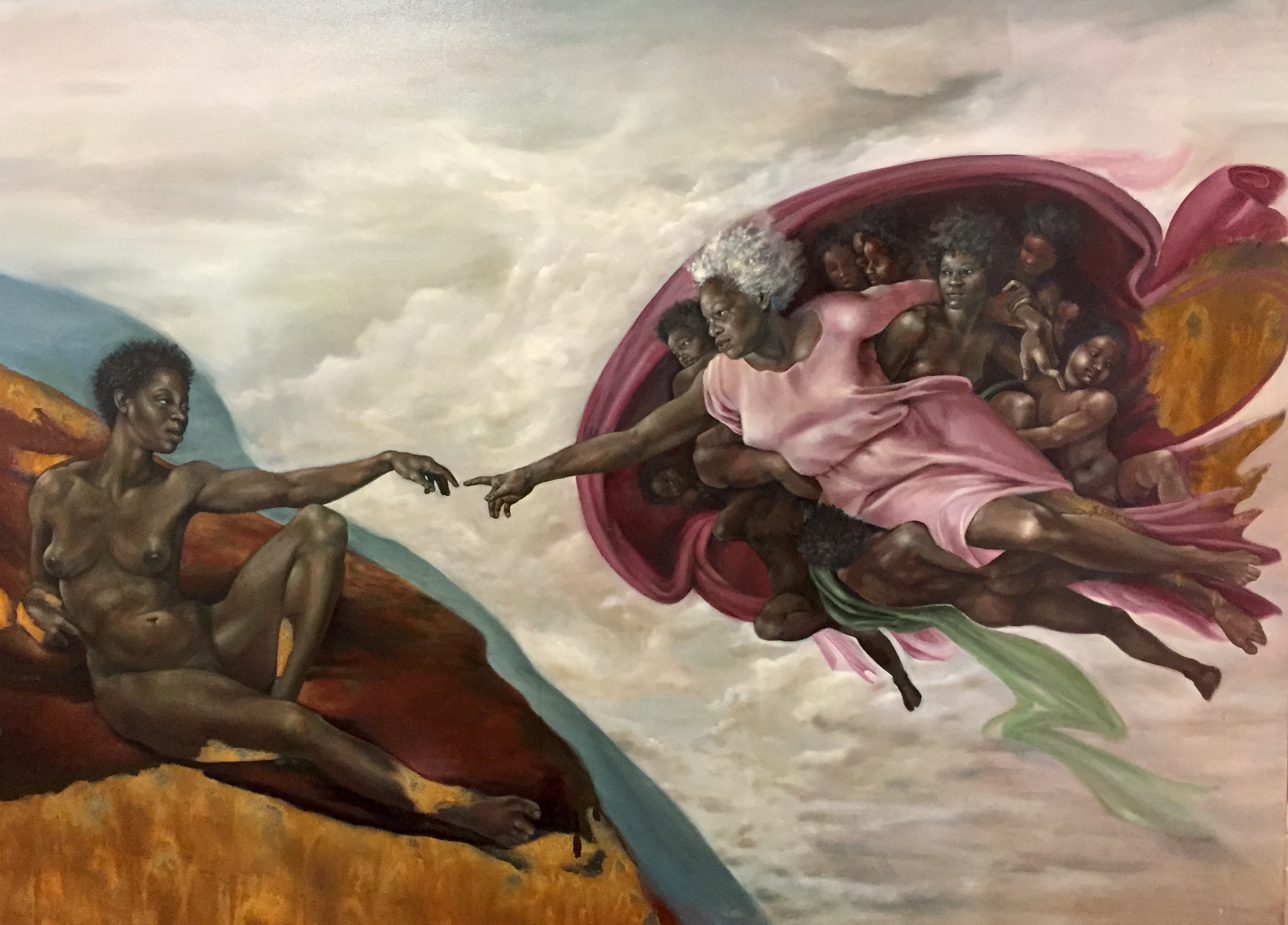
Creation of God, 2017, oil on Belgian Linen

== Career ==
Rosales pursued a degree in Fine Arts from the University of Illinois at Chicago. Her artistic style is characterized by a vibrant color palette and compositions that draw from influences that include Afrocentric motifs and classical European art. Rosales has exhibited her work in various museums, including the Museum of the African Diaspora and the Los Angeles County Museum of Art. Through her work and active dialogues on race, gender, and identity, she has become a voice in discussions surrounding representation in contemporary art. She engages with audiences on critical issues through interviews, panel discussions, and social media fostering awareness.

In 2017, Rosales posted an image, The Creation of God, on social media, of her first completed work for her solo exhibition Black Imaginary To Counter Hegemony. The painting is an oil-on-canvas piece that took two months to craft. In this painting, Rosales recreates Michelangelo's Creazione di Adamo (The Creation of Adam) by displaying both God and Adam as Black women. The Creation of Adam shows Jehovah's finger and the elegant, naked body of the first man. In contrast, the painting created by Rosales shows God as a Black woman and creates the illusion of the heavens as a womb from which she is birthing Eve in an act of strength and empowerment. This image was created to show that white subjects are the standard in classic art while challenging the viewer to consider why that practice is commonly accepted.

Harmonia Rosales was featured in the Scholl Lecture series, organized by the Pérez Art Museum Miami, Florida, in the fall of 2025. Rosales sat in conversation with professional football player and art collection Desmond Howard.

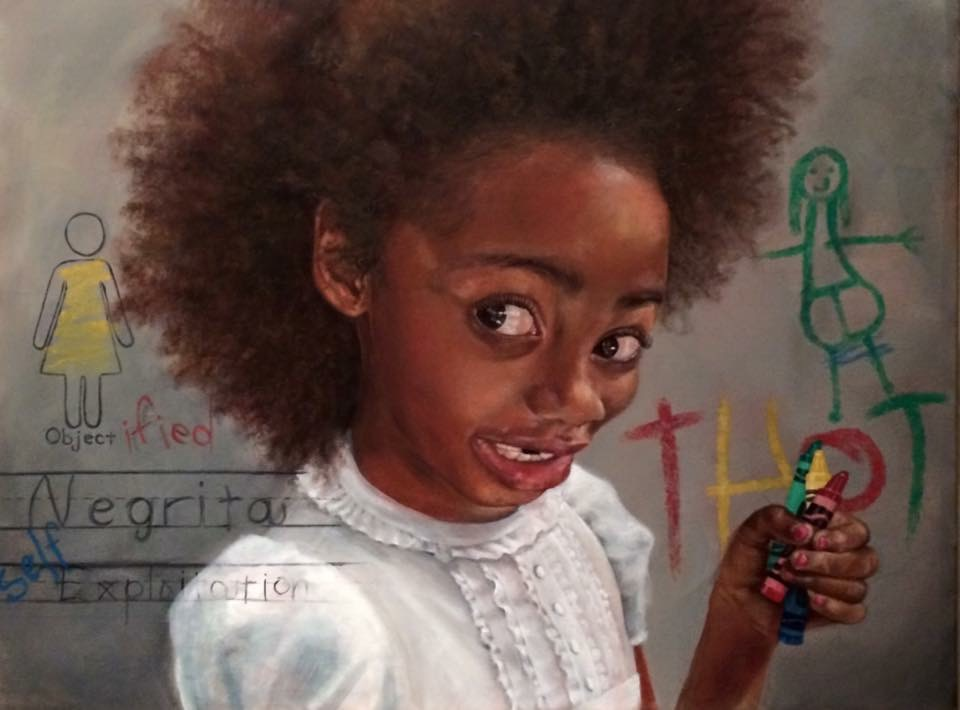
Innocence Lost, 2017 1st-place winner of the Black Creativity award

== Significant works ==
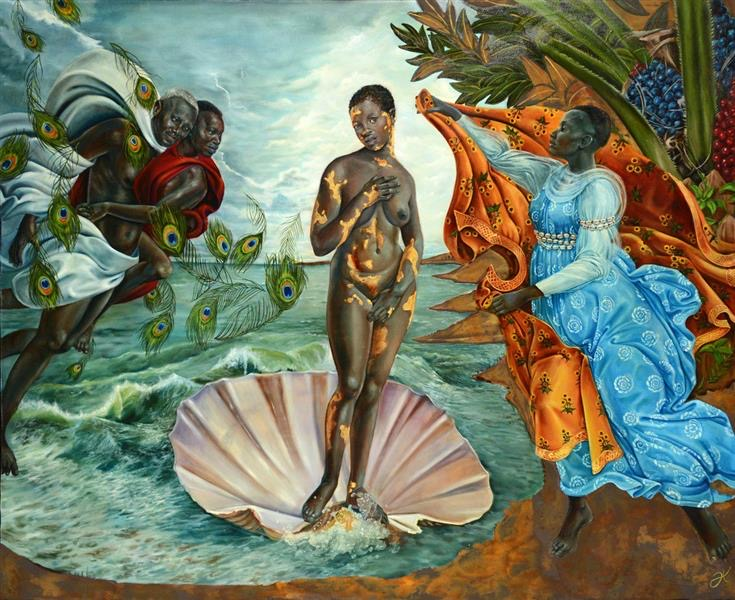
Birth of Oshun, 2017 Oil on Belgian Linen

In 2017, Rosales participated in the Museum of Science and Industry's Black Creativity Juried Art Exhibition. The name of the painting is Innocence Lost and it depicts her daughter and includes all the elements of being overexposed and categorized at a young age. This award encouraged Rosales to move away from portraits and create a strong body of work.

In the same year, Rosales was picked up by Simard-Bilodeau Contemporary, an art gallery based in LA and was given her first solo exhibition. Included in the show was Creation of God. One of her many works included The Birth of Oshun, an oil-on-canvas painting, which reimagines Sandro Botticelli's work, The Birth of Venus, by placing Oshun, the Yoruba goddess of fertility, sensuality, and prosperity, in a sea shell surrounded by black angels, in contrast to Botticelli's painting where a white Venus, the goddess of love, beauty, and fertility, is in a sea shell surrounded by white angels.

In 2025, Harmonia Rosales released her first project as an author, the publication “Chronicles of Ori: An African Epic,” which featured new works and the artist's approach to Yoruba mythology.
