= National Register of Historic Places listings in Muskegon County, Michigan =

The following is a list of Registered Historic Places in Muskegon County, Michigan.
This National Park Service list is complete through NPS recent listings posted May 1, 2026.

	Name on the Register	Image	Date listed	Location	City or town	Description
1	Amazon Hosiery Mill	Amazon Hosiery Mill	April 15, 1982 (#82002857)	530-550 W. Western Ave. 43°14′01″N 86°15′25″W	Muskegon	
2	Central Fire Station	Central Fire Station	March 18, 1999 (#99000341)	75 W. Walton Ave. 43°14′04″N 86°14′44″W	Muskegon	
3	Froebel School	Froebel School	May 11, 2026 (#100012983)	417 Jackson Ave. 43°14′35″N 86°14′01″W	Muskegon	
4	Charles H. Hackley House	Charles H. Hackley House	July 8, 1970 (#70000282)	484 W. Webster Ave. 43°13′53″N 86°15′32″W	Muskegon	
5	Horatio N. Hovey House	Horatio N. Hovey House	September 8, 1983 (#83000887)	318 Houston Ave. 43°13′53″N 86°15′05″W	Muskegon	
6	Hume House	Hume House	January 13, 1972 (#72000646)	472 W. Webster Ave. 43°13′53″N 86°15′32″W	Muskegon	
7	John C. and Augusta (Covell) Lewis House	John C. and Augusta (Covell) Lewis House	December 13, 2010 (#10001027)	324 S. Mears Ave. 43°24′25″N 86°20′52″W	Whitehall	
8	C. W. Marsh Company Building	C. W. Marsh Company Building	November 17, 2025 (#100012321)	1385 Hudson St. 43°13′40″N 86°16′01″W	Muskegon	
9	Muskegon Historic District	Muskegon Historic District	September 27, 1972 (#72000647)	Bounded roughly by Clay, Muskegon, 2nd, and 6th Sts. 43°14′00″N 86°15′15″W	Muskegon	
10	Muskegon South Breakwater Light	Muskegon South Breakwater Light	November 15, 2006 (#06001026)	At south breakwater end in Lake Michigan, 0.4 mi (0.64 km). SW of Muskegon Lake entry channel 43°13′26″N 86°20′48″W	Muskegon	
11	Muskegon South Pierhead Light	Muskegon South Pierhead Light	February 14, 2006 (#06000036)	Southern pier of the Muskegon Lake entrance channel at Lake Michigan, 500 ft (150 m) from shore 43°13′36″N 86°20′29″W	Muskegon	
12	Muskegon YMCA Building	Muskegon YMCA Building	August 11, 1982 (#82002858)	297 W. Clay Ave. 43°14′07″N 86°15′02″W	Muskegon	
13	Navigation Structures at White Lake Harbor	Navigation Structures at White Lake Harbor	May 26, 2000 (#00000535)	Southern end of Lau Rd. 43°22′31″N 86°25′34″W	Whitehall	
14	Spring Creek Site		June 20, 1972 (#72001475)	Address Restricted	Egelston Township	
15	SS CLIPPER	SS CLIPPER	December 8, 1983 (#83003570)	2098 Lakeshore Dr. 43°13′18″N 86°17′45″W	Muskegon	
16	U.S.S. SILVERSIDES	U.S.S. SILVERSIDES	October 18, 1972 (#72000453)	Naval Reserve Center, Fulton and Bluff Sts. 43°13′39″N 86°20′19″W	Muskegon	
17	Union Depot	Union Depot	December 7, 2000 (#00001489)	610 Western Ave. 43°13′59″N 86°15′28″W	Muskegon	

== See also ==
- List of Michigan State Historic Sites in Muskegon County, Michigan
- List of National Historic Landmarks in Michigan
- National Register of Historic Places listings in Michigan
- Listings in neighboring counties: Kent, Newaygo, Oceana, Ottawa
