= Muskegon Museum of Art =

Art museum in Muskegon, Michigan

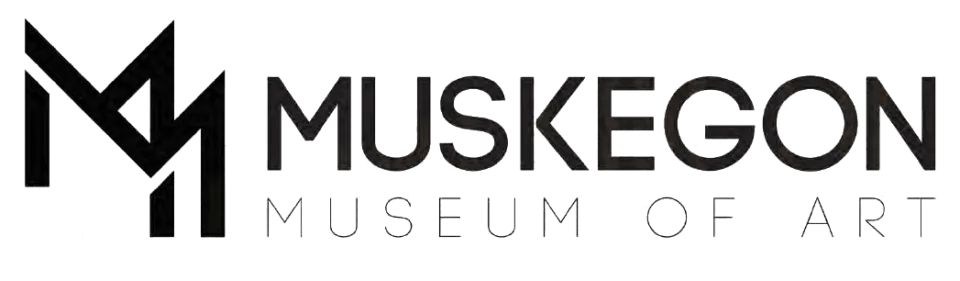

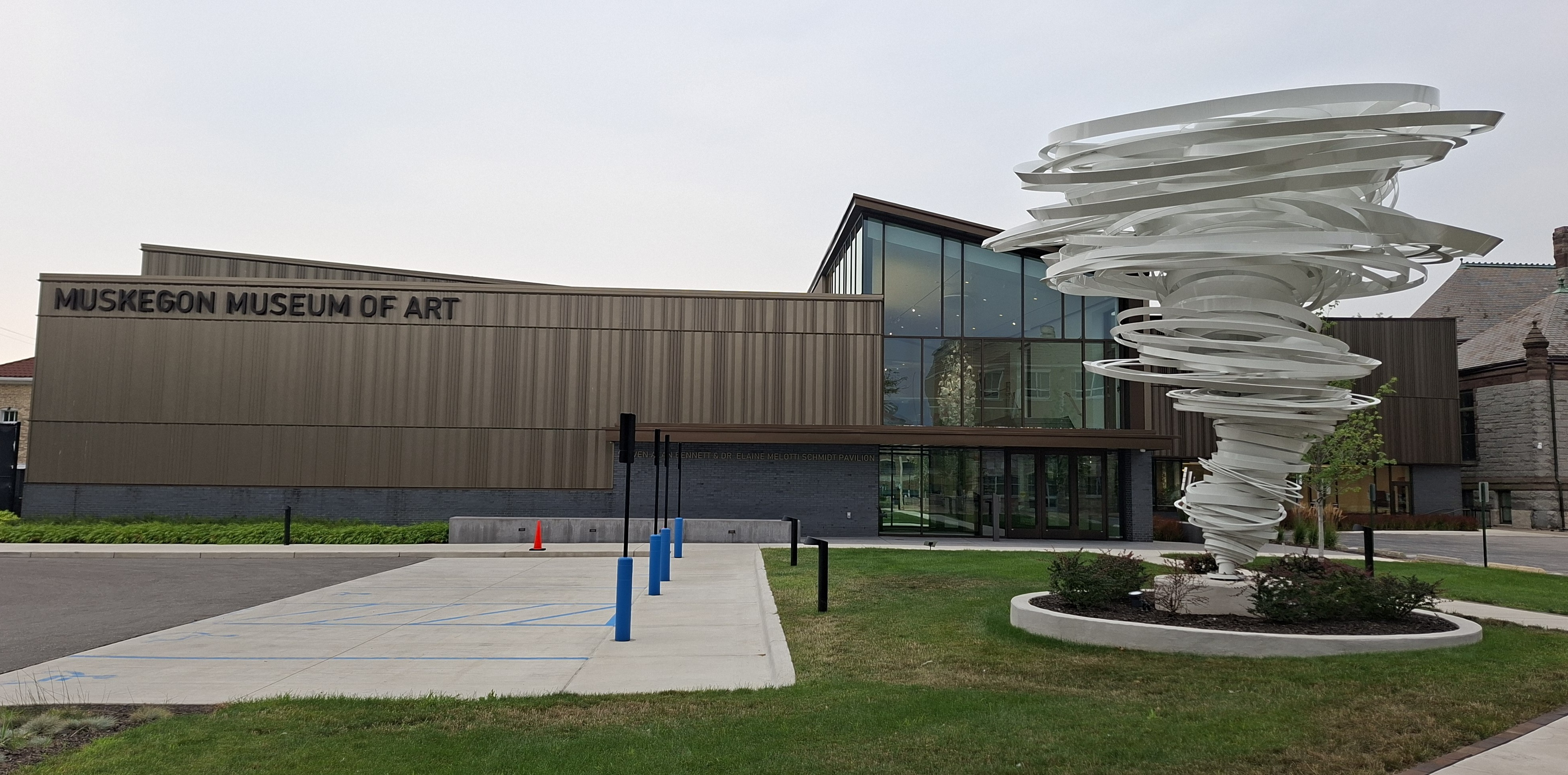
- Main entrance to the museum with Alice Aycock's sculpture Twister Again (2025)
- Interactive fullscreen map
- Former name: Hackley Art Gallery
- Established: 21 June 1912; 114 years ago
- Location: 315 W. Clay Avenue; Muskegon, Michigan; United States
- Type: Art museum
- Collection size: 5,500 works
- Visitors: 23,000 (2024)
- Director: Kirk Hallman
- Curator: Joel Zwart
- Architects: Solon Spencer Beman, Annum Architects
- Website: muskegonartmuseum.org
- Muskegon Museum of Art
- U.S. Historic district – Contributing property
- Part of: Muskegon Historic District (ID72000647)
- Designated CP: September 27, 1972

The Muskegon Museum of Art is an art museum in Muskegon, Michigan. Founded as the Hackley Art Gallery in 1912 through a bequest by lumber magnate Charles Hackley, the museum is located in the Muskegon Historic District. Highlights from its collection of 5,500 works, including paintings like Tornado over Kansas (1929) by John Steuart Curry and New York Restaurant (1922) by Edward Hopper, have been displayed across 18,675 sq. ft. (1,730 m²) of galleries since the museum unveiled an expansion in 2025.

== History ==
The timber industrialist and Muskegon resident Charles Hackley left $150,000 in his will to be used for the acquisition of “pictures of the best kind", known as the Hackley Picture Fund. In 1910, five years after Hackley's death, the Muskegon Public Schools Board of Education decided to construct a museum to house the growing collection, leading to the 1912 opening of the Hackley Art Gallery in a building designed by Chicago architect Solon S. Beman near Hackley Park, downtown Muskegon. The gallery was renamed Muskegon Museum of Art in 1980 following a first expansion.

From 2024 to 2025, the museum undertook a second expansion project at a cost of $15.4 million. The new building nearly doubled the museum's total size from 31,800 to 57,570 sq. ft.

== Collection ==
The museum houses over 5,000 works in its permanent collection including paintings by American artists John Steuart Curry, Edward Hopper, George Inness, James McNeill Whistler, Winslow Homer, Henry Ossawa Tanner, John Sloan, Reginald Marsh, Hughie Lee-Smith, sculpture by Richmond Barthé, Helen Farnsworth Mears, Elizabeth Catlett and Deborah Butterfield, and European paintings by Lucas Cranach the Elder, Camille Pissarro, Pierre Bonnard, and Françoise Gilot.

== Gallery ==
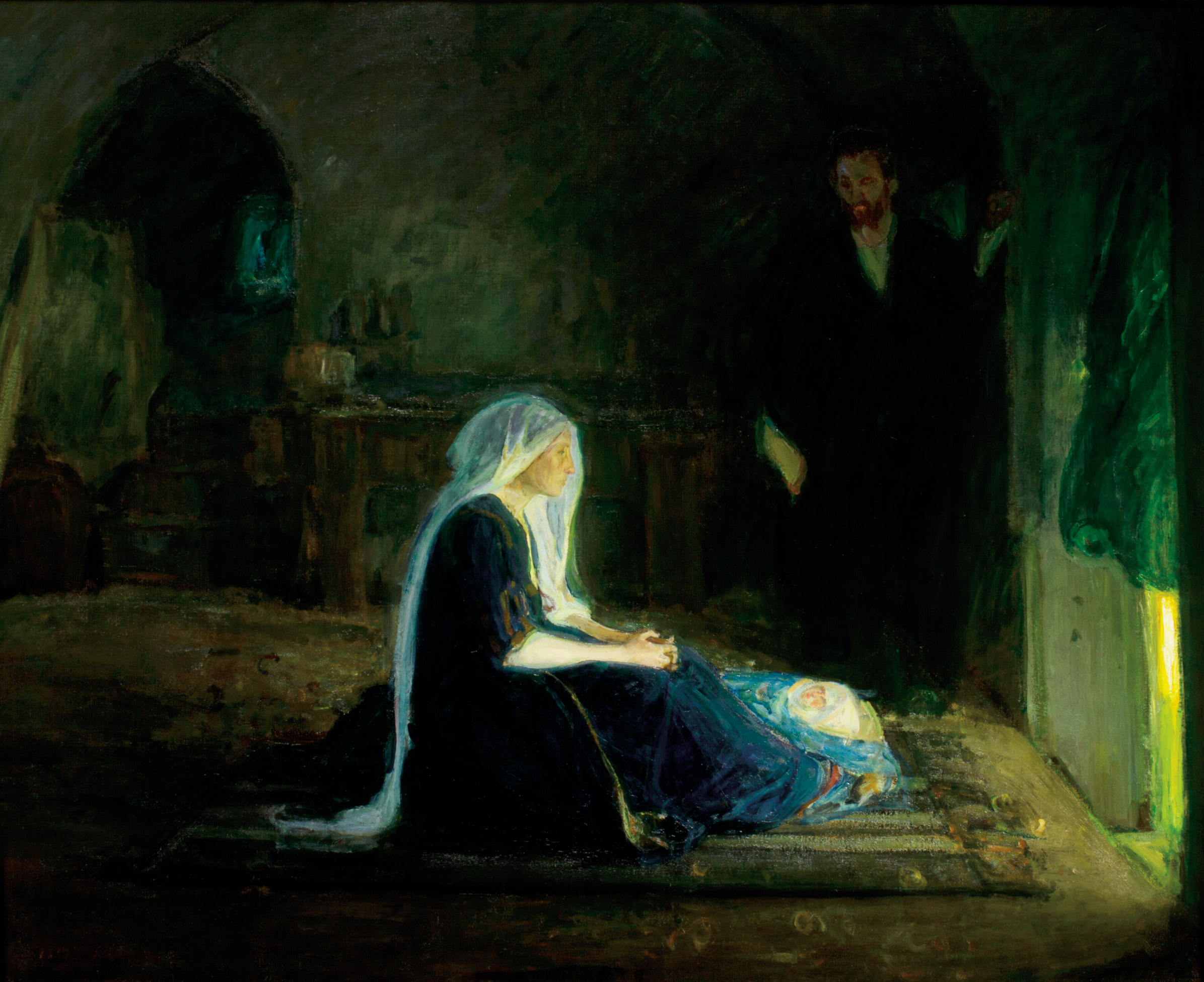
Henry Ossawa Tanner, The Holy Family, c. 1910.

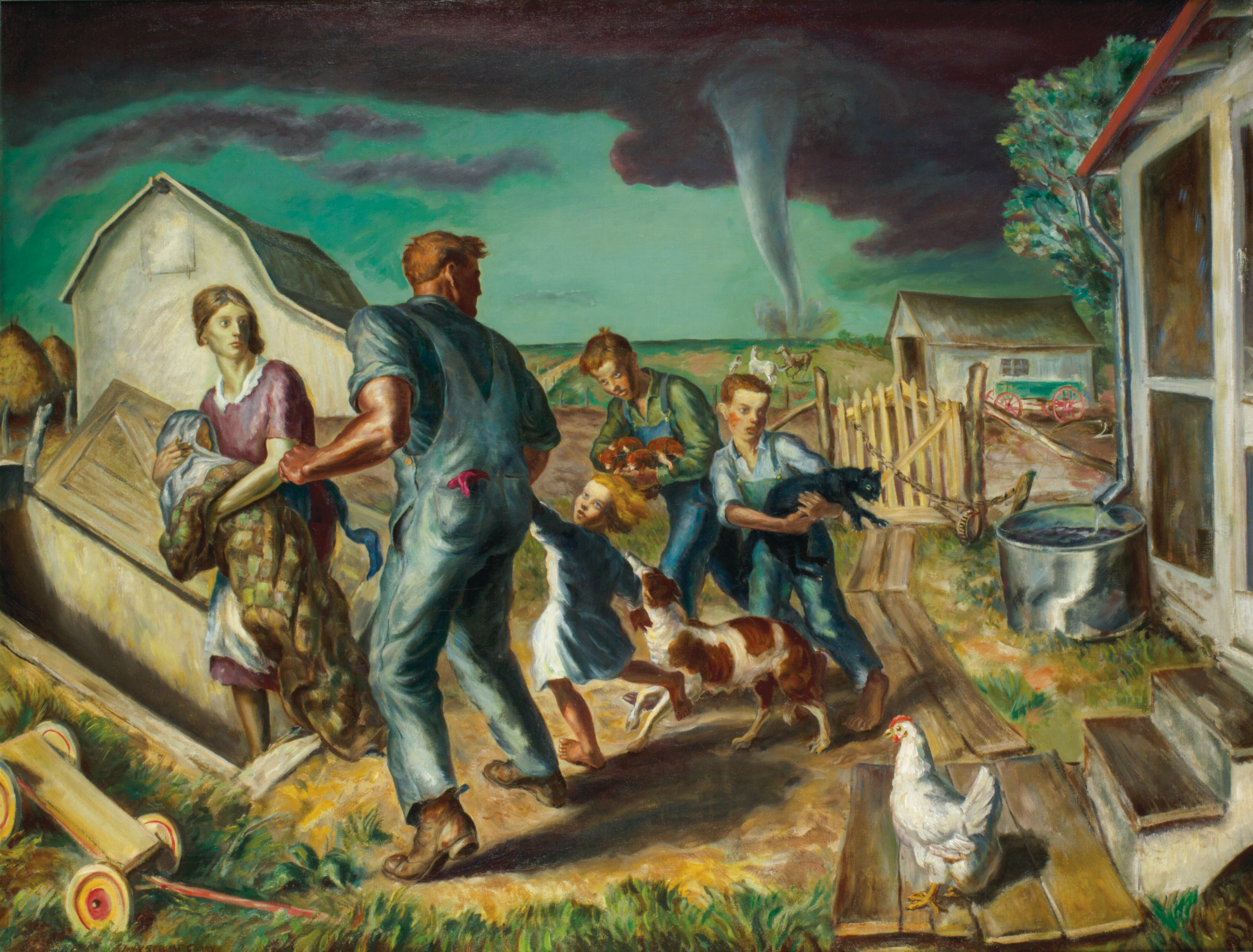
John Steuart Curry, Tornado over Kansas, 1929.

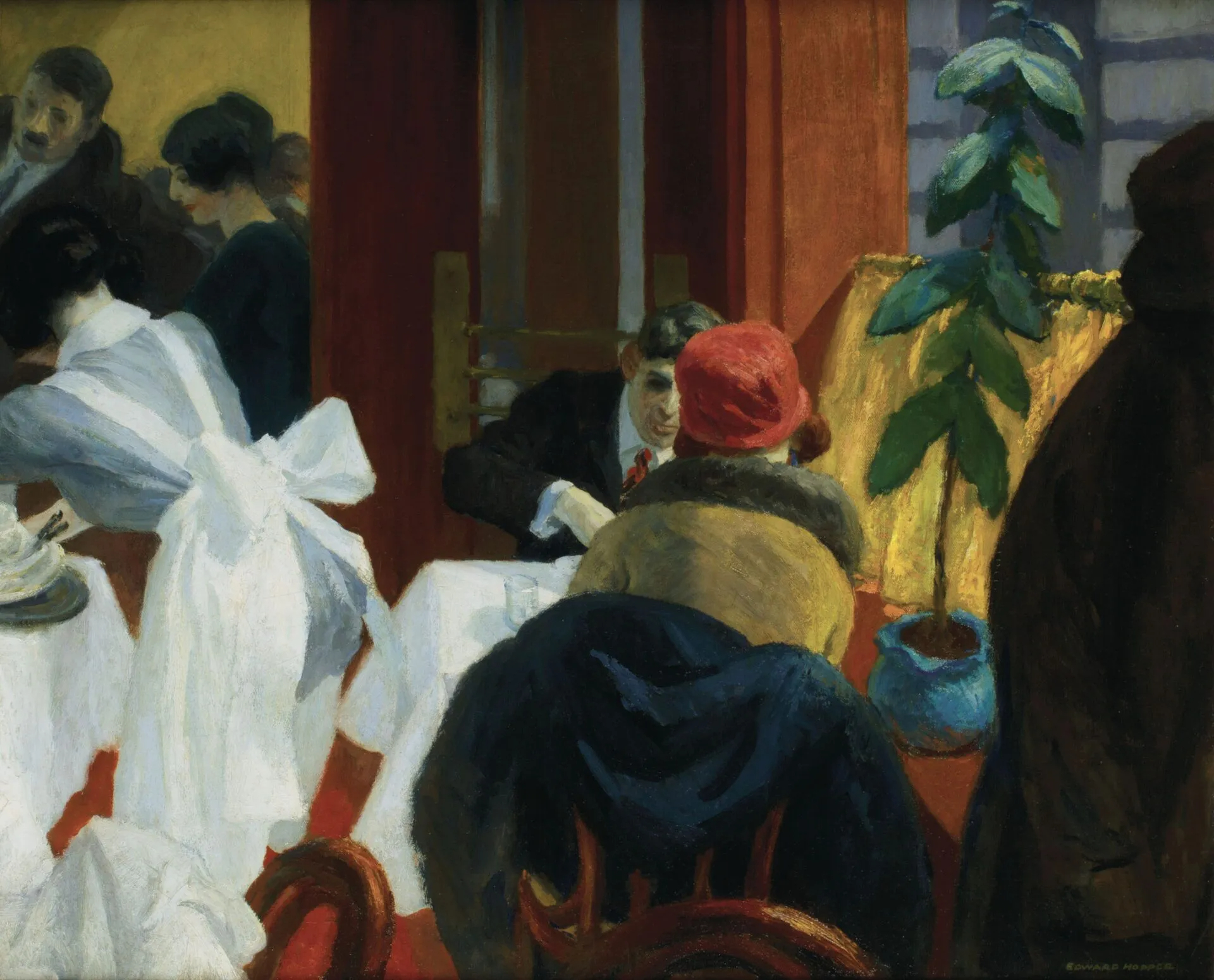
Edward Hopper, New York Restaurant, 1922.

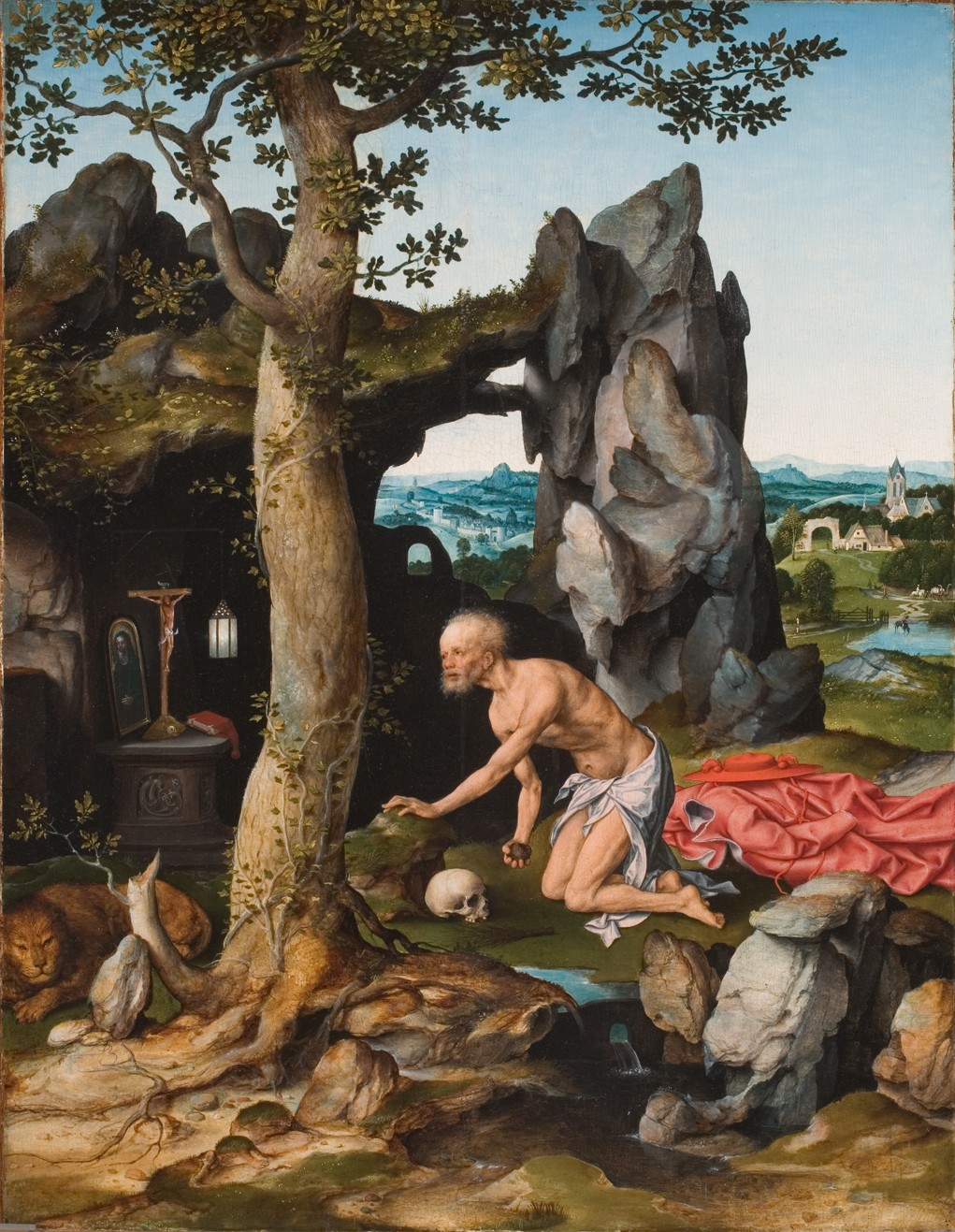
Joos van Cleve, Saint Jerome in Penitence, 1516-18.

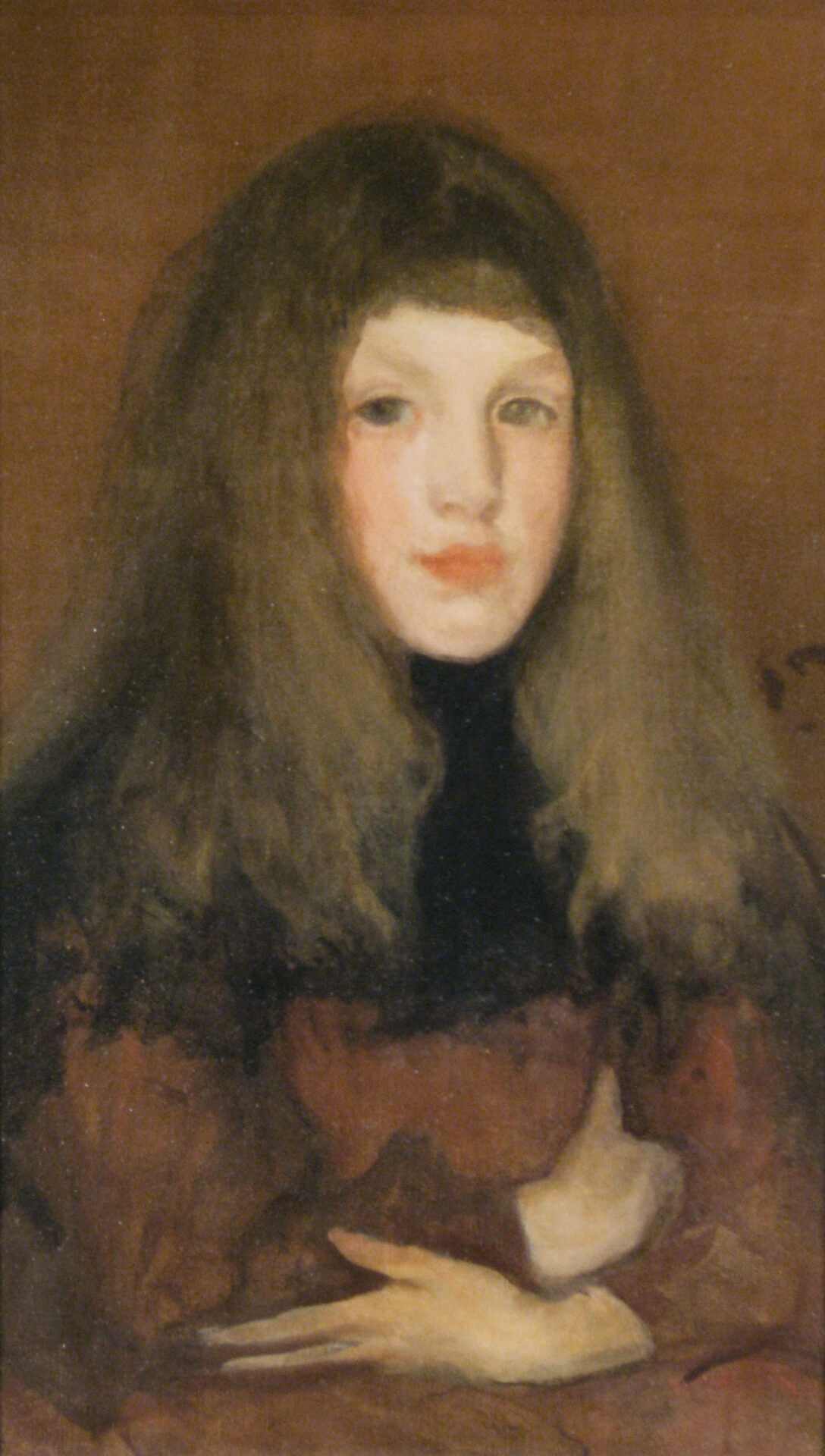
James McNeill Whistler, Study in Rose and Brown, c. 1884.

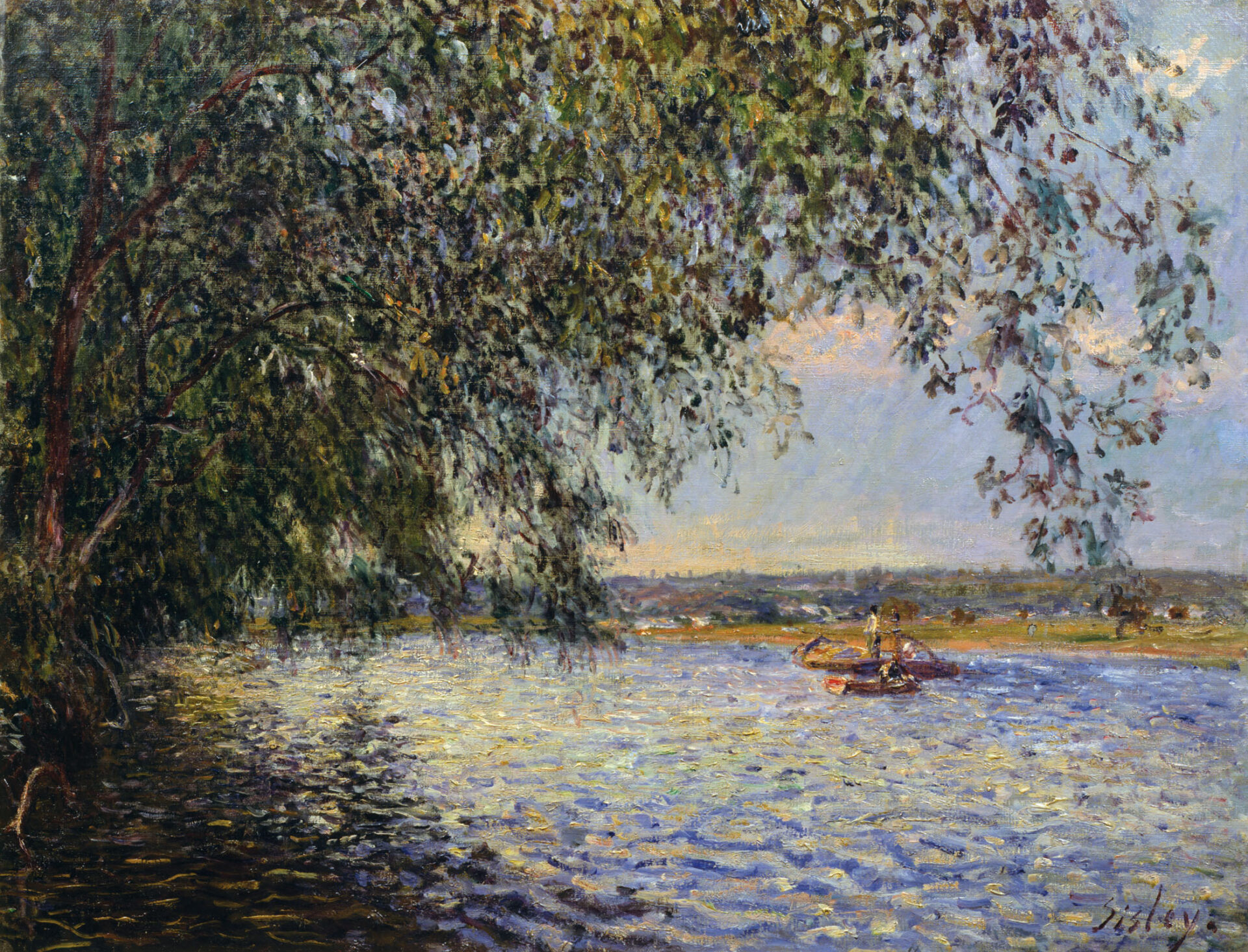
Alfred Sisley, La Seine à Saint Mammès, c. 1880-81.

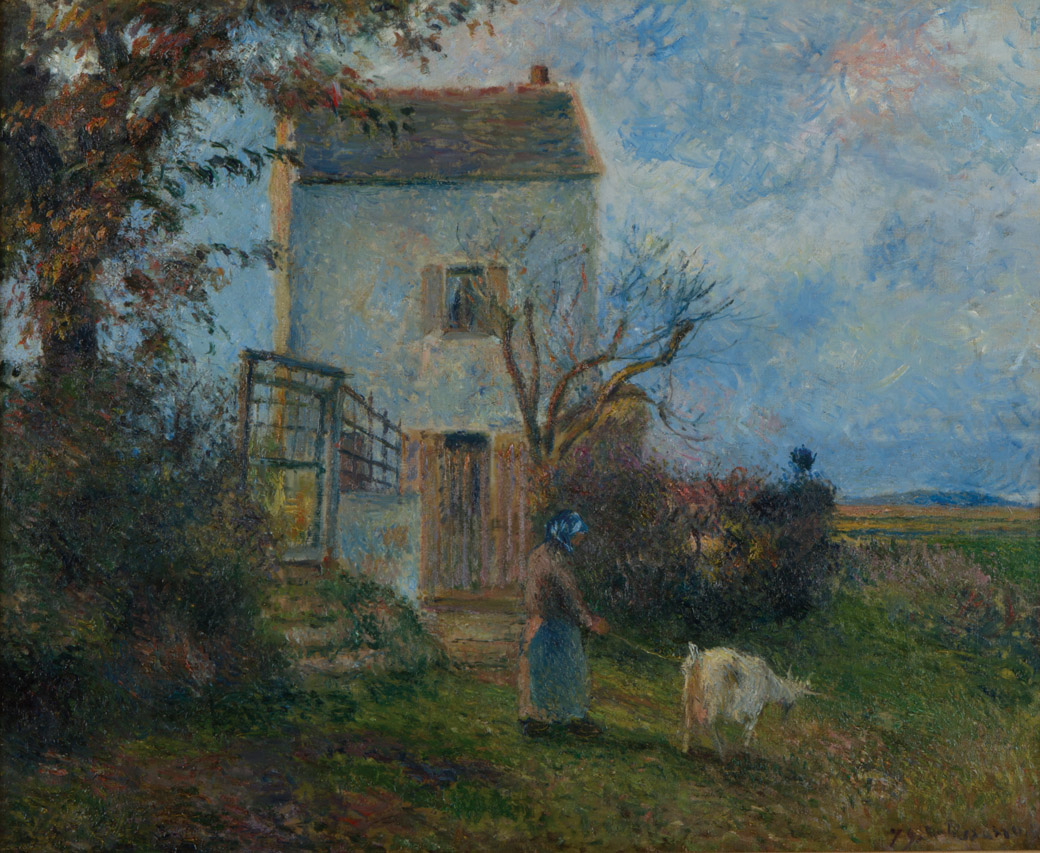
Camille Pissarro, La Ferme (The Farm), 1879.

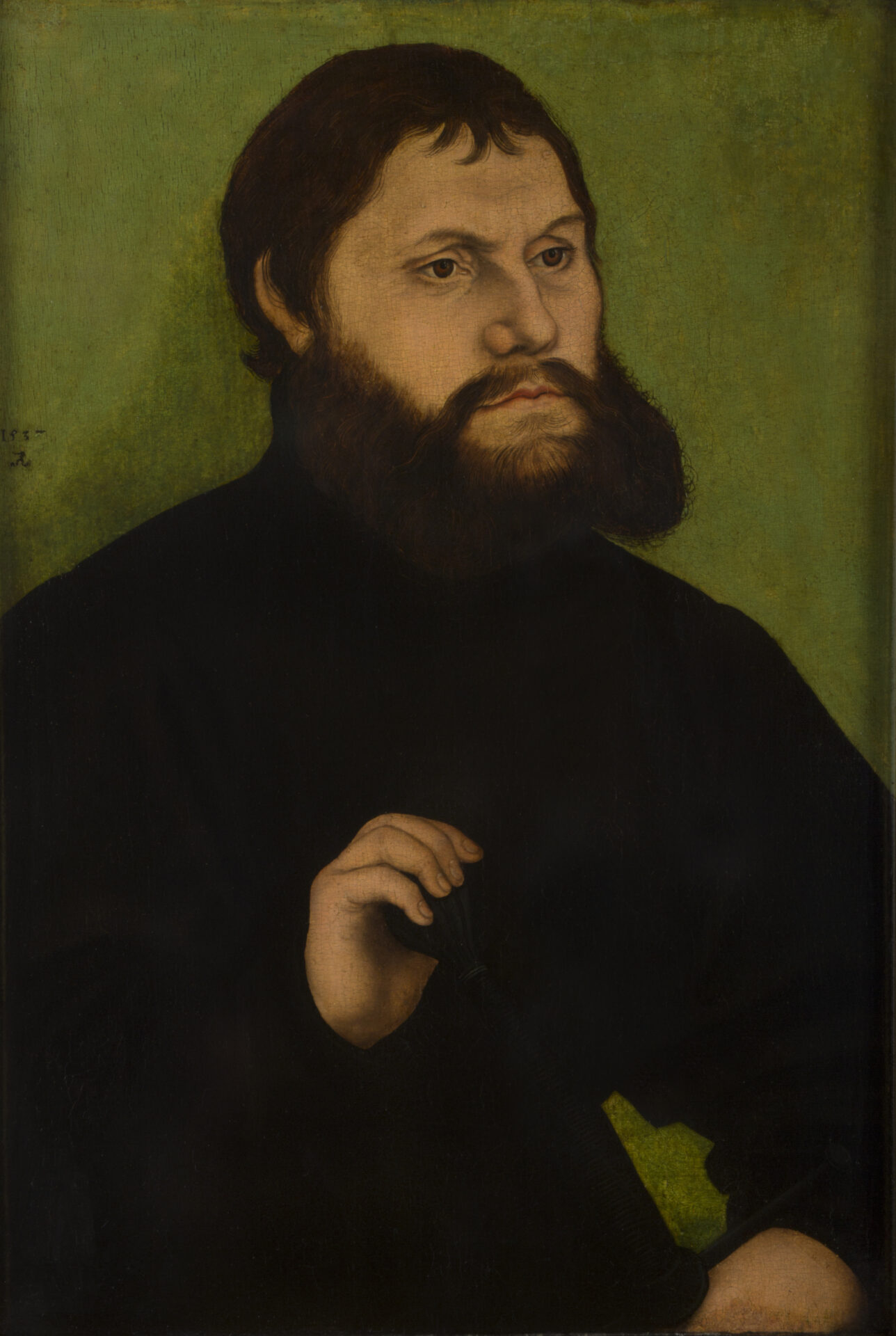
workshop of Lucas Cranach the Elder, Martin Luther as Knight George (Junker Jörg), 1537.

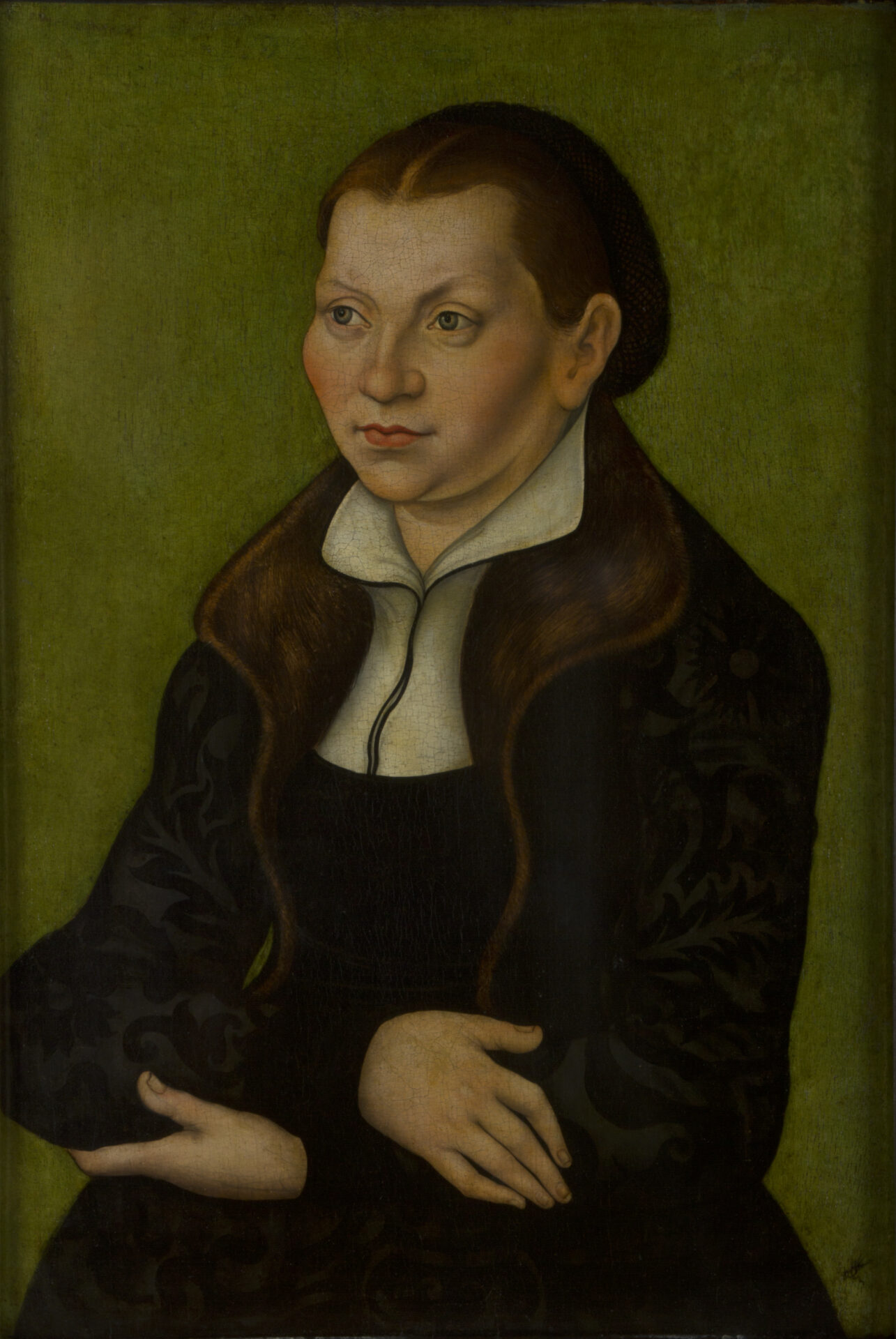
workshop of Lucas Cranach the Elder, Portrait of Katharina von Bora, 1537.
