= Muskegon Historic District =

Historic district in Michigan, United States

- U.S. National Register of Historic Places
- U.S. Historic district
- Michigan State Historic Site
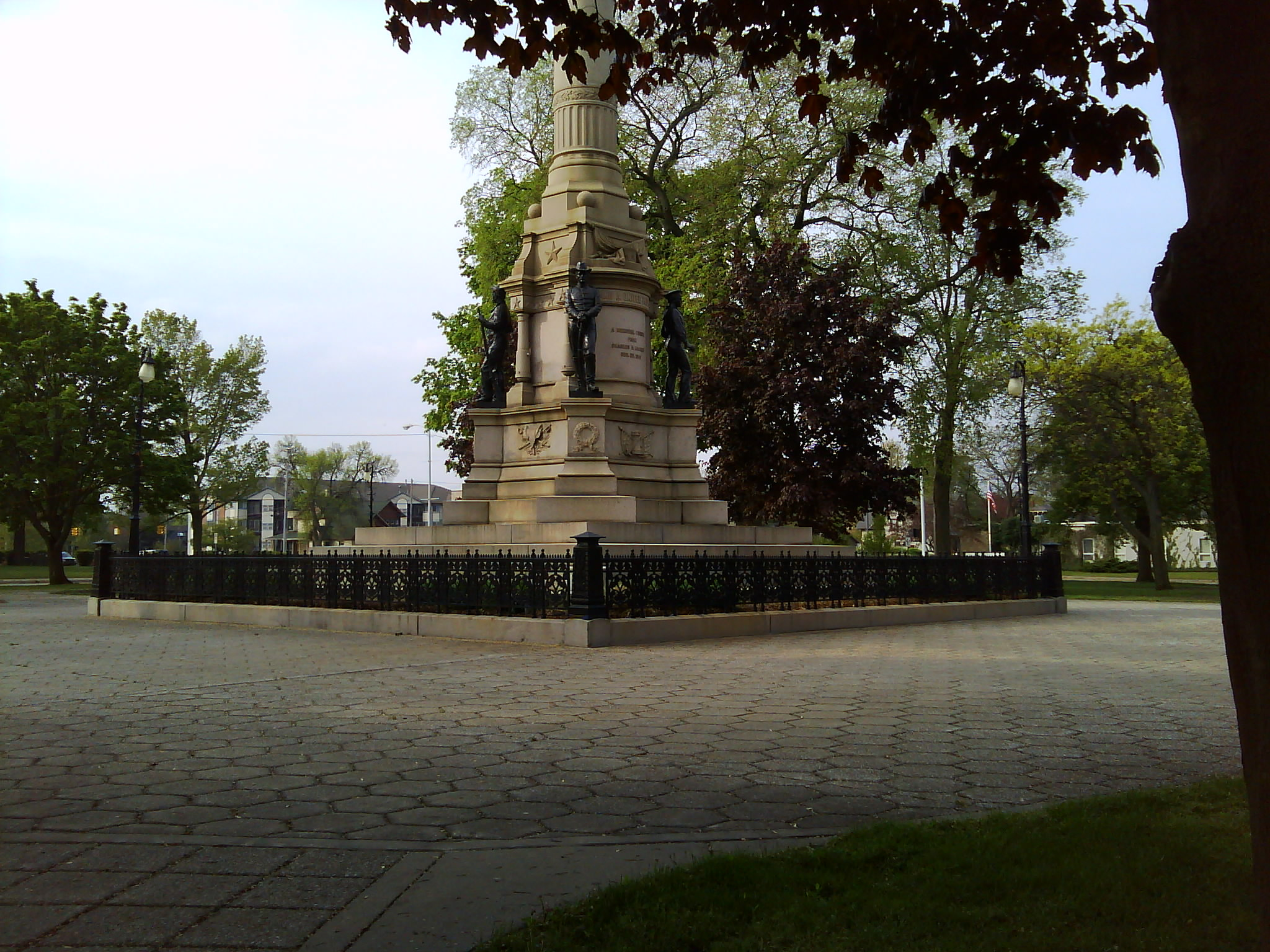
- Soldiers and Sailors Monument, Hackley Park

- Location within Michigan Location within the United States
- Interactive map
- Location: Bounded roughly by Clay, Muskegon, 2nd, and 6th Sts., Muskegon, Michigan
- Coordinates: 43°14′0″N 86°15′15″W
- Area: 20 acres (8.1 ha)
- Architectural style: Italianate
- NRHP reference No.: 72000647
- Added to NRHP: September 27, 1972

The Muskegon Historic District is a public and residential historic district in Muskegon, Michigan, consisting of the four blocks between Clay Avenue, Webster Avenue, Second Street, and Sixth Street, and the two blocks between Webster Avenue, Muskegon Avenue, Second Street and Fourth Street. The district was placed on the National Register of Historic Places in 1972.

== Description ==
The Muskegon Historic District contains around twenty major buildings, along with a small number of outbuildings, such as carriage houses. The district encompasses both public buildings and private residences, as well as Hackley Park. Notable public buildings include the Hackley Library, Muskegon Museum of Art, and the Hackley School Administration Building. Notable residences include the Charles H. Hackley House, the Hume House, and the John Torrent House. Some other houses are included in the district, and are primarily late Italianate in style form the 1880s. These houses are largely architecturally intact, and are still occupied as private residences.

Some significant structures include:

- Hackley Public Library (Third and Webster) Funded by an 1888 donation from Charles Hackley, the Hackley Public Library was designed by the Chicago architectural firm of Patton and Fisher. It is a pink granite Romanesque Revival structure with brownstone trim. The library opened in 1890.
- St Paul's Episcopal Church (Third and Clay) St Paul's Episcopal Church is a greyish greenstone structure, constructed in 1892. Construction was heavily funded by Thomas Hume.
- Muskegon Museum of Art (296 Webster) The Muskegon Museum of Art is a Classical Revival structure designed by S. S. Berman of Chicago. The building and the bulk of the collection was funded by a bequest from Charles Hackley after his death in 1905. The museum opened in 1912.
- John Torrent House (Third and Webster) The John Torrent House is a 30-room granite structure built in 1892.
- Hackley Park (between Clay & Webster, Third & Fourth) Both the land for Hackley Park and the statues located in the park were donated by Charles Hackley to the city. The statues memorialize Union soldiers, sailors, and leaders during the American Civil War. The Soldiers and Sailors Monument stands at the center of the park, and statues of Abraham Lincoln, David Farragut, Ulysses S. Grant, and William T. Sherman stand at the corners.
- Hackley and Hume Houses (Webster and Sixth) These two 1887 Victorian houses and the shared carriage house between them were built for Charles Hackley and his business partner Thomas Hume.

== History ==
In the late 19th century, Muskegon was the center of the lumbering trade in Michigan. Muskegon residents such as Charles H. Hackley made a fortune in the trade. Hackley spent much of his money on projects in his hometown, constructing a public library in 1890, a school in 1893, and a public art gallery in 1912. He also built his own house nearby in 1887, the same time his business partner Thomas Hume built his house. Hackley Park, in the center of this district, is a memorial to Charles Hackley. John Torrent, another lumberman, built his house in the area in 1892.

As of 2017, the Hackley and Hume houses have been professionally restored. and are open to the public as the "Hackley & Hume Historic Sites". The Torrent House is owned by the Red Cross.

== Gallery ==
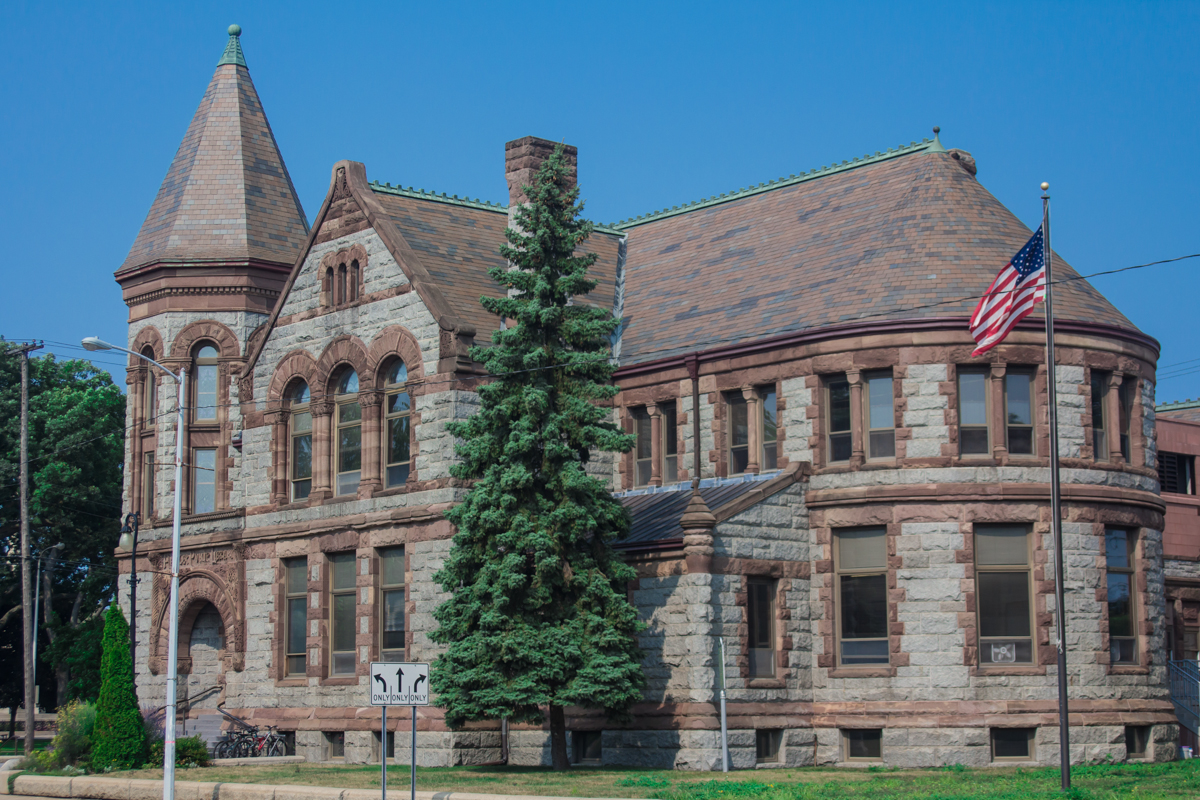
Hackley Public Library

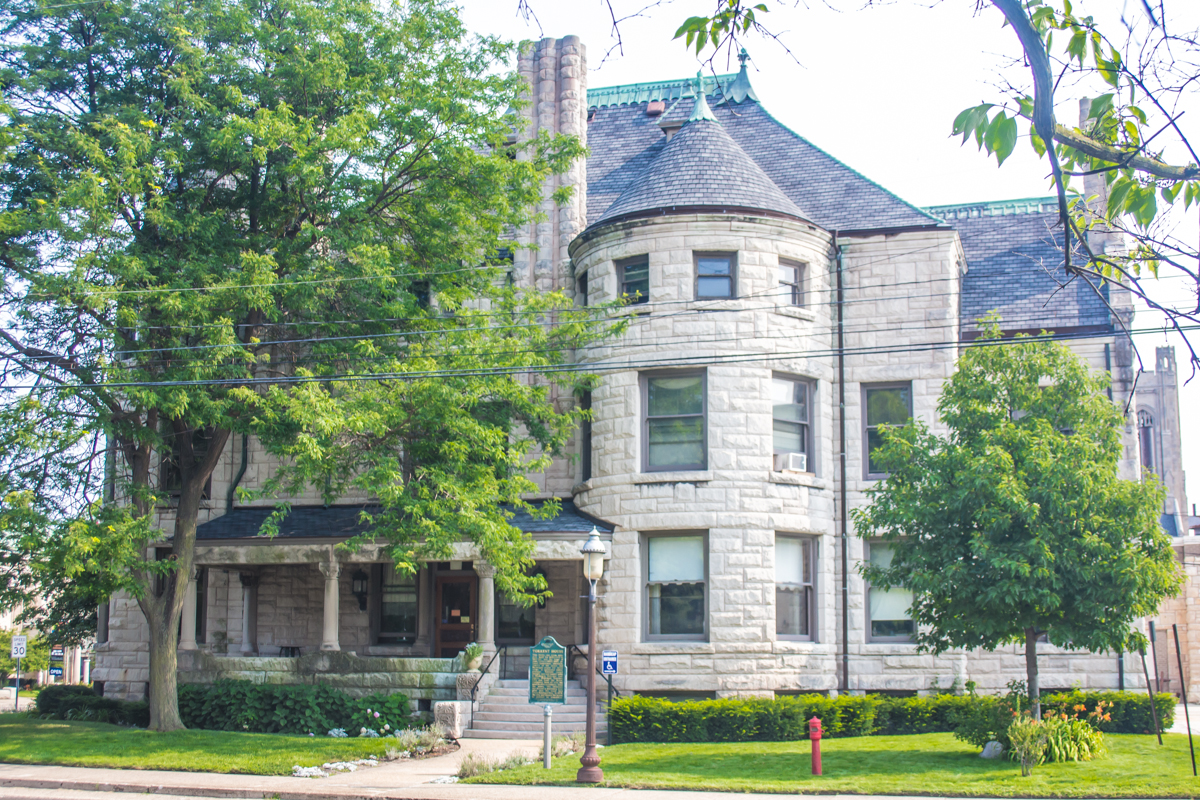
Torrent House

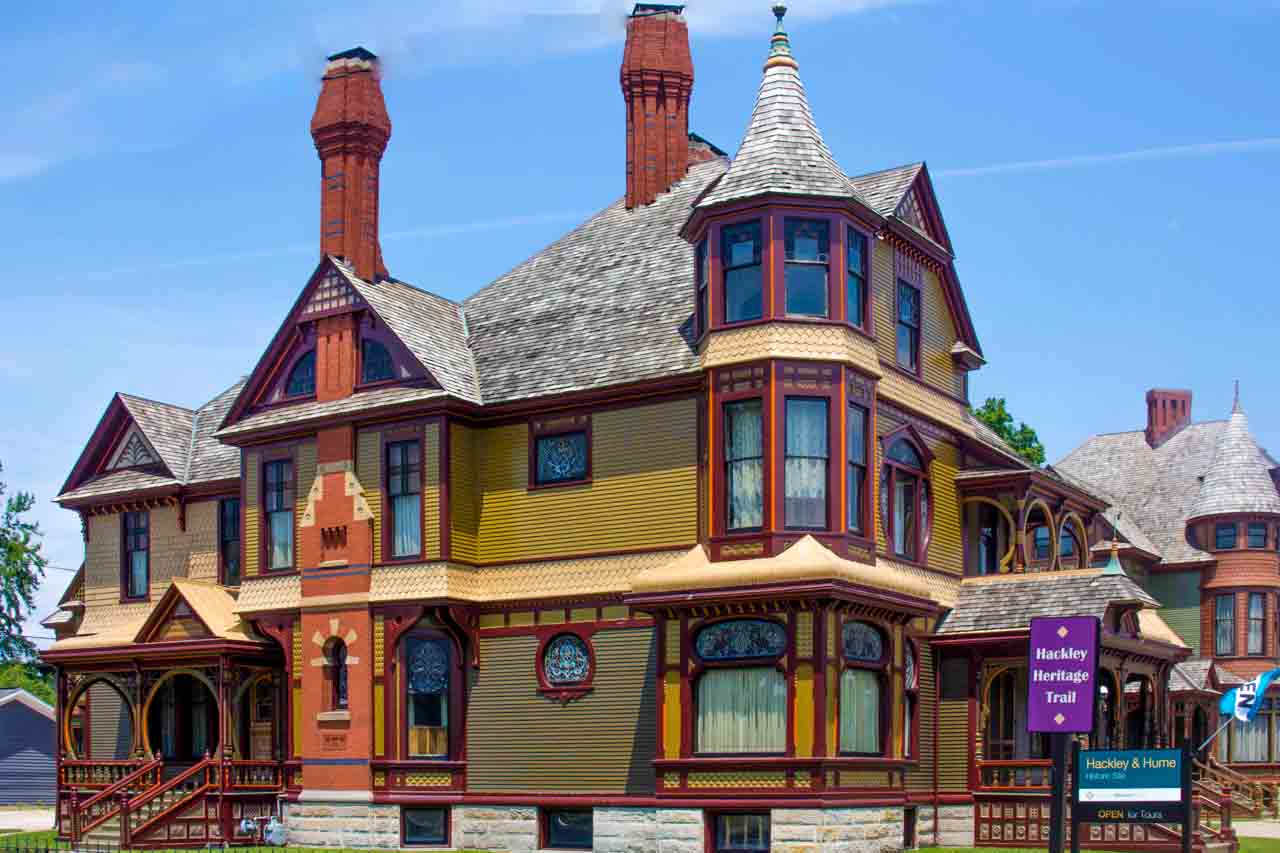
Hackley House

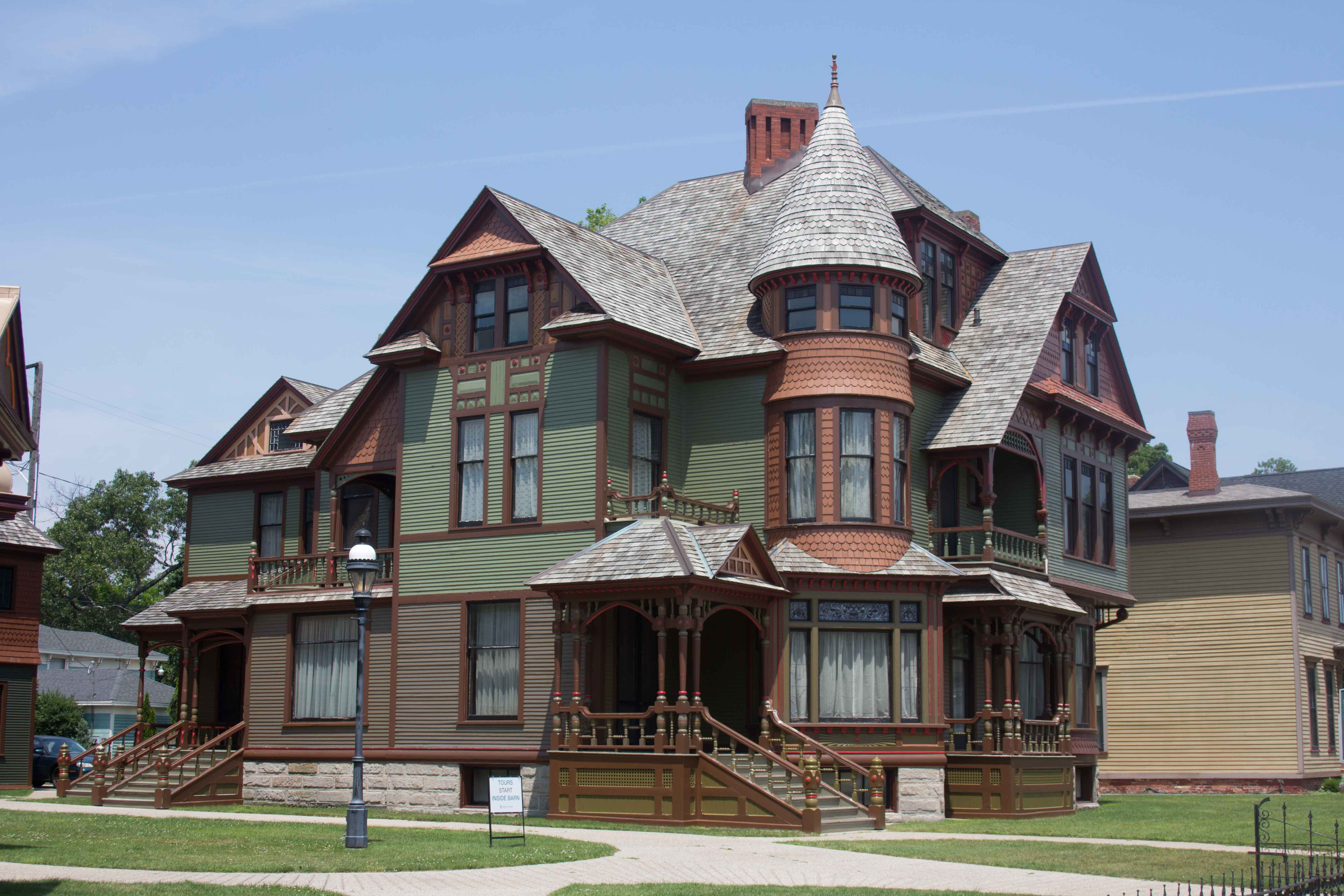
Hume House
