= Charles H. Hackley House =

- U.S. National Register of Historic Places
- U.S. Historic district – Contributing property
- Michigan State Historic Site
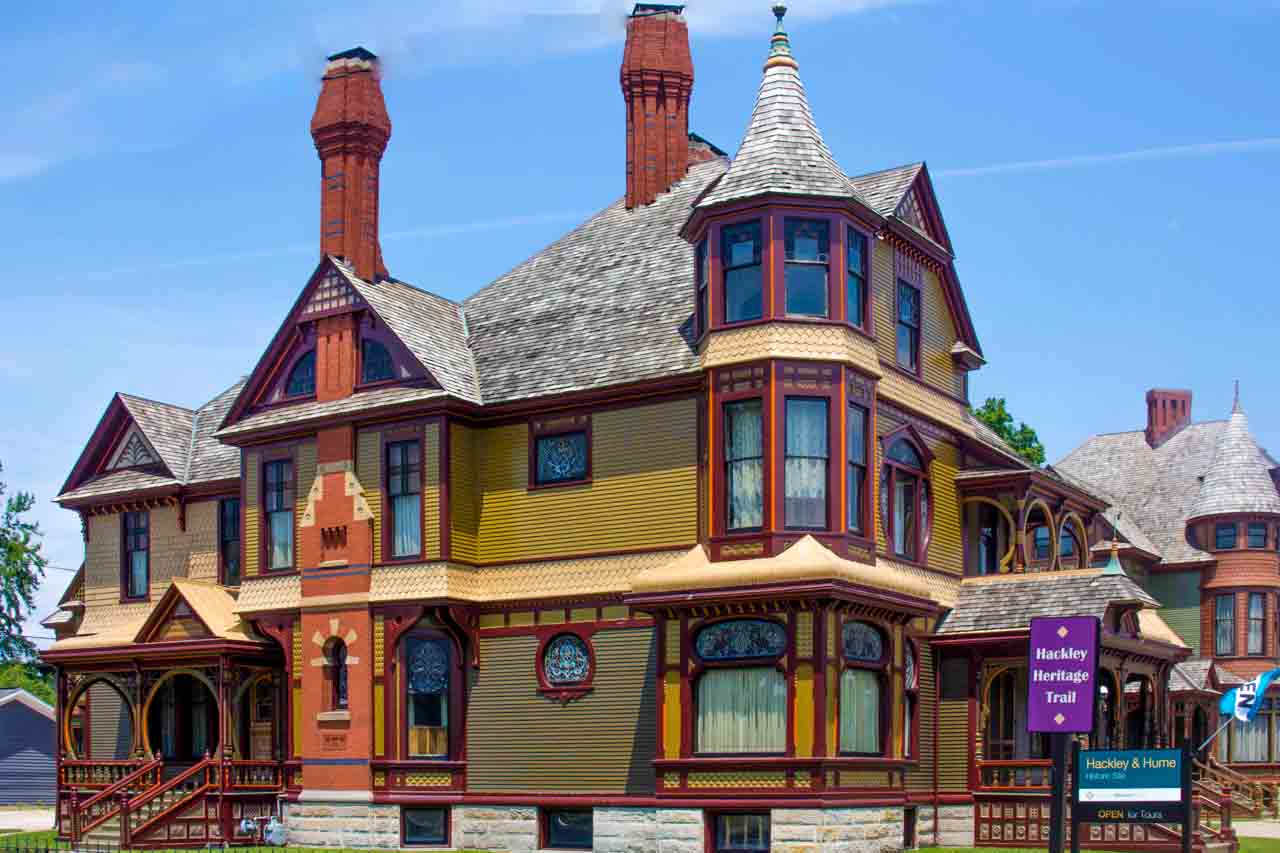

- Location within Michigan Location within the United States
- Interactive map
- Location: 484 W. Webster Ave., Muskegon, Michigan
- Coordinates: 43°13′53″N 86°15′32″W
- Area: Less than one acre
- Built: 1887
- Architect: David S. Hopkins
- Architectural style: Queen Anne
- Part of: Muskegon Historic District (ID72000647)
- NRHP reference No.: 70000282
- Added to NRHP: July 8, 1970

The Charles H. Hackley House is a house located at 484 West Webster Avenue in Muskegon, Michigan, USA. It was listed in the National Register of Historic Places in 1970, and is now part of the Hackley and Hume Historic Sites, and is open to the public.

== History ==
Charles Henry Hackley was born in Indiana in 1837. He moved to Muskegon in 1856, along with his father Joseph, and began work as a laborer in the local lumber mills. He was soon promoted to foreman, and then became a bookkeeper. In 1859 Charles and Joseph Hackley started their own firm, J.H. Hackley & Company. By 1881 Charles Hackley partnered with Thomas Hume to run the very successful lumbering firm of Hackley and Hume. By this time, Hackley had diversified his business interests, and was the leading financial and industrial presence in Muskegon.

In 1887, Hackley began making plans to for his house by purchasing lots on the corner of Webster and Sixth. He immediately sold one and one-half of these lots to his business partner, Thomas Hume, who constructed his own house on these lots. Hackley engaged David S. Hopkins of Grand Rapids to design his house, and the local firm of Kelly Brothers to create the elaborate interior woodwork. The house was completed in 1889.

Hackley died in 1905, and the house remained in the family until 1943, when it was donated to the Red Cross. As of 2017, the Hackley and Hume houses have been professionally restored, and are open to the public as the "Hackley & Hume Historic Sites."

== Description ==
The Hackley House is a large three-story frame Queen Anne house with a three-story tower at the corner and a two-story porch. The elaborate 13-color exterior paint scheme has been reconstructed from the original tones. It has a many-sided roof with prominent gables and a porte-cochere in front. The windows are a mix of shapes, including horseshoe and round; some are made from French plate glass and decorated with stained glass. The house sits on an ashlar foundation. At the rear of the house is a carriage house, which is shared with the next-door Hume House.

On the interior, the house is richly ornamented. The entrance doors and trim in the entrance hall and main rooms include extensive carved, turned, and molded details. These include colonnades, spindles, panels of acanthus leaves, and small figures, all of fine craftsmanship. Ceramic tiles and fabrics are also used to decorate some of the walls. The designs in the decorative elements contain themes covering Byzantine and Cambodian art, Michigan timber, and the brotherhood of man.

== See also ==
- Hackley Park
