= Hume House =

- U.S. National Register of Historic Places
- U.S. Historic district – Contributing property
- Michigan State Historic Site
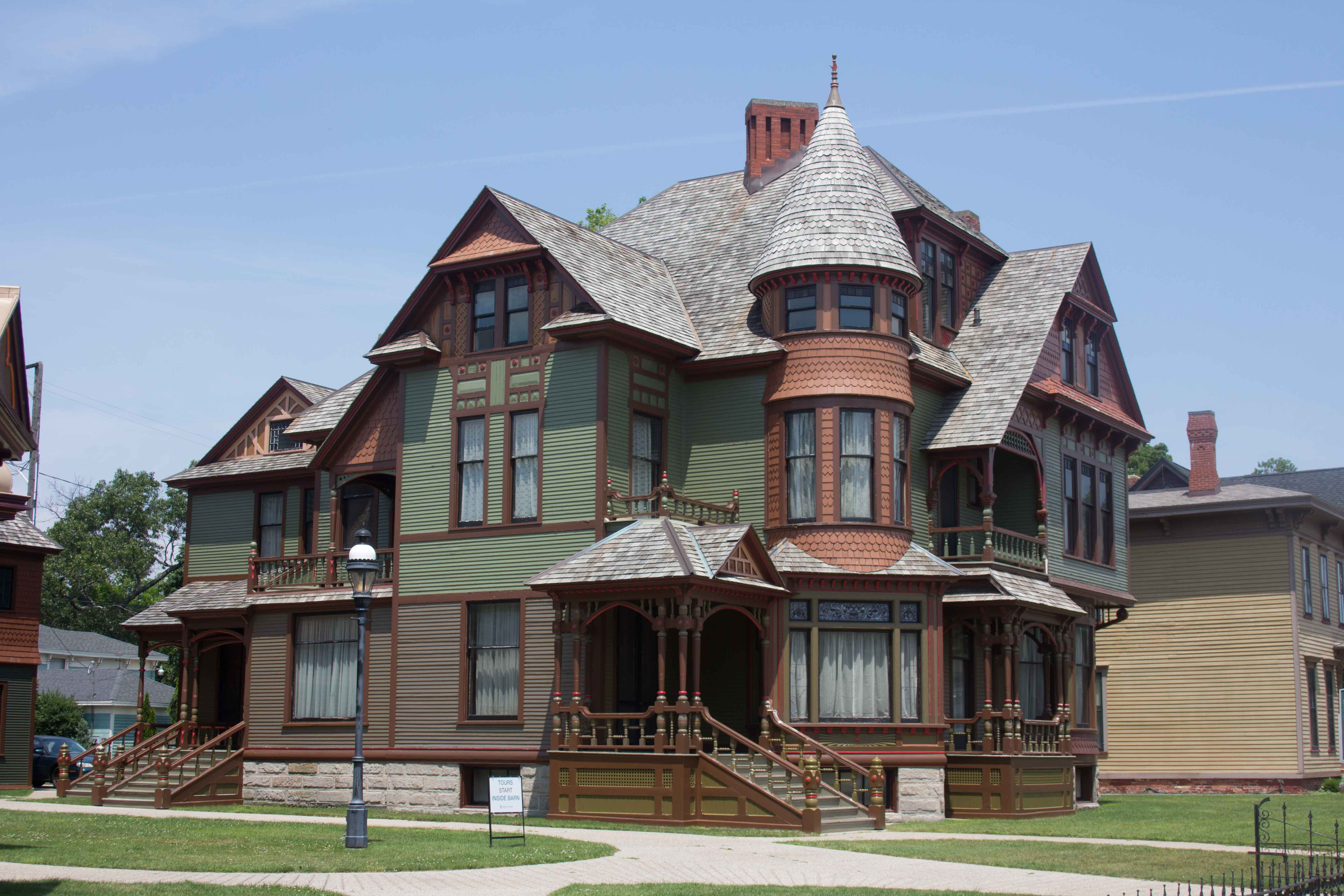

- Location within Michigan Location within the United States
- Interactive map
- Location: 472 W. Webster Ave., Muskegon, Michigan
- Coordinates: 43°13′53″N 86°15′32″W
- Area: less than one acre
- Built: 1887
- Architect: David S. Hopkins
- Architectural style: Queen Anne
- Part of: Muskegon Historic District (ID72000647)
- NRHP reference No.: 72000646
- Added to NRHP: January 13, 1972

The Hume House is a house located at 472 West Webster Avenue in Muskegon, Michigan. It was listed in the National Register of Historic Places in 1972, and is now part of the Hackley and Hume Historic Sites, and is open to the public.

== History ==
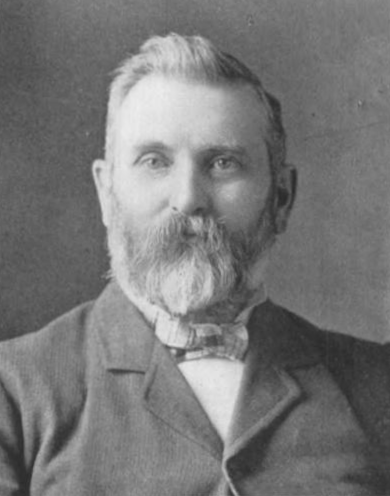
Thomas Hume

Thomas Hume (1848-1920) arrived in Muskegon from Ireland in 1870. In 1872, he joined Charles Hackley's lumber firm as a bookkeeper. In 1881 Charles Hackley and Thomas Hume became partners in the very successful lumbering firm of Hackley and Hume. As the lumber business declined, both Hackley and Hume diversified into other manufacturing and financial interests.

In 1887, Hackley purchased a series of lots on the corner of Webster and Sixth. He immediately sold one and one-half of these lots to Thomas Hume, and then constructed his own house on these lots. Hume engaged architect David S. Hopkins (who also designed Hackley's house) to design his home. It was completed in 1888. The Hume family expanded the house after the turn of the century, adding a library, dining room, and sleeping porch.

Thomas Hume lived in this house until his death in 1920. In the early 1950s, the house was sold to a day care center, and in 1971 ownership was transferred to the Hackley Heritage Association. As of 2017, the Hackley and Hume houses have been professionally restored, and are open to the public as the "Hackley & Hume Historic Sites."

== Description ==
The Hume House is a Queen Anne structure with a gable roof on a cut stone foundation. A porch extends all the way on one side of the house. The elaborate 14-color exterior paint scheme has been reconstructed from the original tones. The main entrance is located at the corner of the structure, and a round turret extends over and just to one side of the entrance. The second floor protrudes slightly over the first floor bay windows. At the rear of the house is a carriage house, which is shared with the next-door Hackley House.

On the interior, a vestibule off the main entrance opens into a central parlor. There are six rooms on the first floor, as well as a bathroom and two halls. There are ten rooms on the second floor, as well as a bathroom and two halls.
