= Hackley Library =

- Muskegon Historic District
- U.S. National Register of Historic Places
- U.S. Historic district – Contributing property
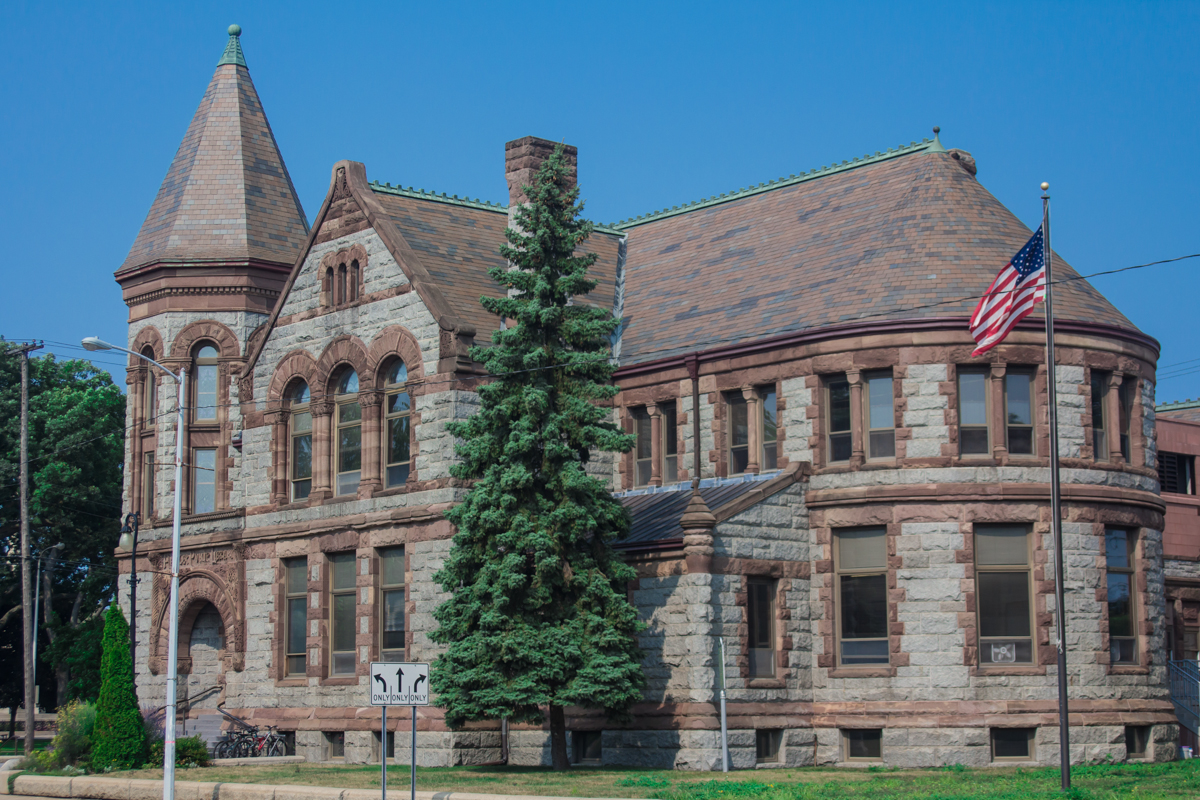
- The library in 2014

- Location within Michigan Location within the United States
- Location: Muskegon, Michigan
- Coordinates: 43°14′3″N 86°15′5″W
- NRHP reference No.: 72000647
- Added to NRHP: September 27, 1972

The Hackley Library is a historic library in Muskegon, Michigan. It was a gift to the school board from lumber baron Charles Hackley to the City of Muskegon Public Schools and opened in 1890. It is listed on the Michigan Register of Historic Places. The library is at 316 West Webster Avenue and owns the historic Torrent House across the street where genealogy records are housed.

Perspective map of Muskegon from 1889 with inset image of the Hackley Library in the upper right hand corner, middle picture

The Library is supported by the Friends of the Hackley Public Library.

The Hackley Administration Building is nearby at 349 Webster Avenue and is also named for Hackley. It is owned by Muskegon Public Schools. It was built in 1889 and efforts are underway to preserve it.

== Torrent House ==
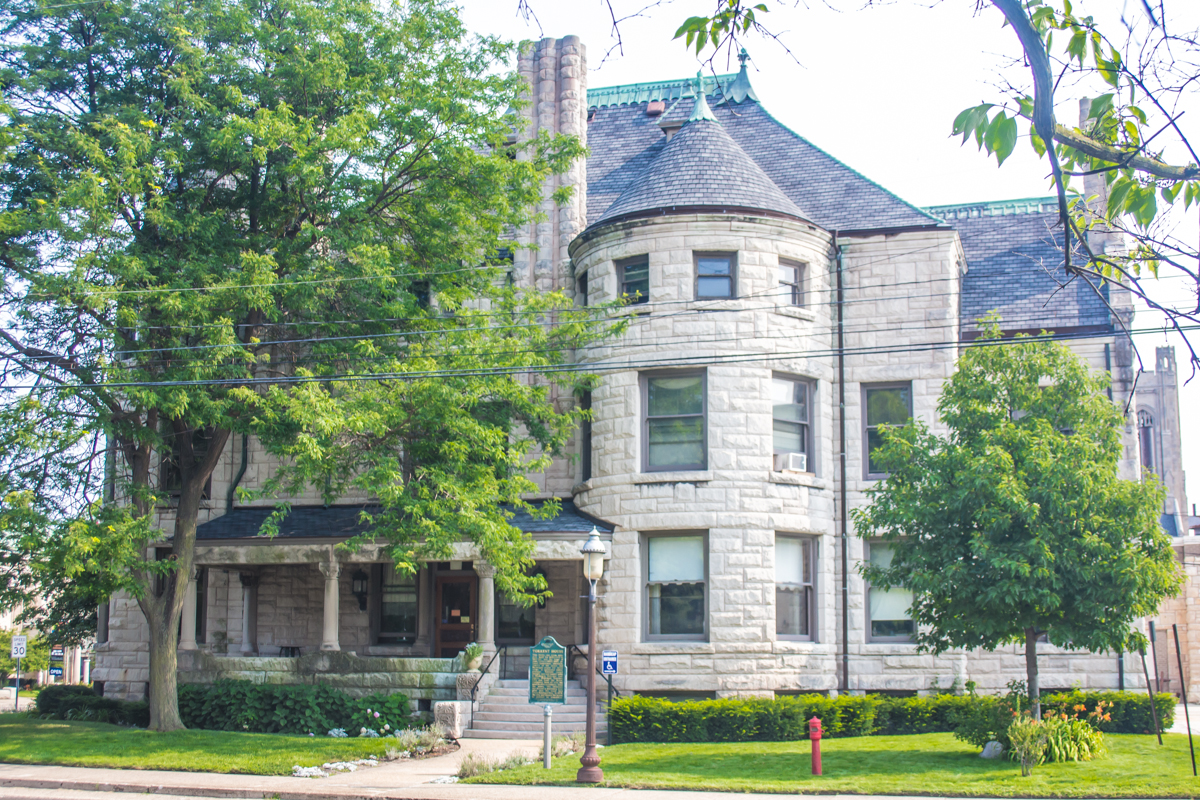
Torrent House

The Torrent House is a 31-room mansion built in 1891-1892 for $250,000 for lumberman, alderman, justice of the peace, and 3-term mayor of Muskegon John Torrent (1833-1915). Torrent owned mills in Muskegon, Manistee, Ludington, Whitehall, Traverse City and Sault Ste. Marie. The residence has also housed a mortuary, hospital and been a local Red Cross headquarters. It was purchased by the city of Muskegon in 1972 to preserve it and avoid demolition. It is located at 315 West Webster Avenue. A Michigan Historical Marker is on site.

The house was built of gray granite atop a limestone base. Inside, various woods were used including mahogany, cherry, birds eye maple, redwood, sycamore, red birch, oak, pine, and rosewood.

== Renovations ==
A $1.2 million interior renovation and restoration project took place in 2014. A major renovation of the library including ramps for access, air conditioning system work, and energy efficiency improvements was undertaken in 2016.

Most of the library's funding comes from a mill tax.

== Architectural features ==
The library features Louis Millet stained glass windows. The library used to get electricity from Hackley's sawmill. When it was not operating gas was used to light the library.
