= Froebel School =

- U.S. National Register of Historic Places
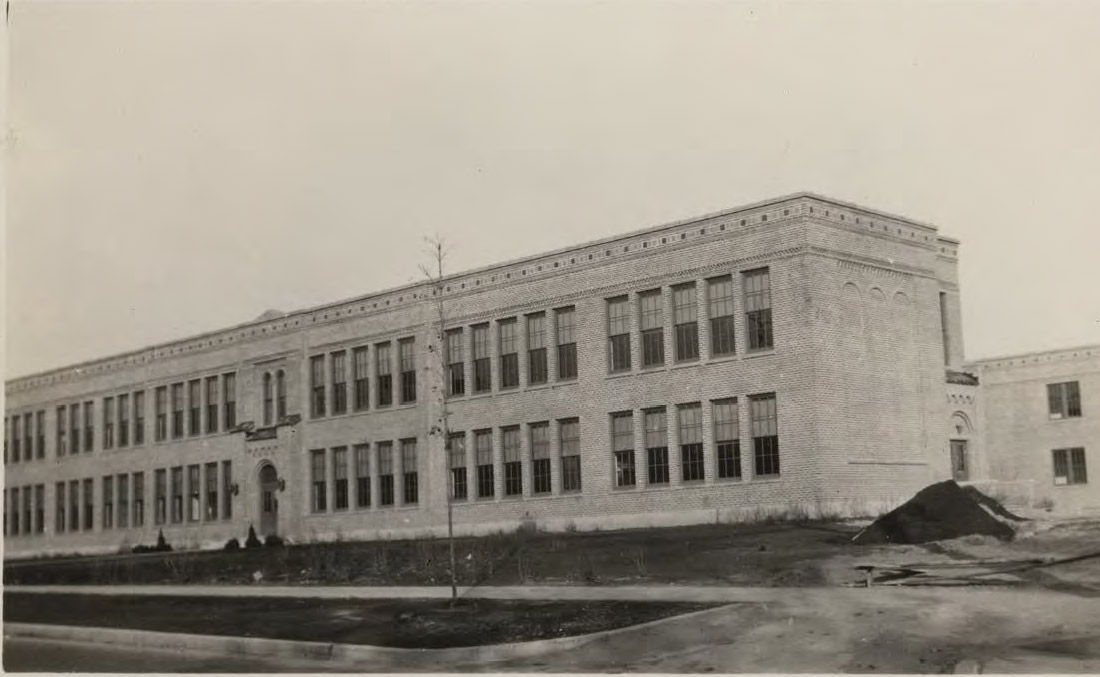
- Froebel School west wing, 1930.
- Interactive map
- Location: 417 Jackson Ave., Muskegon, Michigan
- Coordinates: 43°14′35″N 86°14′01″W
- Built: 1930
- Built by: Strom Construction Company
- Architect: Frank S. Forster, Malcomson and Higginbotham
- Architectural style: Spanish Colonial Revival
- NRHP reference No.: 100012983
- Added to NRHP: May 11, 2026

Froebel School is a former elementary school building located at 417 Jackson Avenue in Muskegon, Michigan. It was listed on the National Register of Historic Places in 2026. The school is being redeveloped into housing, with the project known as Froebel Place.

== History ==
The first Froebel School was constructed in 1887 at the corner of Marquette and Wood Streets. The school was named after Friedrich Fröbel, a German educator whose kindergarten system had been adopted by the Muskegon school district. However, by the 1920s, the school had become overcrowded and reforms in school construction had made the design obsolete. Discussion of a replacement school was started in 1924, and in 1929 the school board proposed issuing a bond to fund a new school. The bond was approved by voters, and the board hired Muskegon architect Frank S. Forster, along with the Detroit firm of Malcomson and Higginbotham, to design a new school.

Construction began on the school some time in late 1929 or early 1930, and was completed by September 1930 for the new school year. The school served as both an educational institution and as a community center, incorporating a public library branch, hosting plays and meetings, and serving as a polling place. In 1970, a new gymnasium was constructed, connected to the school. However, by 1986, the school had fewer than 100 students, and it was closed in 1986. After the elementary school was closed, the building was used for an alternative education program until 2003, after which it was shuttered.

The school remained vacant afterward. In 2014, it was sold to a developer, who defaulted on taxes, causing the city of Muskegon to foreclose on the building. In 2023, the city began considering rehabilitating the school to turn it into housing, and sold the building to the nonprofit organization Samaritas Affordable Living later that year. Samaritas plans to convert the school into 46 affordable housing units, called "Froebel Place." They received a $1.3 million state grant for rehabilitation in 2025.

== Description ==
The original 1931 Froebel School is a two-story greyish brown brick Spanish Colonial Revival building measuring 216 feet (66 m) by 203 feet (62 m). Two primary entrances are on the north elevation of the building. This elevation is symmetrical, with a wide central section containing containing five tall arched windows which open into the auditorium. On each side is a slightly projecting hipped roof tower containing a tall recess with a single window on the first story level. Outside the towers are the main entrances, slightly recessed from the tower and covered with a shed roof above the first floor. The entries each have two sets of twin doors under arched transoms. The second story above is recessed farther and contains three smaller arched windows with a second shed roof above. On the ends of the elevation are pedimented ends of the classroom wings, which contain three recessed blind arches.

The east and west elevations contain banks of identical rectangular windows on the first and second floor. Two secondary entrances are on the first floor, approximately one-third from each end. The 1970 gymnasium is connected on the south (rear) elevation of the building.
