= Amazon Hosiery Mill =

- U.S. National Register of Historic Places
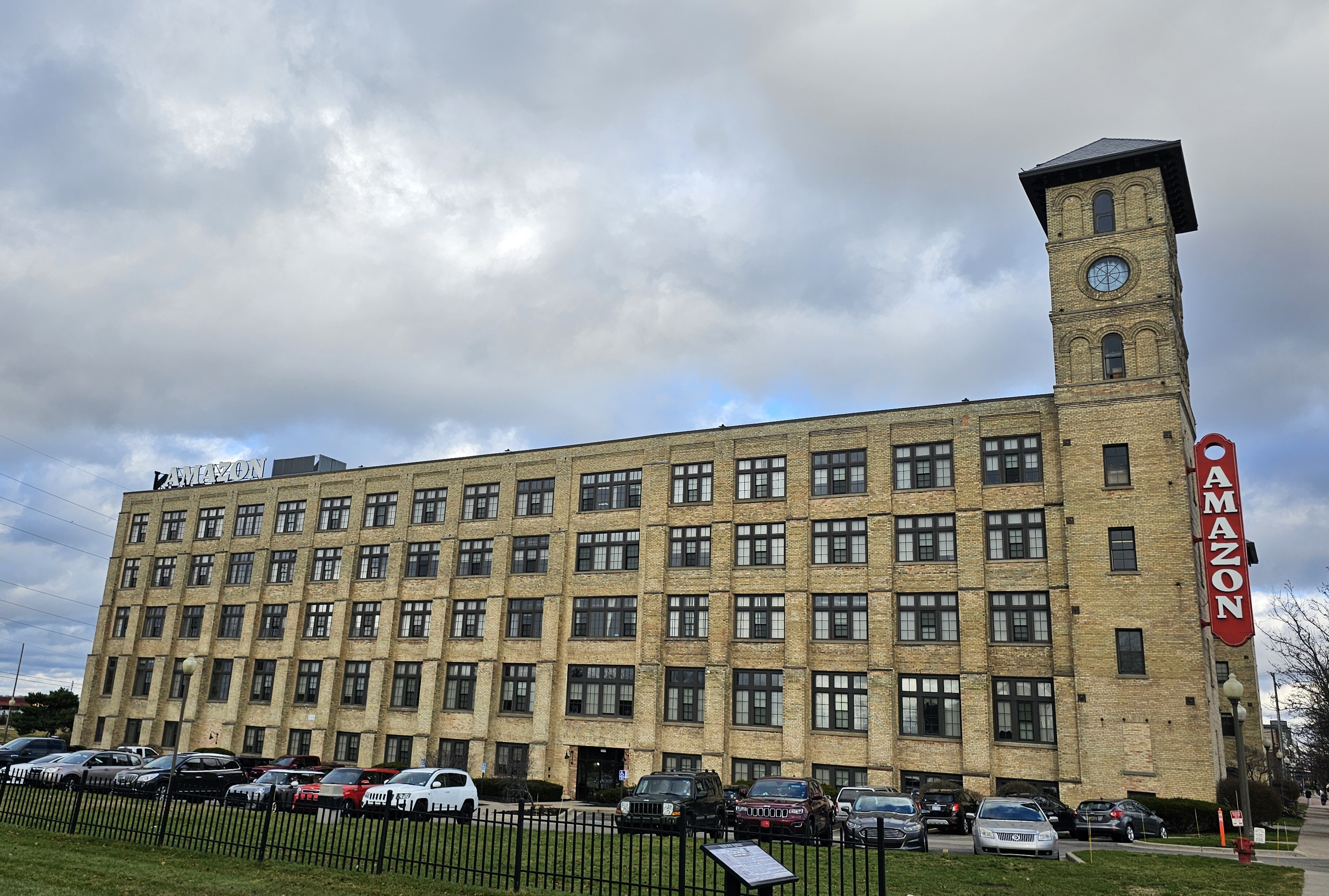
- The apartment building in December 2023

- Location within Michigan Location within the United States
- Interactive map
- Location: 530-550 W. Western Ave., Muskegon, Michigan
- Coordinates: 43°14′1″N 86°15′25″W
- Area: 1 acre (0.40 ha)
- Built: 1895
- NRHP reference No.: 82002857
- Added to NRHP: April 15, 1982

The Amazon Hosiery Mill, also known as the Amazon Knitting Mill, is a former industrial building located at 530-550 West Western Avenue in Muskegon, Michigan. It now houses the Amazon Apartments. The building was listed on the National Register of Historic Places in 1982.

== History ==
The city of Muskegon was built on the lumber trade. However, in the early 1890s, the lumbering business in the area came to an abrupt halt, with lumber shipments from the area plummeting by over 90%. The Muskegon Chamber of Commerce, alarmed at the economic impact on the area, devised an incentive plan to lure new businesses to the city. The plan included financial help to new companies based on employment, and a free building site if employments gains were realized. In 1895, George W. Powell of the Amazon Hosiery Company of Michigan City, Indiana, agreed to move the company's factory to Muskegon. A single-story brick building was constructed on Western Avenue to house the factory.

However, the company struggled at its new location, and in 1897 lumber barons Charles Hackley and Thomas Hume rescued the company, paying $100,000 to gain controlling interest. They reorganized it as the Amazon Knitting Mill and changed their product line. The company began to prosper, and by 1899 employed 650 people. A new four-story brick addition to the factory was constructed that year.

The company continued to flourish during the first part of the twentieth century, and operated well into the Great Depression. However, the onset of World War II siphoned off labor and supplies needed to keep the plant operating, and in 1943 the plant was shut down and the company's assets sold off. The building stood empty until 1945, when one portion was leased to ACDelco, a division of General Motors. Over the next several decades, a number of different businesses moved in and out of the building. In 1993, plans were drawn up to convert the building into mixed residential and commercial spaces. This project was completed in 2001, and as of 2017 the building houses the Amazon Apartments. The building contains 118 apartments and has 98,000 square feet of retail and office space on the ground floor.

== Description ==
The Amazon Hosiery Mill was constructed in two segments. The eastern segment, now apparently demolished, was a single-story, L-shaped building measuring 240 feet in length and 110 feet in width. It had a two-story square tower at the corner.

The larger western section is a four-story U-shaped brick structure with a hipped roof, measuring 240 feet by 200 feet, with sections 70 feet wide. The central block of the U features projecting brick pilasters separating rectangular window openings. Two square towers are placed at the corners of the structure. The eastern tower is five stories tall and is topped by a series of rounded arch windows and a hipped shingle roof. The western tower is six stories high and has two bands of round arched windows located on the fourth and sixth stories. The fifth floor of this tower originally housed a clock, now removed.
