= Spring Creek Site =

Archaeological type site

- U.S. National Register of Historic Places
- Area: 0 acres (0 ha)
- NRHP reference No.: 72001475
- Added to NRHP: June 20, 1972

The Spring Creek Site (20MU3) is a significant archaeological site in the U.S. state of Michigan. Located in Muskegon County in the western portion of the Lower Peninsula, it is the type site for a certain type of Late Woodland period pottery produced by the Ottawa tribe.

The Michigan Archaeology Society excavated the Spring Creek Site in 1955 and 1956. Their results gained significant attention because of the large amounts of pottery recovered from the site. The excavation covered approximately 3,000 square feet (280 m^{2}) of land, finding sherds of 966 different pottery vessels. This contrasts significantly with the number of stone tools at the village: lithic cores, bifaces, scrapers, lithic flakes, and other types of stone tools together only amounted to 344 objects. Such a large ratio of pottery to stone tools has been taken to suggest that the village was the year-round home of many women instead of being a seasonal hunting camp that only men would occupy. The uniformity of pottery at the site has enabled archaeologists to use it as a basis for radiocarbon dating of similar pottery from other sites in the region.

Inhabited during the tenth century AD, Spring Creek appears to have been typical of Woodland period villages in the Great Lakes region: like many others in the region, it was the home of people who both farmed extensively and engaged in hunting. The number of animal bones found at the site is very small — only enough to feed three individuals per year. Other evidence indicates a large population at the site; as a result, it is believed that most meat eaten at Spring Creek was processed at another location. Typical Ottawa villages were inhabited only by women and by old men during most of the year: the men of the village would generally gather into hunting parties that would make extended journeys from home, often departing both during summer and winter; only those individuals who could not participate in the hunts would remain in the village year-round.

Spring Creek is recognized as one of the best examples of an Ottawa semipermanent village. It contrasts greatly with sites such as northern Michigan's Juntunen site: excavations at Juntunen produced vastly different types of pottery, while Spring Creek's artifacts are highly uniform in their style. The two sites were likewise far from similar in their uses: Juntunen is believed to have been a hunting camp that was occupied seasonally for centuries, rather than being intensively inhabited for a small number of years. These two sites, along with similar camps and villages along Lake Michigan, are the basis for a theoretical understanding of the Ottawa economy during the early portion of the Late Woodland period.

In 1972, the Spring Creek Site was listed on the National Register of Historic Places because of its important place in the region's archaeology. A similar distinction was given to the Juntunen site six years later.
