= Charles Hackley =

American timber businessman and philanthropist

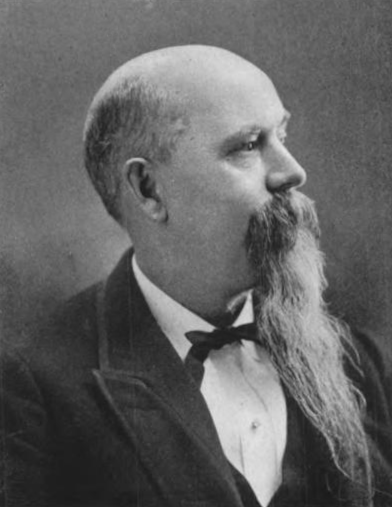
- Charles Henry Hackley, c. 1900
- Born: Charles Henry Hackley; January 3, 1837; Michigan City, Indiana
- Died: February 10, 1905 (aged 68); Muskegon, Michigan
- Occupation: Businessman
- Political party: Republican
- Spouse: Julia E. Moore (m. 1864)

Signature
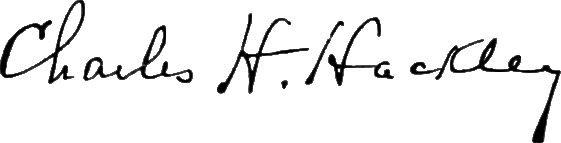

Charles Henry Hackley (January 3, 1837 – February 10, 1905) was an American timber businessman and philanthropist.

== Biography ==
The son of Joseph H. Hackley and Salina Fuller Hackley, Charles Hackley was born in Michigan City, Indiana, on January 3, 1837. With his father, he arrived in Muskegon, Michigan in 1856 from Indiana to work on the creation of the early Michigan roadways. Later he became the owner of many acres of cutting grounds throughout Michigan.

With business partner Thomas Hume, he opened the Hackley-Hume Lumber Mill on Muskegon Lake in 1854. He married Julia E. Moore in 1864.

After many successful years the mill of operation, the mill closed in 1894, after most of Michigan's Lower Peninsula had been effectively deforested. While many lumber mill owners moved their operations to the Pacific Northwest, Hackley remained in Muskegon and focused on urban revitalization of that city.

A Republican, he held several public offices, including Muskegon County treasurer, member of the common council, member of the Muskegon board of public works, and president of the school board.

He died from heart disease in Muskegon on February 10, 1905.

== Philanthropy ==
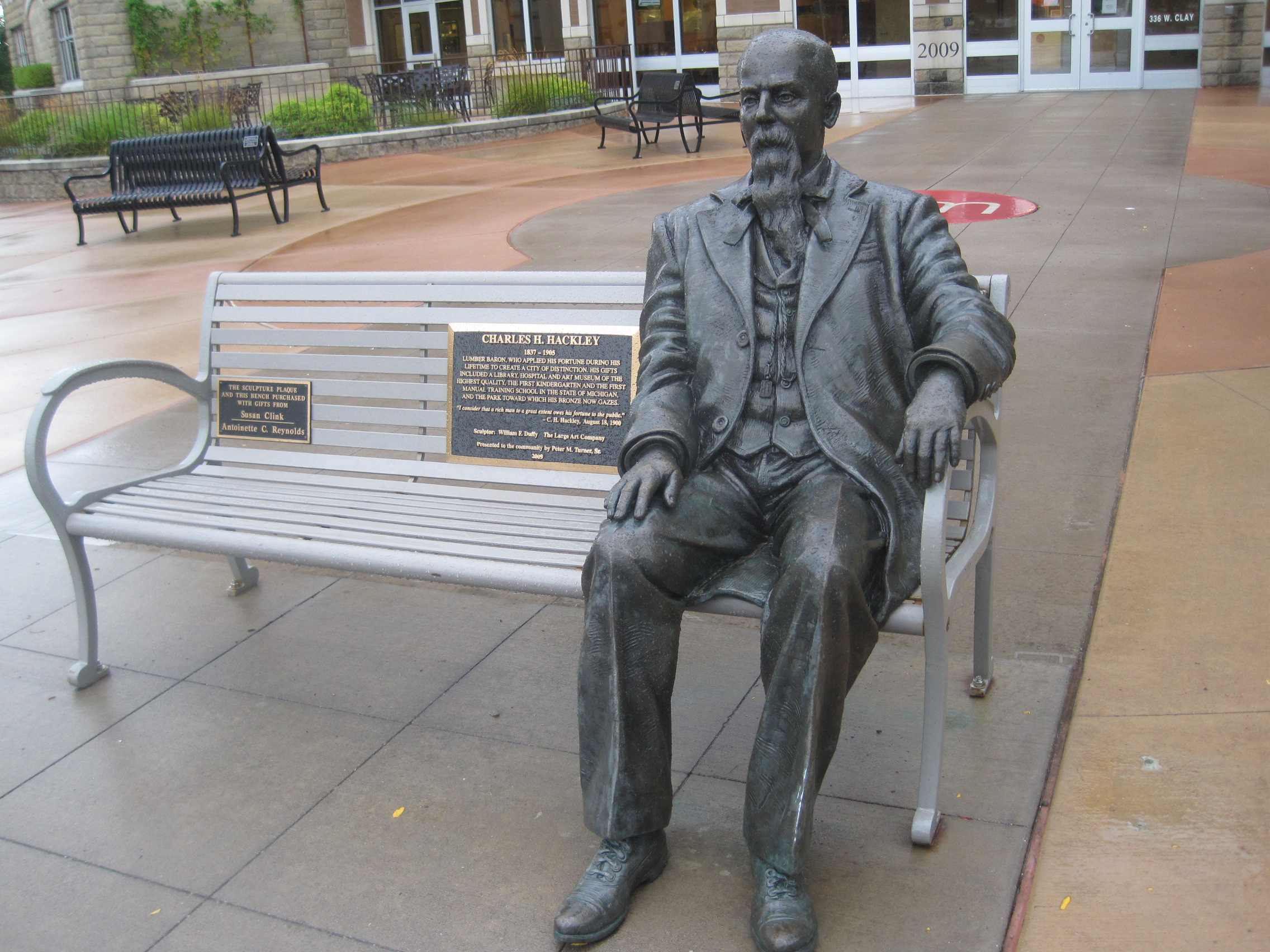
Statue of Charles Hackley in downtown Muskegon

Hackley became Muskegon's biggest philanthropist. In his own words: "A rich man to a great extent owes his fortune to the public. He makes money largely through the labor of his employees....Moreover, I believe that it should be expended during the lifetime of the donor, so that he can see that his benefactions do not miscarry and are according to his intent....To a certain extent, I agree with Mr. Carnegie....that it is a crime to die rich."

Hackley was much more than a philanthropist. He and his business partner, Thomas Hume, were strong supporters of the city of Muskegon. Armed with funding from the Muskegon Industrial fund, they were able to convince several companies to open shop in Muskegon (most notably, Brunswick, Central Paper Co (now Sappi Fine Paper) and Continental Motors (now L-3 Communications Inc.)). Growth of these companies would later provide thousands of jobs to Muskegonites for much of the twentieth century. Hackley is not only credited with his gifts to the city but also stopping the ebb of people leaving Muskegon for jobs elsewhere after the lumber industry folded.

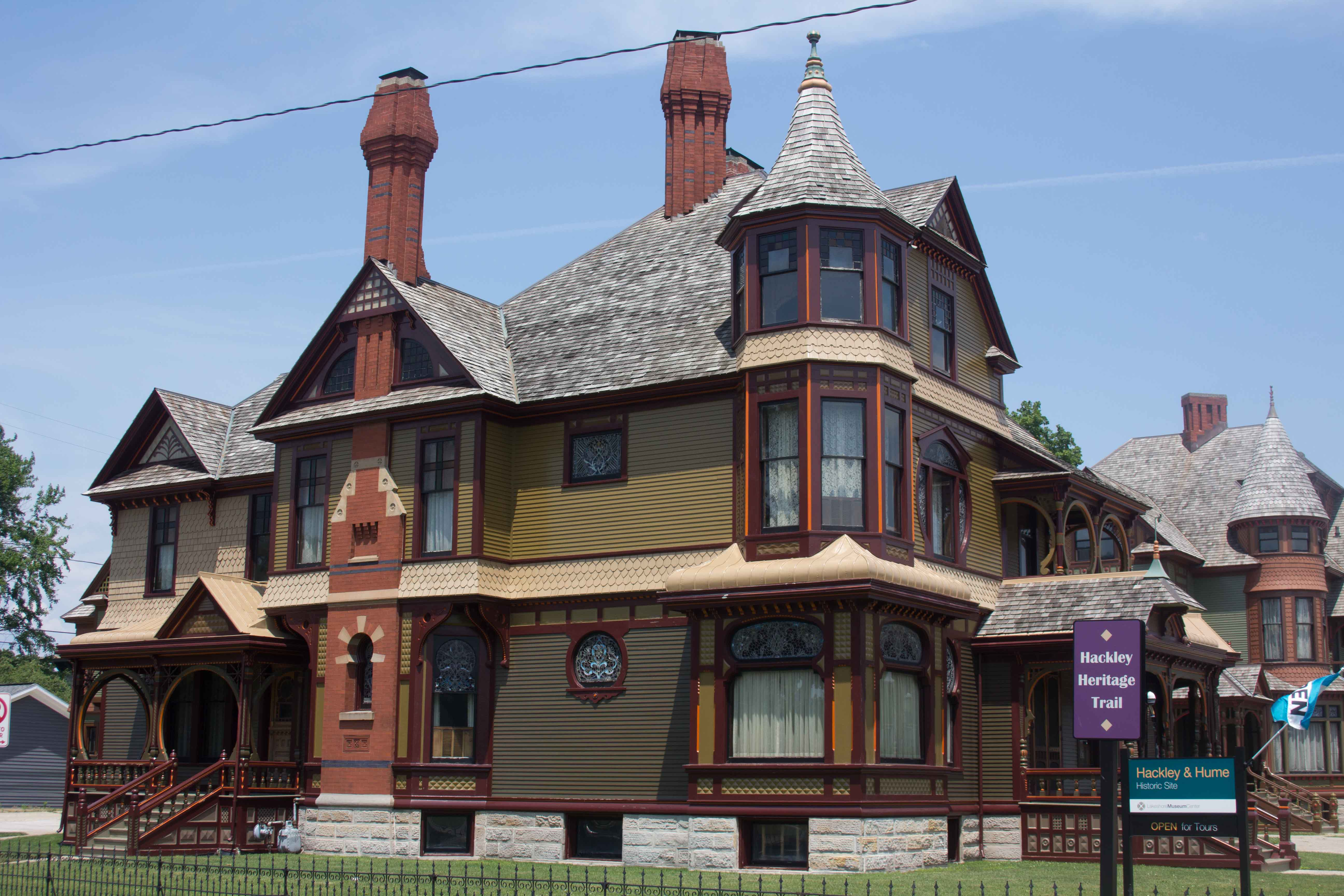
The Hackley house, a historic site

Both Hackley's and Hume's homes are still standing. After a major restoration in the mid-1990s, they are open for tour to community visitors. Also open for tour is The City Barn, which served as the pairs stable for horses and equipment. In addition, a replica of the building that housed the C. H. Hackley Hose Company No. 2 also serves as a museum. All are part of the Muskegon County Museum downtown.

Hackley also founded the neighboring city of Muskegon Heights.

His portrait was painted in 1904 by artist Herbert A. Collins. The painting was hung in the then newly completed Hackley Hospital.

== Legacy ==
Hackley was a lifelong philanthropist. Despite donating enormous sums of money in his lifetime, Hackley still managed a net worth of over $18,000,000 (roughly $600,000,000 in 2022). Hackley's gifts to the city of Muskegon alone were valued at $12.0 million in 1905 (nearly $400,000,000 in 2022 equivalent). They included:

- Hackley Public Library – site, building, contents, and an endowment
- Hackley Art Gallery – site, building, contents, and an acquisition fund (renamed Muskegon Museum of Art)
- Hackley Park – park, statues, and soldier's monument
- Hackley Manual Training School and Gymnasium – site, building, and equipment
- Hackley School, later home to Muskegon Community College, renamed Hackley Administration Building
- Hackley Athletic Field (renamed Hackley Stadium – seats 10,000 for Muskegon High School football games)
- Hackley Hospital – site, buildings, medical supplies and equipment, and an endowment
- City of Muskegon – Poor Fund Endowment
- Julia E. Hackley Educational Fund Endowment
- Muskegon Humane Union Endowment
- C. H. Hackley Hose Company No. 2
