= C. W. Marsh Company Building =

- U.S. National Register of Historic Places
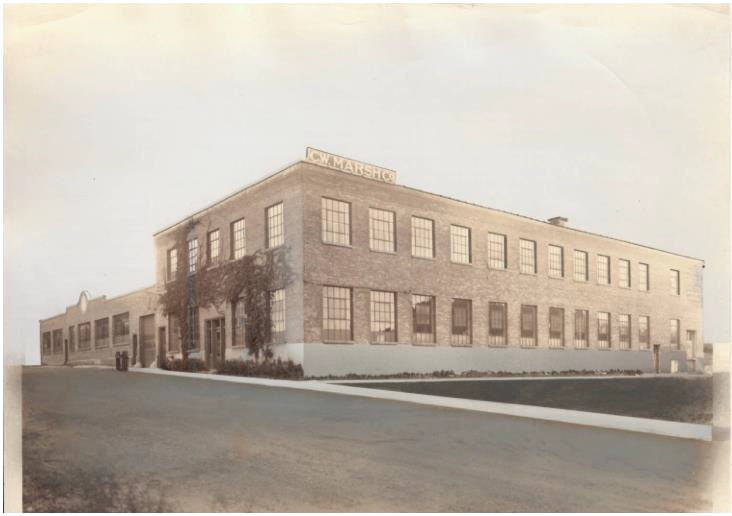
- CW March Co Building, 1928
- Interactive map
- Location: 1385 Hudson St., Muskegon, Michigan
- Coordinates: 43°13′40″N 86°16′01″W
- Built: 1907
- NRHP reference No.: 100012321
- Added to NRHP: November 17, 2025

The C. W. Marsh Company Building is a factory building located at 1385 Hudson Street in Muskegon, Michigan. It was listed on the National Register of Historic Places in 2025.

== History ==
Charles W. Marsh came to Muskegon from Chicago in 1900 as an employee of the Cutting-Kaestner Company, which produced leather novelties. The company failed a short time later, and March purchased its equipment. He began the manufacture of leather packings to seal mechanical devices. He worked a short time in rented rooms, then starting in about 1901 operated out of a warehouse on Western Avenue. The business grew quickly, and the warehouse space was soon inadequate. In 1907, March constructed a larger factory at 1385 Hudson Street and incorporated the business as Charles W. Marsh, Incorporated.

The business continued to grow, and an addition to the factory was constructed in 1928. The company continued to manufacture leather products through the Great Depression and into World War II, opening sales offices in multiple large industrial cities. Charles W. March died in 1941, passing the presidency of the company on to his son-in-law. The company remained family-owned until the present day.

== Description ==
The C. W. Marsh Company Building is a 25,000 square foot industrial building constructed in two phases. The original 1907 structure is a single story brick building. The 1928 addition is two stories with a basement. Both sections face Hudson Street and are built flush with the sidewalk. A parapet wall along the top includes a concrete medallion inscribed with the words "C. W. Marsh Co. Established 1900."
