= Navigation Structures at White Lake Harbor =

Navigation structures in Michigan, United States

- U.S. National Register of Historic Places
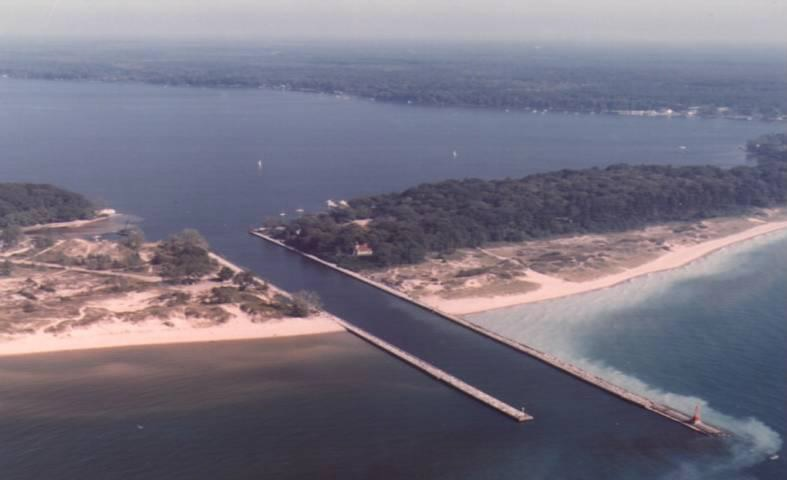

- Location within Michigan Location within the United States
- Interactive map
- Nearest city: Whitehall, Michigan
- Coordinates: 43°22′31″N 86°25′34″W
- Area: 5.1 acres (2.1 ha)
- Built: 1867
- Architectural style: Utilitarian
- NRHP reference No.: 00000535
- Added to NRHP: May 26, 2000

The Navigation Structures at White Lake Harbor are a set of piers protecting the channel connecting Lake Michigan and White Lake, located at the end of Lau Road near Whitehall, Michigan. It was listed on the National Register of Historic Places in 2000.

== History ==
A number of sawmills were established in the White Lake area between 1836 and 1850. Lumber from these mills was rafted through the narrow natural channel between White Lake and Lake Michigan before being loaded on ships. This was a time-consuming process, and the local lumbermen lobbied for an improved waterway. In 1866, an improvement program was funded by Congress. After surveying the area, the construction of a new harbor and channel was proposed. Work on this project commenced in 1867, and by late 1868 the channel was cut and revetments on both sides were in place. Piers extending out into Lake Michigan were gradually extended over the next five years. However, by 1873 it was determined that the original pier design was too short, creating a shoaling hazard, and both piers were extended.

In 1875 a lighthouse was constructed along the channel, and in 1887 a life saving station was added. In 1900-01 both piers were again extended, and in 1907 the entire channel and harbor dredged to a deeper depth. A few years later, shipping traffic through White Lake declined considerably, and the Army Corps of Engineers recommended the abandonment of the harbor. However, maintenance continued, with annual dredging, and, in 1936-37, the replacement of the superstructures of both piers with concrete. In 1946 the Life Saving Station was sold and subsequently moved, and in 1970 the lighthouse was sold and converted into a local museum.

== Description ==
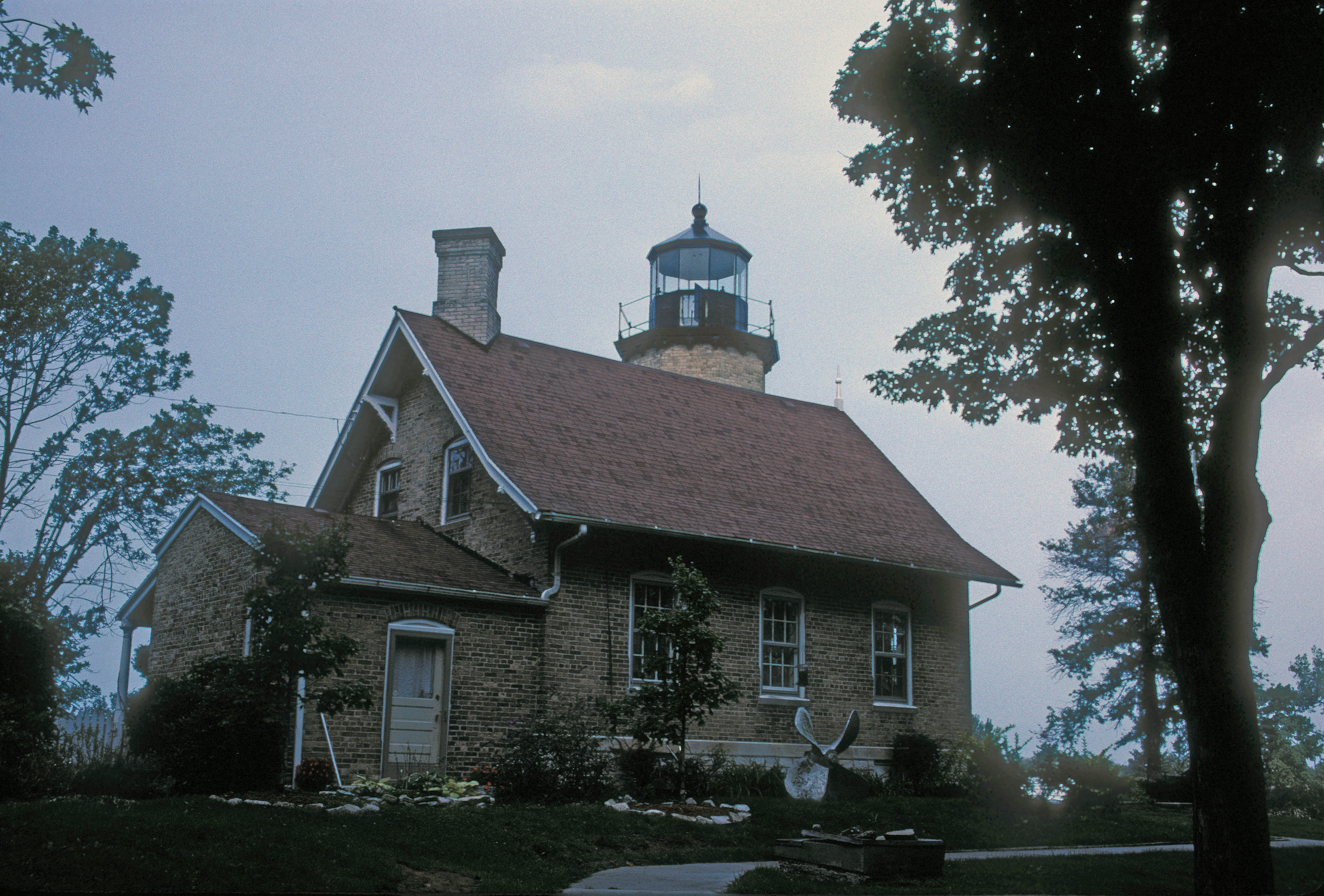
Lighthouse on south pier

White Lake Harbor is a man-made channel running through strip of land which separates White Lake from Lake Michigan. The associated navigation structures include three elements: the south pier, the north pier, and the revetments. The north and south piers are parallel to each other, and are 200 feet apart, The north pier is 1717 feet long and the south pier is 1953 feet long. The piers are constructed from a series of piles near the shore, and additional cribs at the end. The entire pier has a concrete superstructure. The revetments were originally of timber pile. A double row of sheet piling was added later, and concrete replaced the timber superstructure.
