= Hackley Park =

Park in Muskegon, Michigan

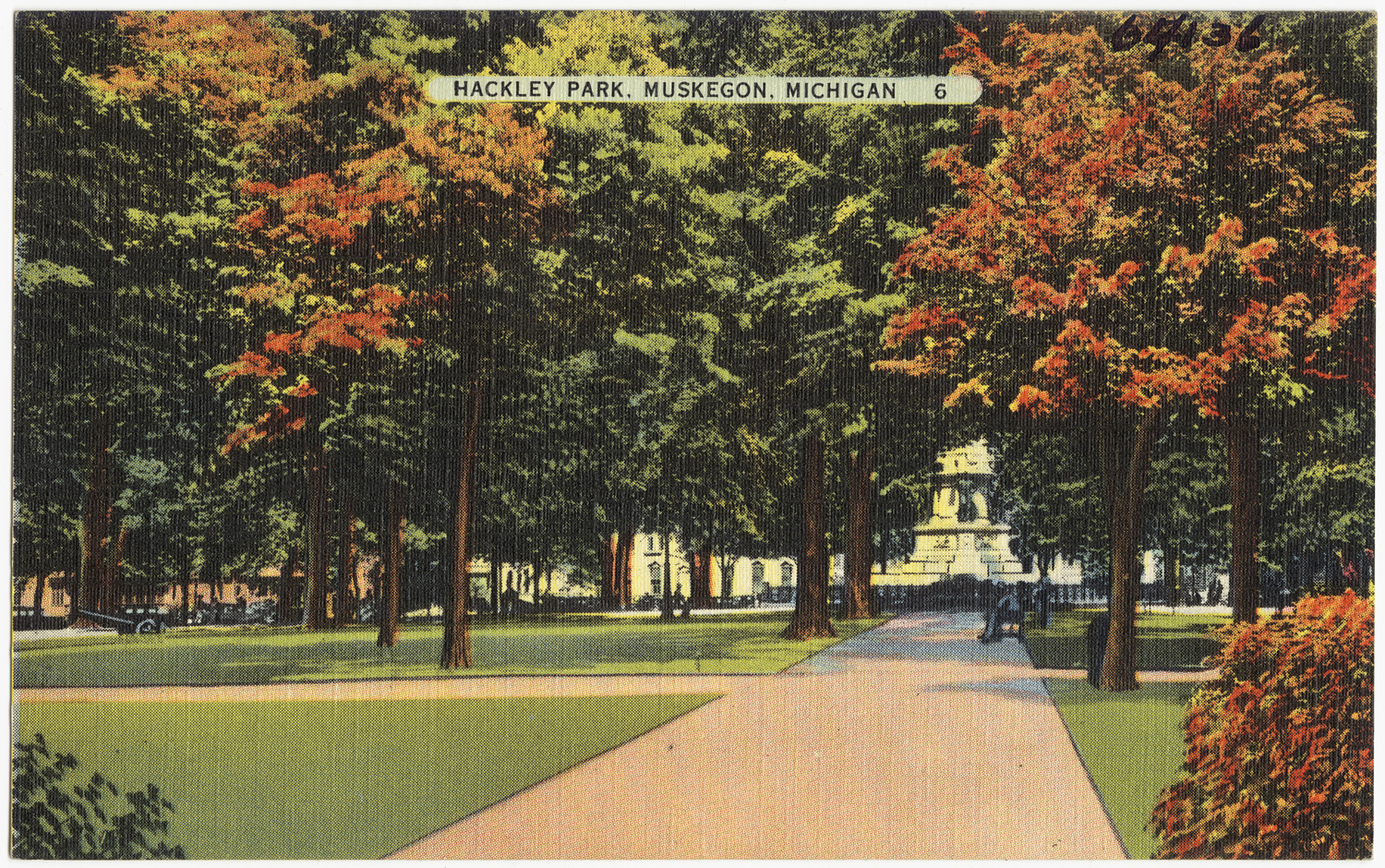
- Postcard of Hackley Park, Muskegon
- Interactive map of Hackley Park
- Location: Muskegon, Michigan
- Coordinates: 43.23389°N 86.2525°W
- Area: 2.3 acres (0.93 ha)
- Created: 1890
- Operator: City of Muskegon
- Status: Always open
- Website: www.muskegon-mi.gov/departments/parks/hackley-park
- Hackley Park
- U.S. Historic district – Contributing property
- Part of: Muskegon Historic District (ID72000647)
- Designated CP: September 27, 1972

Hackley Park is a municipal park in Muskegon, Michigan. In 1890, it was built on land donated by Charles H. Hackley to honor the memory of soldiers who fought in the Civil War. It is bounded by Clay & Webster, and Third & Fourth in the Muskegon Historic District near Muskegon Lake.

== Background ==
The 80 foot (24 m) Victory statue is the focal point of the park. Local businessman and philanthropist Charles H. Hackley donated the land to the city in 1890 as a memorial to veterans of the Civil War. Each corner of the park features Civil War heroes: David Farragut, William Tecumseh Sherman, Ulysses S. Grant and Abraham Lincoln.

There are three works by Charles Henry Niehaus in the park: a bust of Charles Hackley (1890), the Abraham Lincoln Monument (1900), and the David Farragut Monument (1900).
